= Rolandmühle =

Grain mill in Bremen, Germany

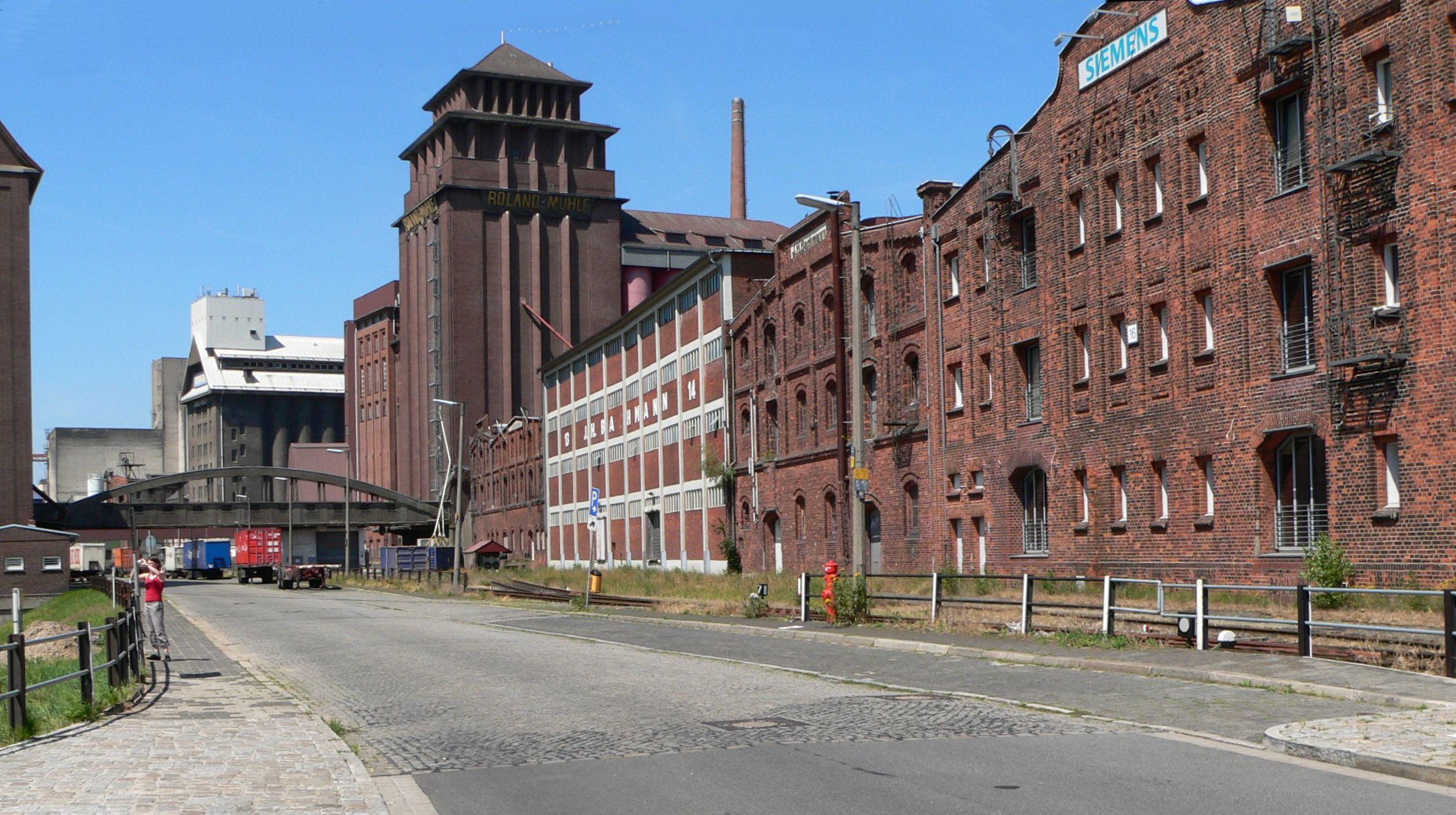
Rolandmühle

The Rolandmühle ("Roland Mill") in Bremen is an industrial grain mill that is one of the most important private production facilities in the harbour of Bremen. The company has about 100 employees and processes 350,000 tons of grain into flour annually for commercial and industrial use. Both imported and regionally grown grain are processed. The products have been supplied to both regional and export customers.

== History ==
In the course of the construction of the oil mill of Franz Köcheln at Stephanitorsbollwerk in Bremen during the 1810s, the master miller, who came from Groningen, brought along many assistants, among whom was the 30-year-old Berend Erling, who was singled out as "uncommon skilled". Erling remained in Bremen after the construction, established himself as a miller, and raised his own first windmill in 1832. The Am Wall Windmill (Herdentorswallmühle) stands today as the last windmill along the old Bremen city wall (Wallanlagen). It was followed in 1846 by the mill at Stephanitor (Stephanitorsmühle), whose upper part burned down in 1911. The bottom part served until 1930 as housing, and was demolished during the renovation of the platforms of the Weserbahnhof train station. Erling's son Johann took over the company and built the steam mill at Tannenstraße in Vegesack in 1882, which burned down in 1897.

After the first steam mill was destroyed, and with windmills no longer being economically profitable, Carl Erling founded in 1897 a stock company and built a brick building with a steam mill at the Bremen Holzhafen. It had a capacity of 100 tons per day. The wheat that it used was imported from around the world, and the flour that it produced was shipped by barge within Germany. For overseas export, seagoing ships were used.

In the following years the mill was enlarged and its capacity grew to about 800 tons per day. In 1925, the first silo tower was built to a plan by Carl Heinrich Behrens-Nicolai, and five years later it made its first acquisition of another mill. In 1940 a second silo was inaugurated that gave the Rolandmühle a storage capacity of 30,000 tons.

After acquiring competitors like the Grohner Mühlenwerke and the Hansamühle AG during the Great Depression, Hans Erling made the Bremer Rolandmühle AG a family-run company in 1937 with himself as the board director.

The demolition of the mill by explosion on the instigation of the Wehrmacht was interrupted in 1945 by the end of the Second World War.

At the beginning of the 1970s, a steel grain silo at the Rolandmühle broke open due to corrosion and emptied out its grain onto the street, without causing any injuries or further property damage.

== Flour-dust explosion ==
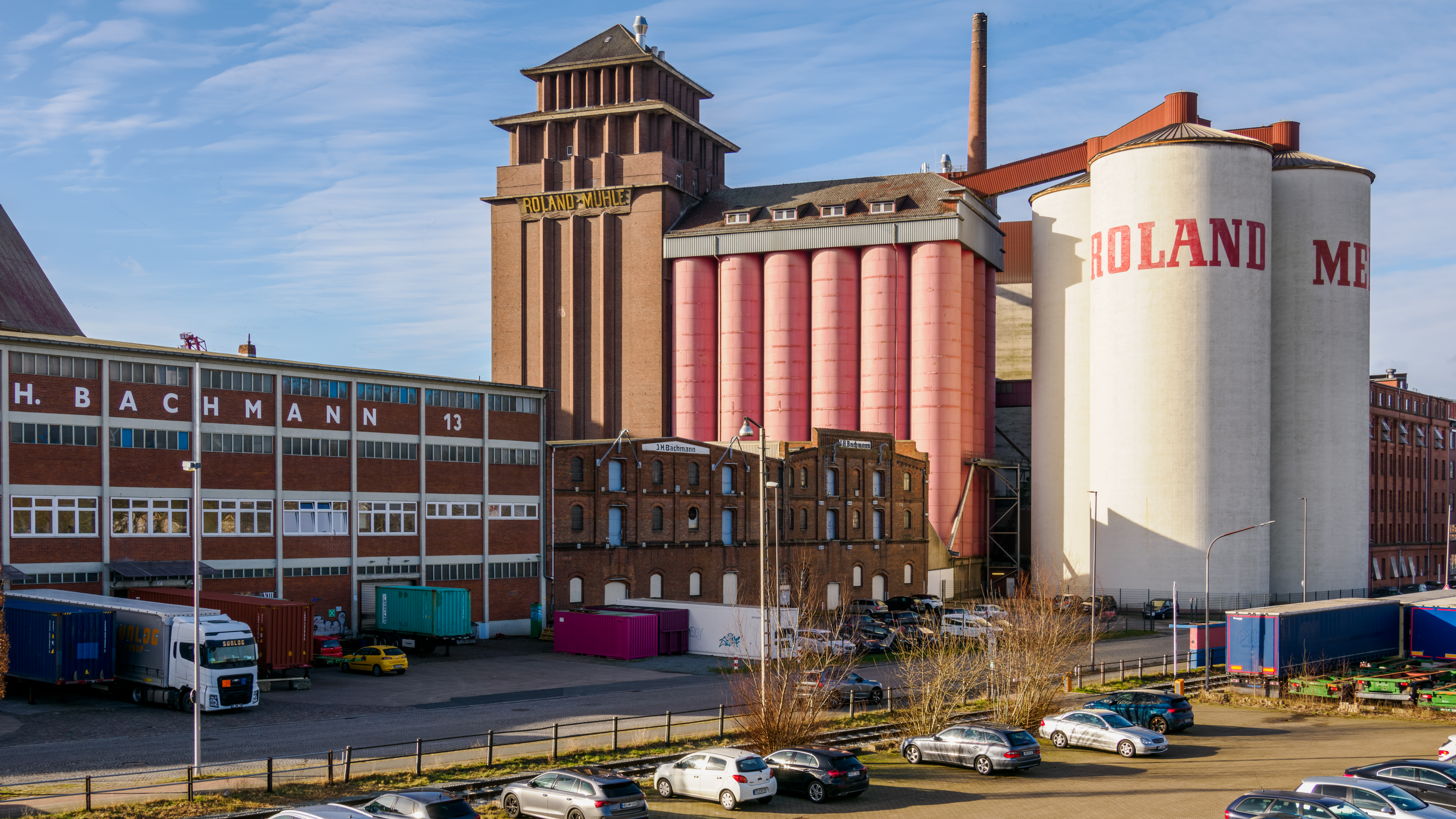
Silos of Roland-Mühle

The plant made headlines again on 6 February 1979 because of a fire. The cause was one of the largest peace-time explosions to date. A cable fire triggered the most powerful dust explosion in German history in a sample chamber on the quayside. From here, the fire spread across a conveyor bridge through further smaller dust explosions along this bridge, which filled the upper storage area with flour dust. In this room another small explosion triggered the catastrophe, that also set the flour silo on fire.

The roof of the silo was blown off by the pressure wave, the walls collapsed, and the whole building was torn apart. Windows were broken in houses even a large distance away from the mill, and flour dust rained down across an area of about 30 hectares. 14 people died in the detonation, and 17 were seriously injured. The fire burned until 12 March 1979. The incident caused damage to a cost of about 100 million Deutsche Mark (about 206 million Euro today). The Rolandmühle was afterwards completely rebuilt.

== The mill today ==
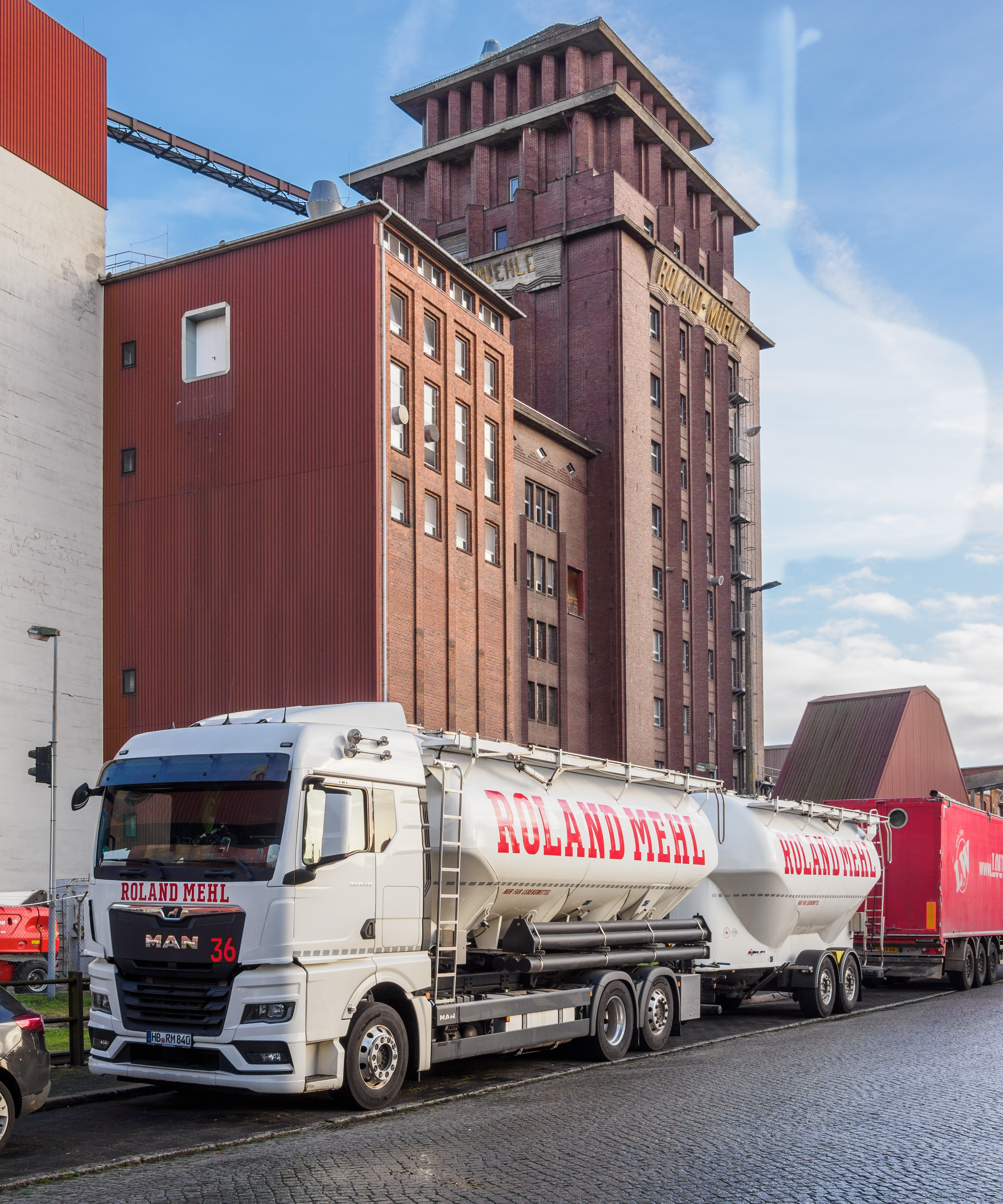
Silo truck at Roland-Mühle

The mill complex is equipped today with modern silos, totalling twelve small and three large silos.

The mill is an important component of the harbour economy in Bremen, and is a major employer in its district. The majority of its production is exported. About 360,000 tons of grain were processed annually (2014) by the mill. 100 to 200 vessels lie directly by the silos.

The company is currently led by Hans-Christoph Erling and Dieter Bohling.

In 2004, the company merged with two smaller enterprises. The three family-run companies, Bremer Rolandmühle Erling, Mills United Hovestadt & Münstermann, and Heyl-Mühlen grouped themselves under the name "Grain Millers" in 2004. Since 2013 the cooperative has used the name "Roland Mills United".
