= Johann Eberhard Schweling =

- Born: 1645
- Died: 1714 (aged 68–69)

Johann Eberhard Schweling (1645 – 1714) was a Cartesian philosopher from Bremen. He responded to Pierre Daniel Huet. Schweling probably commissioned the painting of Spinoza by Franz Wulfhagen.

His son was Heinrich Schweling.
