= Bombing of Bremen in World War II =

Bombing of Bremen
- Part of Strategic bombing during World War II
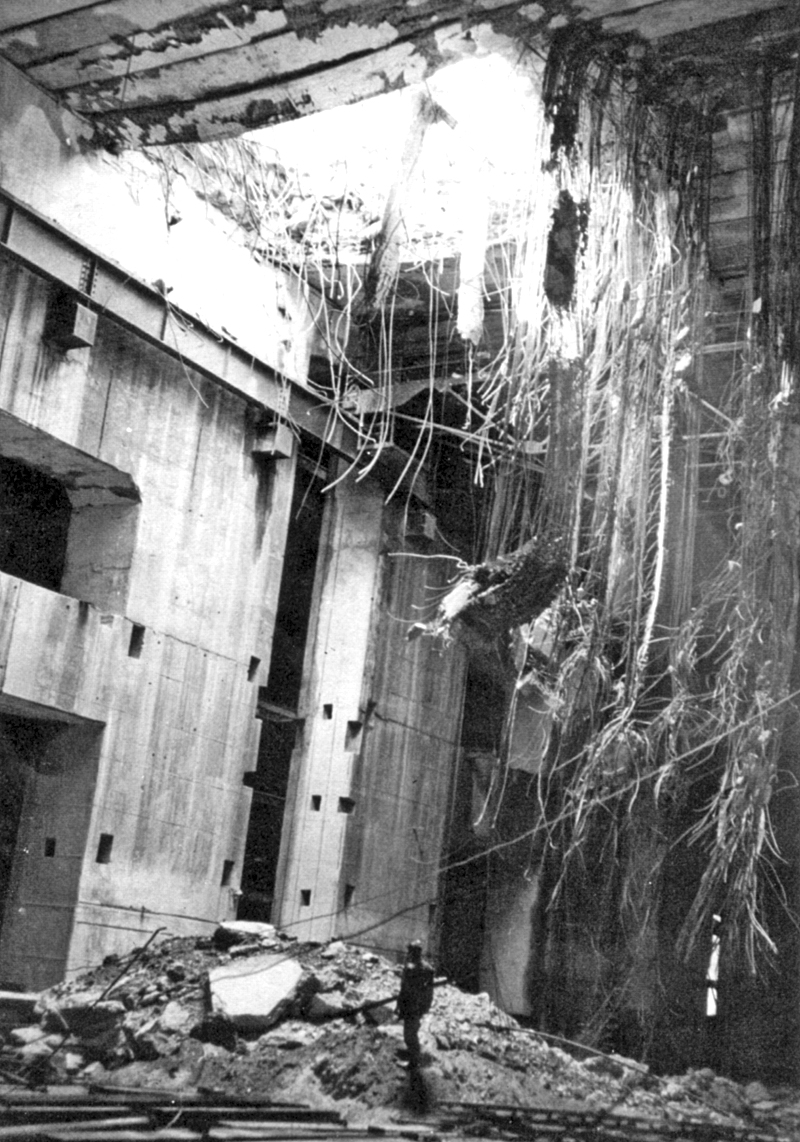
- U-bootbunker Valentin, a U-boat shelter built on the River Weser, after RAF bombing March 1945.
Location	Bremen

Belligerents
Western Allies (USAAF, RAF)	Germany

The Bombing of Bremen in World War II by the British Royal Air Force (RAF) and US Eighth Air Force involved both area bombing and, as capacity improved, more targeted raids upon the city's military-industrial facilities. These included the shipyards of Vulkan, AG Weser and Atlas Werke, the Valentin submarine pens, oil refineries and the aircraft works of Focke-Wulf.

Early RAF raids on Bremen beginning in May 1940 had sought out these industrial and military targets but the efforts proved costly and, given limited navigation and target-location capabilities, impractical.

From September 1941 the RAF switched to night-time "area bombing". In the spring of 1942 new directives from Bomber Command under Air Marshal Arthur Harris formalised the change of strategy. Drawing lessons from the German Blitz on Britain, Bomber Command concluded that rather than being "collateral damage", broader bombing raids which also destroyed residential districts served the legitimate purpose of weakening enemy morale.

To demonstrate the effectiveness of area bombing, Bomber Command sought to overwhelm city defences with "1,000 bomber" raids. The first of these mounted against Bremen was on 25 June 1942. Six hundred houses were destroyed but civil defence measures kept civilian casualties to 88. Flak and Luftwaffe fighters were able to shoot down 49 RAF bombers. Subsequent attacks were carried out by fewer but improved aircraft, and as Bremen's air-defence depleted (fighter aircraft were redeployed to the eastern front), these caused significantly more damage.

At the beginning of 1943, the daytime targeting of industrial and military facilities returned with the arrival over Bremen of the 8th US Air Force. In the first year, the "Mighty Eighth" suffered considerable losses. The German authorities began to evacuate industrial facilities from the city as a precaution.

On 8 October 1943, the British began a new wave of heavy night attacks. The heaviest air raid of the entire war hit the city on the night of August 18–19, 1944. In just 34 minutes 274 aircraft dropped 1,120 tons of bombs over the densely built-up west of the city killing 1,059 people, destroying 8,248 residential buildings, and leaving 50,000 homeless.

The last Allied air raid hit Bremen on April 22, 1945. Advancing behind a ground barrage, the British 3rd Infantry Division under General Lashmer Whistler entered the city in late April 1945.

In just over five years, the Allies carried out a total of 173 air raids on Bremen, dropping 5,513 tons of explosive devices, and killing more than 4,000 residents. In addition to the city center, almost 65,000 houses and apartments were destroyed, corresponding to around 62 percent of the city's residential accommodation. The west of Bremen with the districts of Walle and Gröpelingen was particularly hard hit.

The primary military formation tasked with the defense of Bremen's air space was the 8th Flak Division.

== Targets ==
- Atlas Werke shipbuilding company
- Bremen-Oslebshausen railway station
- Bremer Vulkan shipyard
- DeSchiMAG (AG Weser) shipyard
- Focke-Wulf aircraft factory
- Borgward motor transport plants
- Korff AG oil refinery
- Norddeutsche Hütte AG steel mill
- Valentin submarine pens, - protective shelters built for building U-boats

In June 1942, Bremen was the target for the RAF's third "thousand bomber raid".

== Timeline ==
Bombing of Bremen during World War II
Date	Air force	Notes
17-18 May 1940	RAF	24 Armstrong Whitworth Whitley bombers attacked Bremen oil installations.
21-22 December 1940	RAF	No. 15 Squadron RAF used converted Vickers Wellingtons for the first time to bomb the dockyards at Bremen
1-2, 2–3, 3–4 January 1941	RAF	141 aircraft bombed the aircraft factory in the south of the city. Smaller Bremen attacks are made on the following two nights.
12-13 March 1941	RAF	Heavy bombing raids were conducted on Hamburg, Bremen and Berlin
4 July 1941	RAF	12 Bristol Blenheim bombed an aircraft factory and a minesweeper.
17-18 January 1942	RAF	8 of 83 dispatched aircraft bombed the primary target at Bremen. Some of the aircraft attacking alternative targets reached Hamburg, which reports 11 fires and casualties of 5 dead and 12 injured. 3 Wellingtons were lost and one Short Stirling crashed England after being fired at and damaged by a British convoy.
21-22 January 1942	RAF	During the Bremen raid, Wing Commander Ken Wallis experimented with marker flares later used by Pathfinder Forces (PFF).
8-9 April 1942	RAF	Following a Hamburg raid, Bremen reports a load of incendiaries dropped very accurately on the Bremer Vulkan shipyard where 4 U-boats and several surrounding buildings were damaged by fire.
3-4 June 1942	RAF	170 aircraft attacked on the first large raid to Bremen since October 1941. 11 aircraft - 4 Wellingtons, 2 Handley Page Halifaxes, 2 Avro Lancasters, 2 Stirlings, 1 Avro Manchester - lost. Bremen recorded this as a heavy attack, the results of which exceeded all previous raids. Housing areas were heavily hit with 6 streets affected by serious fires. Damage to the U-boat construction yards (Valentin submarine pens) and the Focke-Wulf factory is described as 'of no importance' but there were hits in the harbour area which damaged a pier, some warehouses and the destroyer Z25. 83 people dead, 29 seriously and 229 slightly injured (Bremen's third heaviest casualty toll in the war).
25-26 June 1942 (Operation Millennium II)	RAF	Using every available aircraft in RAF Bomber Command and some of other commands, a thousand-bomber raid was mounted against Bremen. 1,067 aircraft (472 Wellingtons, 124 Halifaxes, 96 Lancasters, 69 Stirlings, 51 Blenheims, 50 Handley Page Hampdens, 50 Whitleys, 24 Douglas Bostons, 20 Manchesters and de Havilland Mosquitos), 102 Lockheed Hudsons and Wellingtons of RAF Coastal Command, and 5 RAF Army Cooperation Command. Those of No. 5 Group RAF - 142 aircraft – bombed the Focke-Wulf factory; 20 Blenheims were allocated to the AG Weser shipyard; the RAF Coastal Command aircraft were to bomb the DeSchiMAG shipyard; all other aircraft were to carry out an area attack on the "town and docks". The limited success was entirely due to the use of GEE, which enabled the leading crews to start marker fires through the cloud cover. 696 Bomber Command aircraft were able to claim attacks on Bremen. 572 houses were completely destroyed and 6,108 damaged. 85 people were killed, 497 injured and 2,378 bombed out. At the Focke-Wulf factory, an assembly shop was completely flattened, 6 buildings were seriously damaged and 11 buildings lightly so. The Atlas Werke, the Bremer Vulkan shipyard, the Norddeutsche Hütte, the Korff refinery, and two large dockside warehouses were also damaged. 48 Bomber Command aircraft were lost (a new record 5% of those dispatched), including 4 which came down in the sea near England from which all but 2 crew members were rescued. This time, the heaviest casualties were suffered by the OTUs of No. 91 Group RAF, which lost 23 of the 198 Whitleys and Wellingtons provided by that group, a loss of 11.6 per cent. 5 of the 102 Coastal Command aircraft were also lost.
29-30 June 1942	RAF	144 aircraft - 55 Wellingtons, 39 Halifaxes, 26 Stirlings, 24 Lancasters. 9 aircraft - 4 Wellingtons, 2 Halifaxes, 2 Lancasters, 1 Stirling - lost. 119 aircraft bombed blindly through cloud after obtaining GEE fixes. Bremen records that two of the large firms hit in the recent Thousand raid - the Atlas Werke and the Korff refinery - were damaged again, as well as several smaller firms and dockside warehouses. A hospital and an unrecorded number of houses were also hit. Seven people were killed and eighty injured.
19 November 1942		Bremen was added to the USAAF target list.
17 April 1943	VIII	Mission Number 52: 115 B-17s were dispatched on the Eighth Air Force's largest mission to that date. 63-15-17 Luftwaffe aircraft claimed; 15 B-17s downed by fighters, 1 by flak, 39 damaged; 2 killed in action, 4 wounded in action and 159 missing in action. Bombs destroyed at least half of the Focke-Wulf factory buildings. German losses in combat were three fighters from (two from JG 1 and one from JG 11).
8 October 1943	VIII	The 381st Bombardment Group was awarded a Distinguished Unit Citation for its performance for bombing the Bremen shipyards accurately in spite of persistent Luftwaffe fighter attacks and extremely heavy and accurate flak. One B-17 had two bombs that failed to release and received a flak hit which caused them to explode (8 KIA, 2 POW). 30 bombers were lost.
13 November 1943	VIII	Mission 130: 79 of 159 B-17's, 61 of 109 B-24's and 3 of 4 B-17 PFF aircraft hit the port area at Bremen and targets of opportunity in the Kiel-Flensburg area at 1120–1145 hours; 100+ aircraft abort the mission due to weather; they claim 20-14-13 Luftwaffe aircraft; 3 B-17s and 13 B-24s are lost; 3 B-17s a
26 November 1943	VIII	Mission 138: 350 of 390 B-17s, 77 of 101 B-24s and 13 of 14 B-17 PFF aircraft attack the port area of Bremen at 1145–1228 hours; they claim 16-3-10 Luftwaffe aircraft; 22 B-17s and 3 B-24s are lost; 3 B-17s and 1 B-24 are damaged beyond repair and 139 B-17s, 19 B-24s and 7 PFF B-17s are damaged; casualties are 10 KIA, 35 WIA and 215 MIA.
29 November 1943	VIII	Mission 140: 154 of 360 B-17's hit the port of Bremen and targets of opportunity in the area at 1429–1450 hours; unfavorable cloud conditions and malfunction of blindbombing equipment cause 200+ B-17's to abort; they claim 15-11-10 Luftwaffe aircraft; 13 B-17's are lost, 3 damaged beyond repair and 43 damaged; casualties are 2 KIA, 13 WIA and 131 MIA. The B-17's are escorted by 38 P-38's and 314 P-47's; they claim 15-4-6 Luftwaffe aircraft; 7 P-38's and 9 P-47's are lost; 1 P-47 is damage beyond repair and another damaged; casualties are 1 WIA and 16 MIA.
18 June 1944	VIII	Mission 421: 18 B-17 Flying Fortresses hit Bremen-Oslebshausen railway station; 107 Consolidated B-24 Liberators bomb Bremerhaven
24 June 1944	VIII	Mission 438: Of 340 B-17s, 213 hit oil industry targets in Bremen, 53 hit an aircraft factory at Wesermünde and 40 attack Bremen; 1 B-17 is lost and 105 damaged; 2 airmen are WIA and 9 MIA. Escort is provided by 6 fighter groups (185 P-38s and 85 P-47s); 1 group strafes an airfield and rail transport in the Munster and Hamm areas and claims 2-0-0 Luftwaffe aircraft on the ground; no losses.
29-30 June 1944	RAF	253 aircraft - 108 Wellingtons, 64 Lancasters, 47 Stirlings, 34 Halifaxes - dispatched, the first time that 4-engined bombers provided more than half of the force on a major raid. 11 aircraft - 4 Stirlings, 4 Wellingtons, 3 Halifaxes - were lost. Bremen reported that 48 houses were destroyed and 934 damaged, mostly lightly. Extensive damage occurred in 5 important war industries, including the Focke-Wulf factory and the AG Weser U-boat construction yard, and at the local gasworks, a museum and a merchant-navy college, mostly fire.
29 July 1944	RAF	During Mission 503 to the Bremen/Oslebshausen oil refinery, Torpedo boat T2 (type 35) was bombed and sunk at Bremen
16 September 1944	VIII	As part of Mission 635, P-47s and 149 P-51s bomb and strafe the Bremen area.
18-19 September 1944	RAF	Of a force of 213 dispatched, 208 Lancasters of No. 5 Group and a number of Mosquitoes dropped 863 tons of bombs, including 420,000 4lb incendiaries, on Bremerhaven, destroying 297 acres of the port's total built up acreage of 375. One Lancaster and one Mosquito were lost.
26 September 1944	VIII	As part of Mission 648, 381 B-17s bomb the armoured vehicle factories at Bremen, another 13 bombed Bremerhaven and one hit another target. Of the 420 B-17 sent on the mission four B-17s were lost and 208 damaged. 10 airmen were wounded and a further were 21 were reported as missing in action. The escort was provided by 133 P-51s, one was lost with the pilot reported missing in action and two were damaged beyond repair. Schichau Seebeckwerft Unterseeboot 3509 was damaged during a Bremerhaven bombing raid.
12 October 1944	VIII	Mission 674: 262 Eighth Air Force B-17s bomb Borgward and Goliath plants producing armored fighting vehicles and the Focke-Wulf Fw 190 components plant. 267 bombing visually; 1 other hits a target of opportunity; 1 B-17 is lost, 1 damaged beyond repair and 59 damaged. 7 airmen are KIA, 1 WIA and 9 MIA. Escort is provided by 273 P-47s and P-51s; they claim 17-2-1 aircraft; 5 P-51s are lost (pilots MIA).
24 February 1945	VIII	As part of Mission 845, 200 B-17s were sent to bomb the Deschimag U-boat yards at Bremen and another 134 to bomb the Bremen W rail bridge. Of the total of 383 sent on the mission one B-17 was lost, one damaged beyond repair and a further 162 damaged; seven airmen were wounded and nine were reported missing in action. The bombers were escorted by 93 P-51s. The fighters claim they destroyed one and damaged three German aircraft on the ground, for the loss of two P-51s with their pilots missing in action.
11 March 1945	VIII	As part of Mission 881, 406 of 413 B-17s bombed the Deschimag U-boat yard at Bremen. Nine B-17s were damaged, and one of the 255 P-51 escorting fighters was lost.
27 March 1945	RAF	115 Lancasters of No. 5 Group RAF attacked an oil-storage depot (95 aircraft) and a U-boat shelter (20 aircraft of No. 617 Squadron RAF) at Farge. Two Grand Slam bombs penetrated two metres and detonated, which rendered the shelter unusable. No aircraft were lost.
30 March 1945	VIII	303rd BG (H) Combat Mission No. 348: 38 aircraft were dispatched to bomb Bremen. The submarine building yards were the first priority target
