= Ports of Bremen =

Ports and harbours in Bremen and Bremerhaven, Germany

Coordinates: 53°34′12″N 8°32′38″E

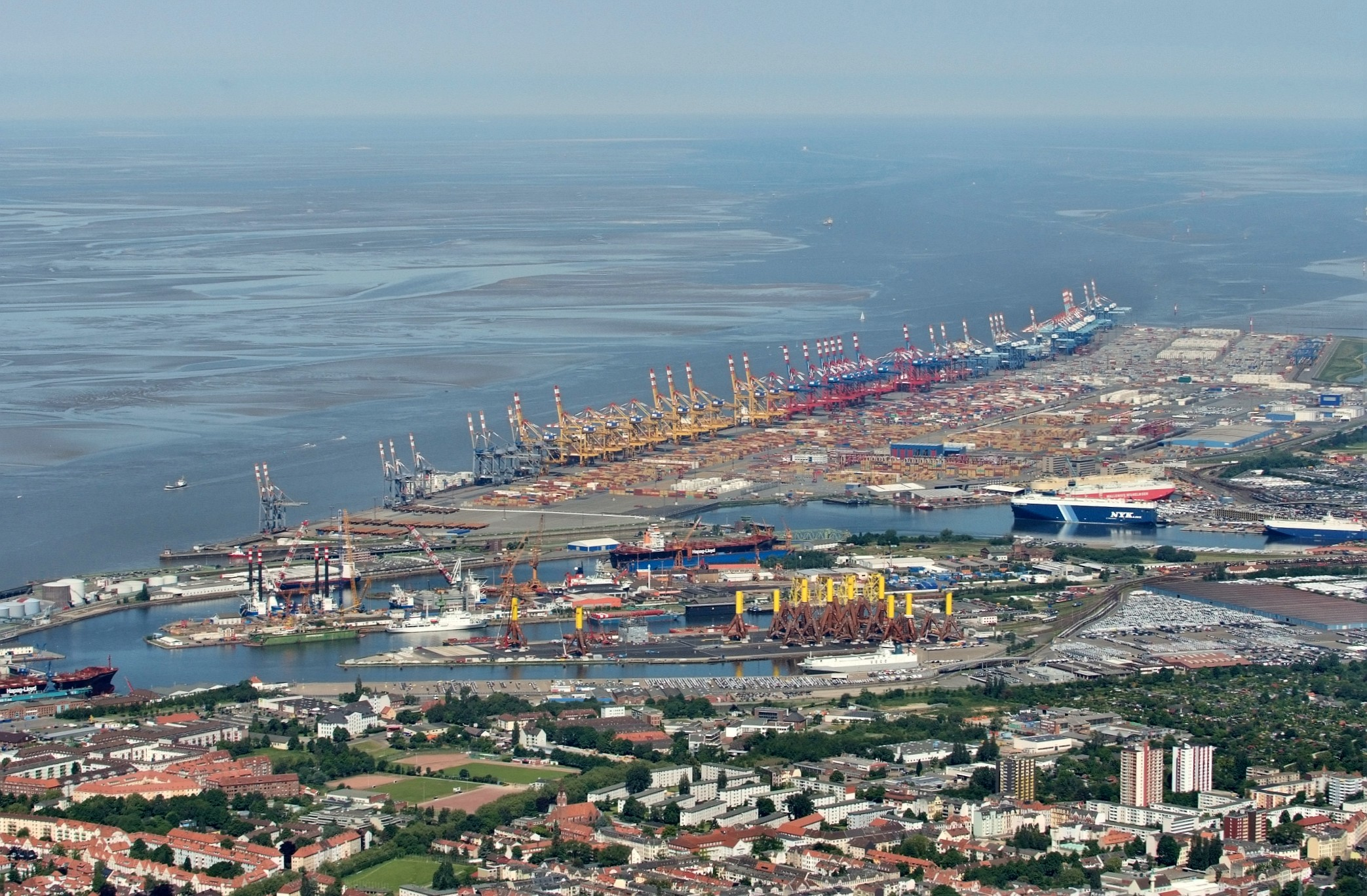
Bremerhaven container terminal of Bremen Ports, 2012

The Ports of Bremen, Bremen Ports or Bremish Ports, (in German "Bremische Häfen") consist of the ports of the German state Free Hanseatic City of Bremen, located in Bremen and Bremerhaven. The ports are managed by bremenports GmbH & Co. KG, a company of private status in public property.

In 2025, in the Ports of Bremen more than 65,3 million tons of goods were transported, including 4,9 million TEU (container) and 2 million cars. Bremerhaven Harbour is the world's busiest port transporting cars.

== History ==
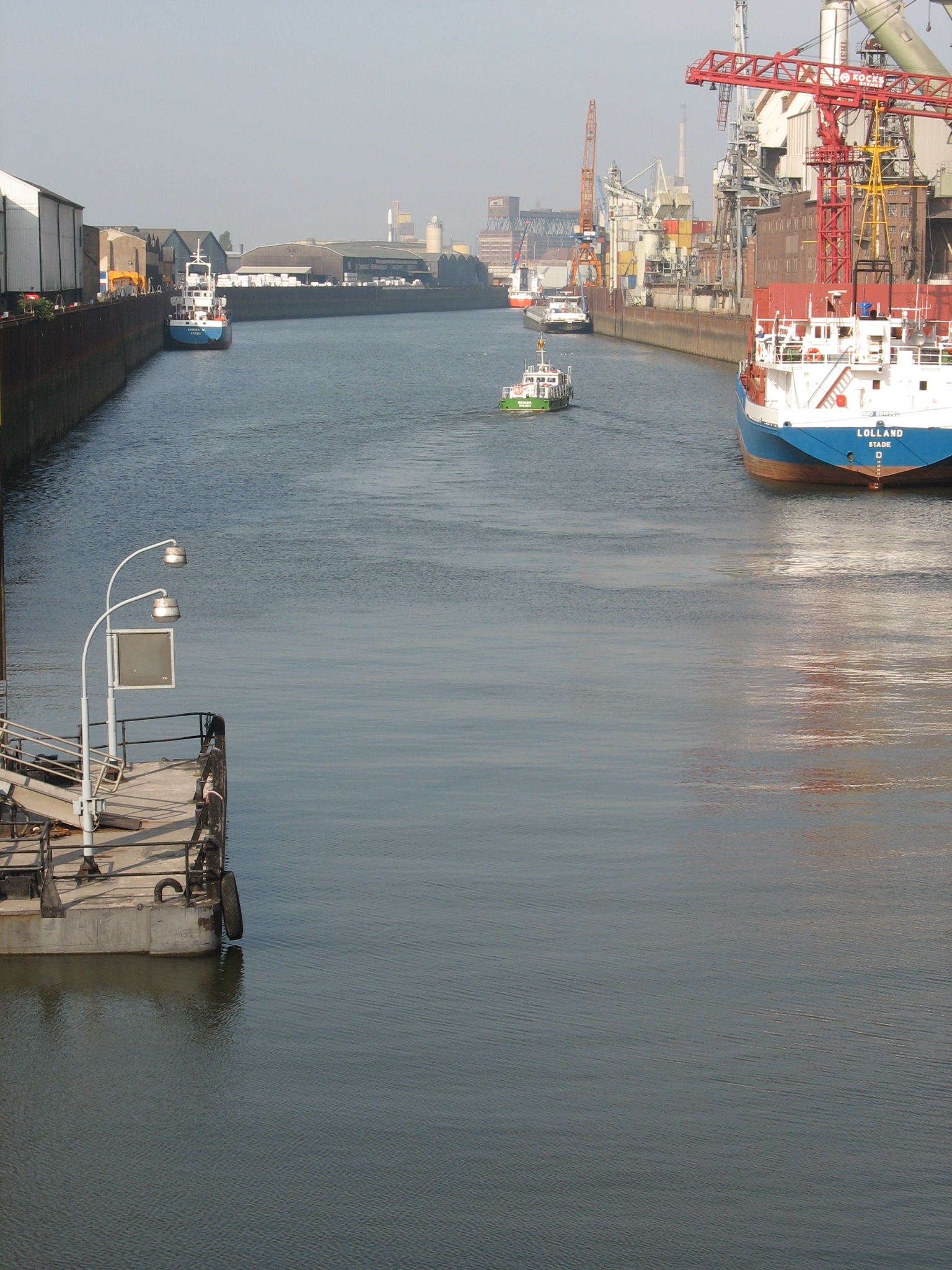
Holz- und Fabrikenhafen ("Wood & Factories Harbour")

=== Medieval harbours ===
The first port of Bremen was the Balge, a narrow branch of the Weser river. In the mid-13th century, on Bremen city's riverside of the main river, a quay was built, called the Schlachte. For about three centuries, both ports were used in parallel, before Balge harbour stopped being used.

=== Outer Harbours ===
Like in many other European regions, the medieval extension of agriculture increased erosion of soil in the Weser basin. Since about 1400, the bed of the lower Weser was choked with sand, dramatically. Laden sea vessels could no longer run upriver to Bremen city. Ships were discharged on riverboats in the open lower Weser. In 1622/23, Bremen's first outer harbour was founded in Vegesack, 20 km downstream of Bremen. Soon it was lacking depth, too.

Finding a more durable outer harbour site was difficult, as the neighbouring territorial states preferred to patronize their own ports. Finally in 1827, the state of Bremen succeeded to buy the ground of the relics of Swedish foundation Carlsburg on the mouth of the Geeste river into the Weser estuary. In 1830 the first port of Bremerhaven was opened.

=== Emigrants of 19th century ===
In 1832, Bremen passed a law for human standards for emigrant passengers in overseas traffic. For some decades the ports of Bremen became the most important emigrant harbour of central Europe.

=== Weser Correction and modern basins of the 19th century ===
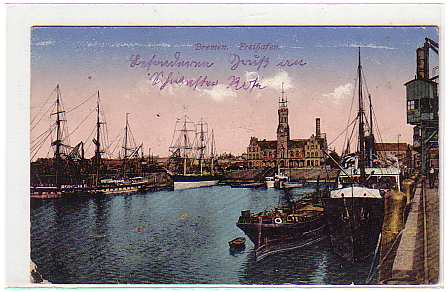
Bremen free port in 1918

After Bremen in 1847 was linked to the Royal Hanoverian State Railways, the Bremish state built its own short railway line from the (Hanoverian) station to the bank of the river Weser near the edge of the old city. The goods station on the new quay, called Weserbahnhof, was one of the most modern links between land transport and sea trade of that age.

In the last quarter of the 19th century, a way was found to employ the help of natural powers to use the lower Weser as an efficient waterway for modern sea vessels. Ludwig Franzius, building superintendent of Bremen, recorded the hydrology of the lower Weser for several years. In 1881, he published a convincing project. In 1887 to 1895, works were done under his management. In the meantime, in Bremen city some modern basins were built. When in 1888 the state of Bremen joined the German Customs Union, the Europahafen became a free port that was later enlarged by other new basins.

=== World War II ===
During the Second World War, the ports of Bremen and Bremerhaven transformed from civilian trading hubs into heavily militarized armaments centers and theaters of war. Civilian port operations were largely suspended, while work at the armaments shipyards within the port areas intensified significantly. Naval ship and submarine construction was a major economic sector for the large shipyards, with shipbuilding forming the core of the regional armaments industry. The major shipyards, AG Weser and Bremer Vulkan, came under complete state control by the Nazis and were converted to production for the Kriegsmarine.

AG Weser, located in the Gröpelingen district of Bremen, rose to become one of the world's most important submarine manufacturers. It primarily produced the Type IX standard submarine and, from 1943 onwards, the modern Type XXI "wonder weapon" submarine. In total, the shipyard completed over 160 submarines. Bremer Vulkan in Vegesack engaged in the rapid, high-volume production of submarines (particularly the Type VII C) and destroyers. The Schichau Seebeckwerft & Joh. C. Tecklenborg company in Bremerhaven built smaller warships and minesweepers, in addition to manufacturing submarine components.

As most workers were fighting in Hitler’s war from 1939 onwards, Bremen’s port and armaments industries ground to a halt by 1941. Consequently, the Nazis established a system based on forced labor, the exploitation of prisoners of war, and concentration camp imprisonment to keep theharbor and war industry running. More than 100 concentration camps existed in Bremen and Bremerhaven.

The most brutal symbol of this era is the Valentin submarine pens in Bremen-Farge with a direct underground connection to river Weser. The Nazis intended to use this bomb-proof bunker for the assembly-line production of Type XXI submarines. Between 1943 and 1945, over 10,000 forced laborers, prisoners of war, and inmates from the Neuengamme concentration camp network toiled at Bunker Valentin under inhumane conditions; an estimated 2,000-plus people died at the construction site from exhaustion, malnutrition, or targeted killings. Due to the advancing Allied forces and heavy bomb damage, the bunker was never fully completed and never became operational.

Both the port of Bremerhaven and the ports belonging to the city of Bremen were major strategic targets for Allied air raids beginning in 1940.

As Bremen was home to key centers of the armaments industry and the construction of submarines and warships (such as the AG Weser and Bremer Vulkan shipyards), as well as serving as a logistical hub, it was subjected to massive bombing.

On May 7, 1945, British forces entered Bremerhaven and it`s ports, which was then handed over to the U.S. 29th Infantry Division on May 20. 1945. Bremen and Bremerhaven became part of the American occupation zone as an enclave.

=== After WW2 ===
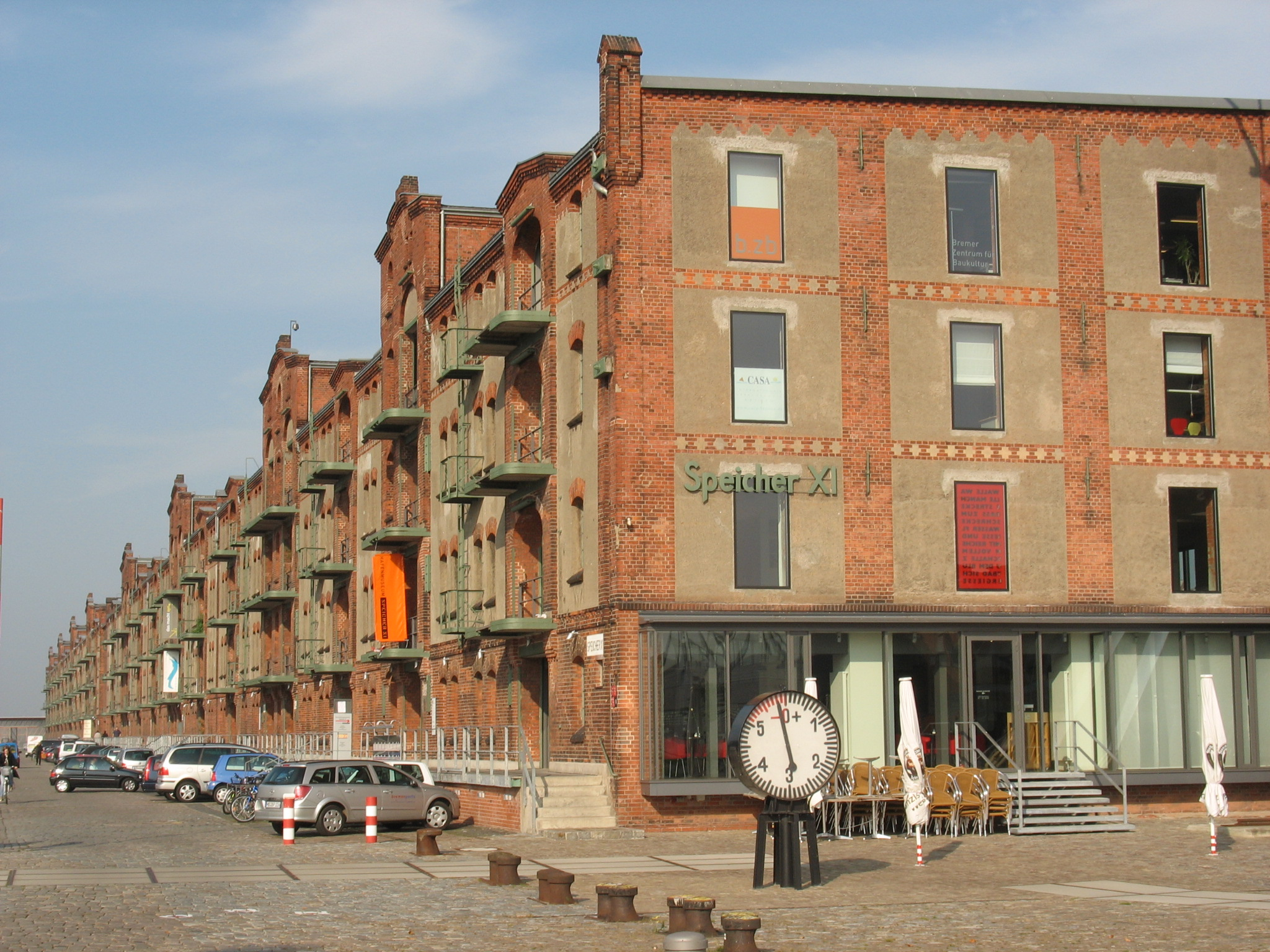
Converted warehouses in Überseestadt

After World War II in 1945 the US Army established in Bremerhaven a US Army Port of Embarkation to supply the troops in Germany.

The ports of Bremen have seen the same developments as most other ports of the world and overseas passenger traffic has switched to air transport. Container transport is the also in Bremerhaven the mayjor business.

In 1964, Bremen's first container port was opened, the Neustädter Hafen in Bremen. Since the 1970s, a line of container terminals were built north of the older ports of Bremerhaven, on the bank of the Weser estuary on the edge of the open sea.

Starting in the 1970s, traditional industries faced a simultaneous, massive crisis. Cheap international competition caused the collapse of almost all of Bremen’s large, long-established shipyards, like AG Weser and Bremer Vulkan. In addition, the introduction of international catch quotas and the expansion of exclusive economic zones led to a contraction of the German deep-sea fishing industry. A development that particularly affected Bremerhaven.

In 1993, US armed forces withdrew from Bremerhaven. With their departure, the city lost not only around 4,000 soldiers and their families but also significant purchasing power and a part of its post-war identity.

To counter this decline, Bremerhaven initiated a profound structural transformation: The establishment of world-class institutions such as the Alfred Wegener Institute for Polar and Marine Research (AWI) and the expansion of the local university of applied sciences turned Bremerhaven into a hub for cutting-edge European technology.

Alongside container and vehicle handling, the city established itself as a pioneer in offshore wind energy and innovative green hydrogen projects.

The Überseehafen in the city of Bremen which opened in 1906, was taken out of service in 1991. In 1998, the basin was filled up with soil excavated in the maintaining of the shipping lane of outer Weser estuary. This reclaimed land has provided space for a new urban district, called Überseestadt.

=== Military Deployment Hub Bremerhaven ===
Between 2026 and 2031, the port of Bremerhaven is to be upgraded for military use at a cost of over €1.35 billion.

In the event of a NATO deployment, Bremerhaven is intended to be utilized thanks to its access to the North Sea—specifically via the Überseehafen —as well as its existing infrastructure and connections to the hinterland. The plans include the construction of a new heavy-load bridge and several heavy-load areas within the port, a connecting canal with a swing bridge, and various inland quays in the Kaiserhafen. In addition, port basins are to be deepened, and road and rail connections expanded. Bremen Airport is also set to be upgraded to meet military requirements.

The State of Bremen and the Federal Ministry of Defence signed an agreement to this effect in September 2026.

== Bremenports ==
Bremenports (officially bremenports GmbH & Co. KG) is the public port management company responsible for the infrastructure of the twin ports of Bremen and Bremerhaven. Bremenports is responsibel for the port development, planning, constructing and maintaining maritime infrastructure such as locks, quays, and terminal railways and marketing the twin ports internationally. It is 100% publicly owned by the Free Hanseatic City of Bremen. It manages the ports under a mandate and public service contract on behalf of the state's Senator for Ports.

The cargo terminals directly are operated by private logistics companies.

== Terminals and sites ==
– except for marinas and regional passenger traffic –

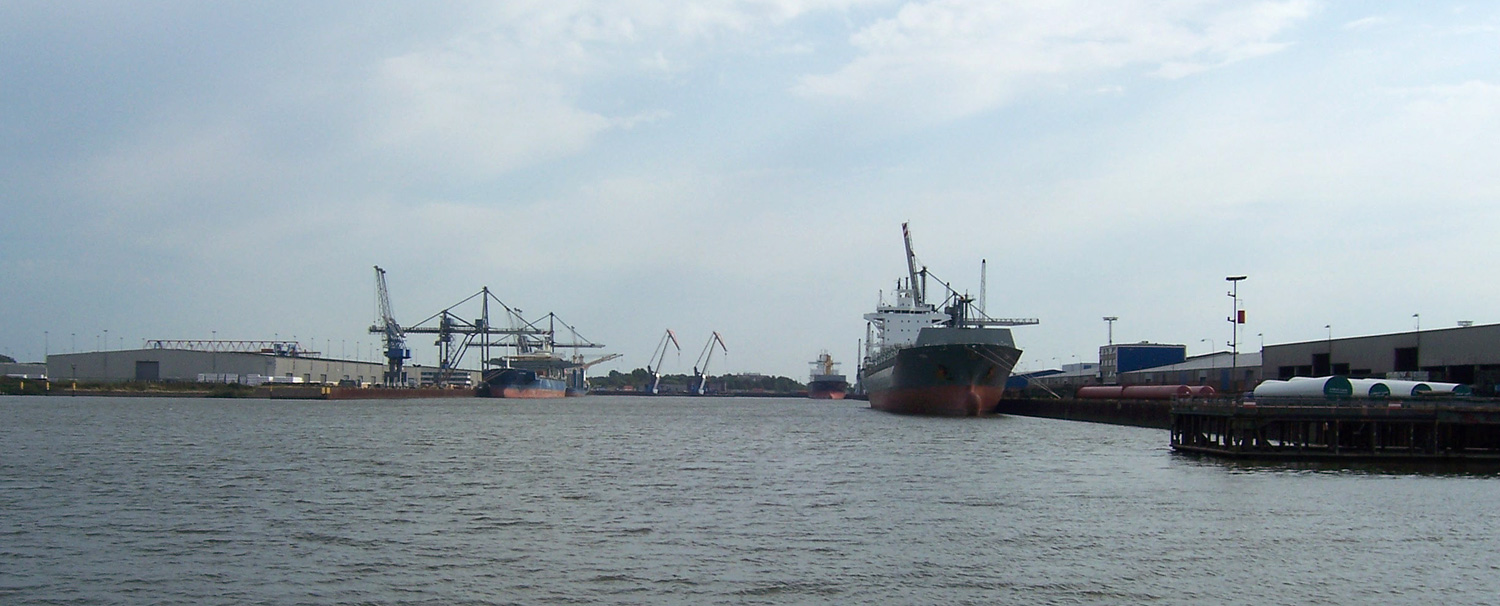
Neustädter Hafen

=== Bremen ===
Hemelingen urban district comprises the basins for inland navigation:

- Fuldahafen
- Werrahafen
- Allerhafen

Überseestadt urban area, besides the former Überseehafen area, still contains some active basins:

- Europahafen
- Holz- und Fabrikenhafen ("Wood and Factories Harbour")
- Getreidehafen ("Cereal Harbour")

Häfen urban district, right bank:

- Dock harbours, protected by Oslebshausen lock: 7 basins called Industriehäfen ("Industrial Harbours")
- open river bank beneath Stahlwerke Bremen metallurgic plant: Mittelsbürener Hafen, also called Klöcknerhafen from a former owner of the plant

Häfen urban district, left bank:

- the small Hohentorshafen
- Neustädter Hafen (named from the urban district of Neustadt – "New City") with 2 basins near the dispatching area of Güterverkehrszentrum Bremen

Blumenthal urban district:

- the sea port of Farge power station
- the petrol port of a federal petrol reserve
- the car shipping port on the quay of the former Bremer Vulkan shipyard.

=== Bremerhaven ===
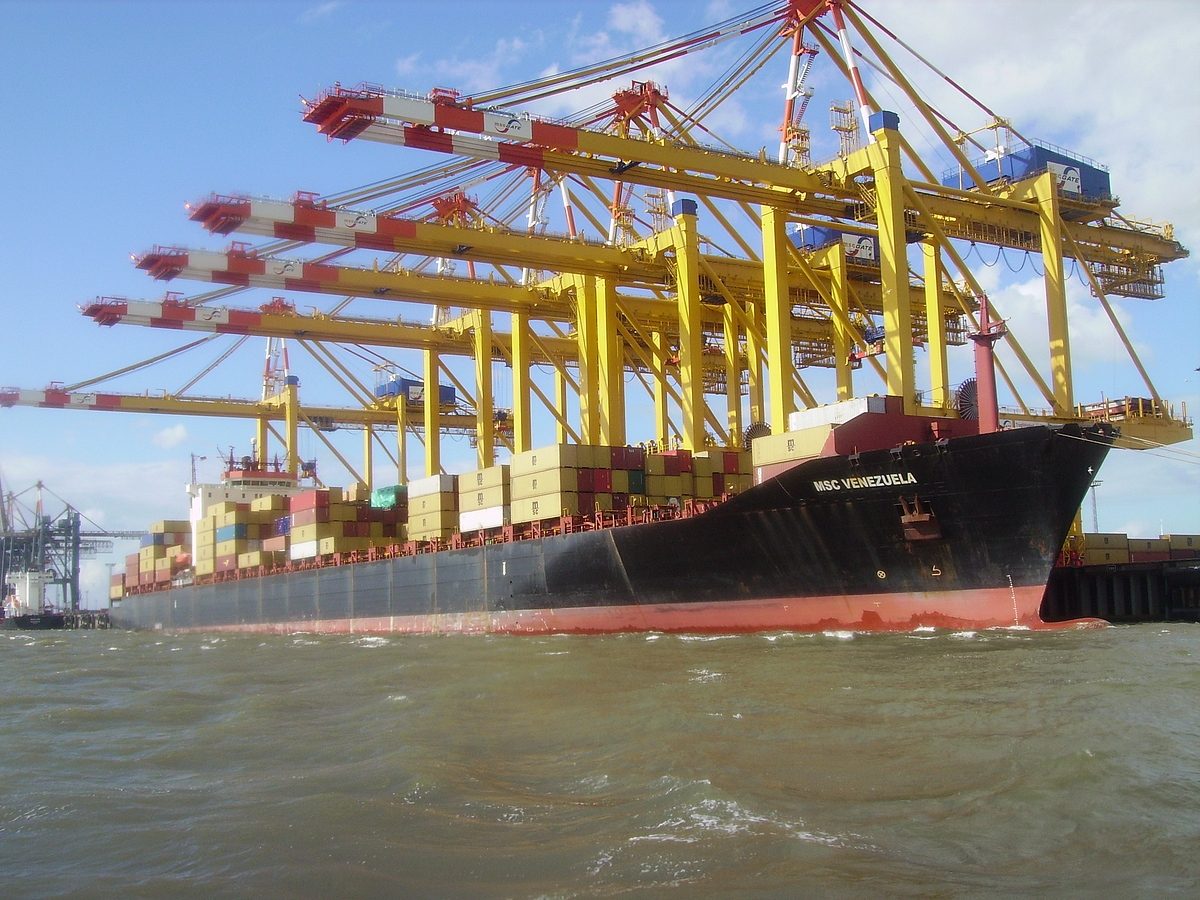
Bremerhaven container terminal

Fischereihafen urban district:

- Dock harbour of deep-sea fishery

Exclave of Bremen city:

- Dockports:
  - Kaiserhäfen ("Emperor's Ports")
  - Car shipping port
  - Lloyd Werft shipyard
- Passenger port Columbuskaje
- Open container terminals I to III

Weddewarden urban district:

- Open container terminal IV

== Sources & weblinks ==
- Manfred Rech, Gefundene Vergangenheit – Archäologie des Mittelalters in Bremen, Bremer Archäologische Blätter, Beiheft 3/2004, ISBN 3-7749-3233-6, (background informations of an exhibition on archeological findings of medieval Bremen in Bremen state museum of cultural history), p. 104 ff., chap. IV.C.: Die Häfen an Balge und Schlachte ("The ports on Balge river and Schlachte quay")https://www.bremenports.de/en/
- Ludwig Franzius: Die Korrektion der Unterweser (1888), with a collection of maps as supplement, available without reservation in the reading-room of Staatsarchiv Bremen
- http://www.bremenports.de/files/2/65/128/ZahlenDatenFakten.pdf PDF
- Heinrich Flügel (1914, thesis): Die deutschen Welthäfen Hamburg und Bremen. 420 pages (Reprint 2012, ISBN 9783954270972) example of the text (PDF; 2,3 MB)
- WeserKontor GmbH (26. Februar 2014): Seehäfen & Seeschifffahrt → Bremische Häfen
- Senator für Wirtschaft, Arbeit und Häfen (Bremish Department for Economics & Ports, 06.03.2014): Neues Hafenkonzept setzt auf Nachhaltigkeit
