= Bremen-Vegesack =

Vegesack
- District
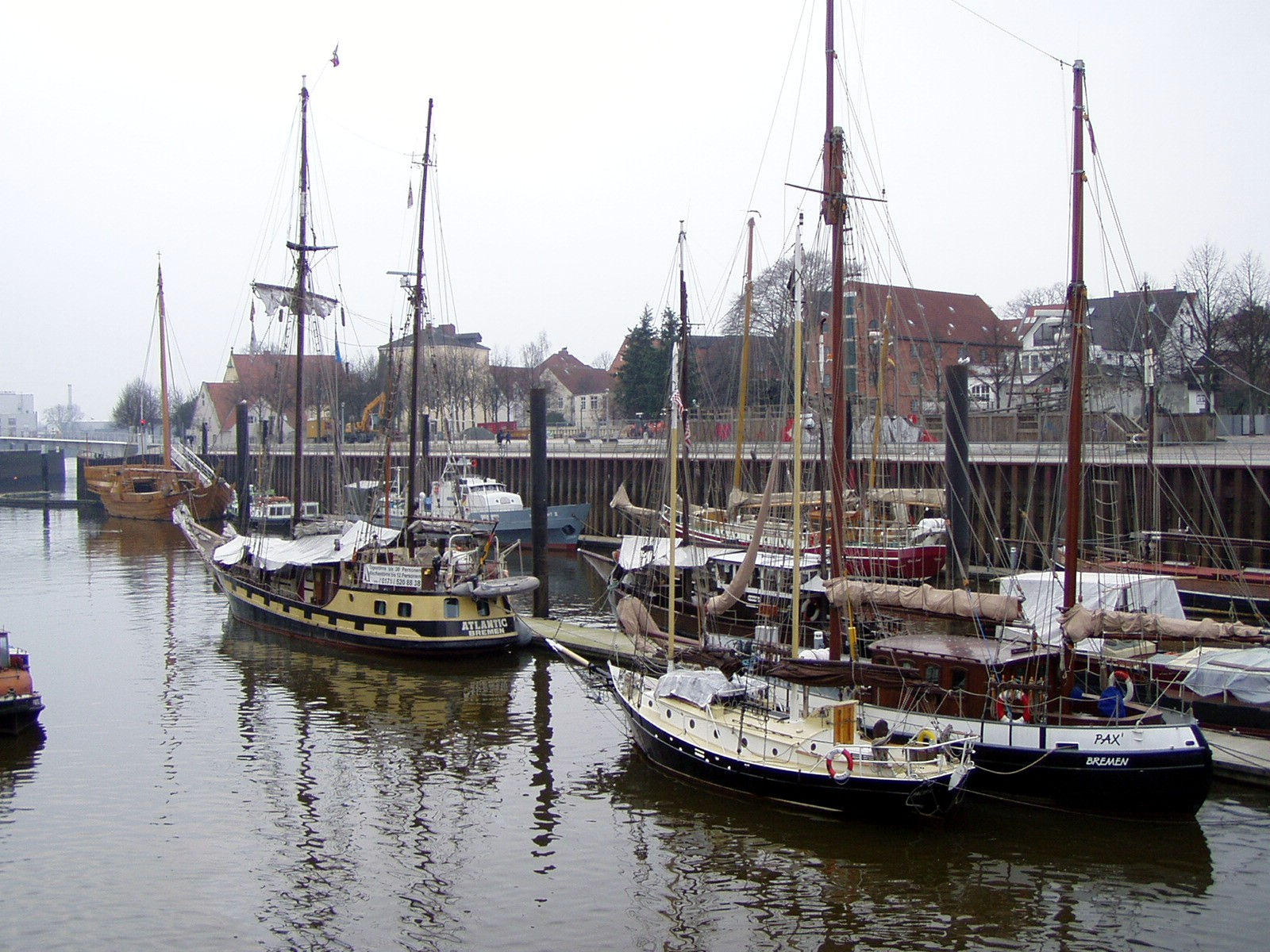
- Harbour in Bremen-Vegesack

- City of Bremen with Vegesack highlighted
- Country: Germany
- State: Free Hanseatic City of Bremen
- City: Bremen
- Subdistricts (km^{2}/inhabitants): list: Vegesack (1.7/6,617); Grohn (2.0/6,159); Schönebeck (2.5/5,562); Aumund-Hammersbeck (3.1/7,980); Fähr-Lobbendorf (2.3/8,187)

Area
  - Total: 11.87 km^{2} (4.58 sq mi)
  - Rank: 13/23

Population (2020-12-31)
  - Total: 34,757
  - Rank: 7/23
  - Density: 2,928/km^{2} (7,584/sq mi)
  - Rank: 9/23
- Alien population: 13.46% (rank 10/23)
- Unemployment rate: 18.4% (rank 2/23)
- Website: Website Ortsamt Vegesack

Vegesack (German: [ˈfeːɡəzak]) is a northern district of Bremen, the capital of the German state Free Hanseatic City of Bremen (Freie Hansestadt Bremen).

== Geography ==
Vegesack is located about 20 km (12 mi) north from the centre of Bremen-city at the mouth of the river Lesum, beside the river Weser (53°10′07″N 8°37′30″E). Abutting the district of Vegesack to the northwest is the district of Blumenthal, in the southeast the district of Burglesum. Across the river Weser is the Lower Saxony village Lemwerder, connected to Vegesack by a ferry service.

Historical population
Year	Pop.	±% p.a.
1812	1,379	—
1883	3,811	+1.44%
1905	4,133	+0.37%
1960	35,193	+3.97%
2003	34,505	−0.05%
2015	33,466	−0.25%

== History ==
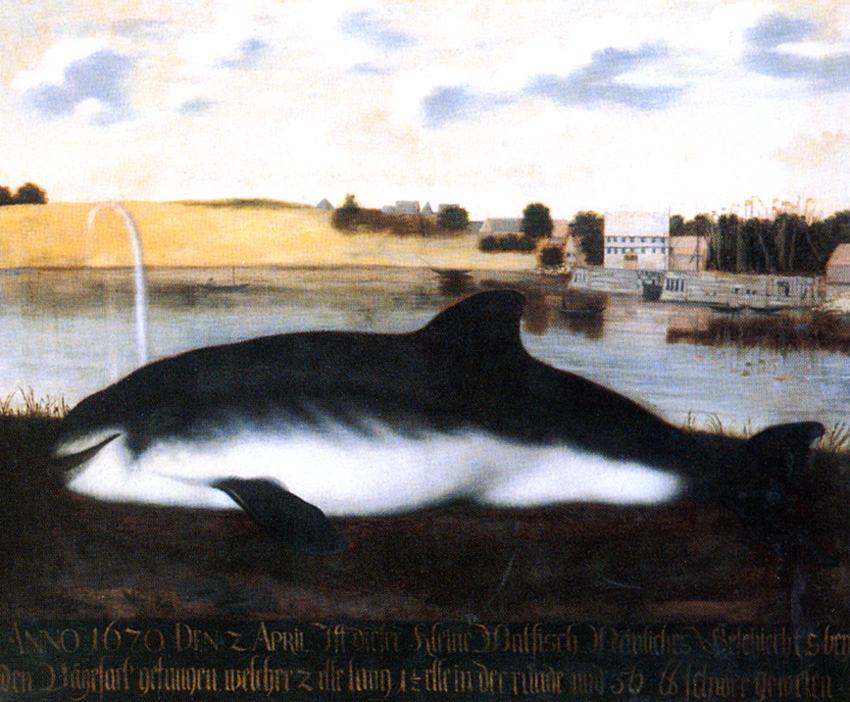
Beached whale at Vegesack harbor in 1670 by local painter Franz Wulfhagen shows the earliest known picture of Vegesack.

Vegesack was established long before the 14th century. At that time the mouth of the river Lesum and the small brook Aue to the river Weser was a preferred and protected berth for sailing ships in the winter time or in the stormy seasons. Therefore, the first buildings might have been a few workshops and accommodations and pubs for the sailors. After the first mention of a ferry across the Weser in the 14th century, the name "Vegesack" was first used in 1453. The source and the meaning of the name is unknown but might be derived from the pub "Thom Fegesacke".

In its long history Vegesack often changed hands. In 1648 it became Swedish, 1712 Danish, 1802 Bremish and 1810 French. In 1850 Vegesack received town privileges and in 1939 it became again part of the city of Bremen.

From 1619 to 1623 the first artificial harbour of Germany, and one of the first in Europe, was built in Vegesack. The reason for this was the growth of shallows in the river Weser, which blocked big sailing ships from reaching Bremen's harbour. Goods were then transshipped in the Vegesack-harbour to smaller boats or horse-drawn vehicles and transported to Bremen. With the new harbour the importance of Vegesack increased rapidly.

The importance of Vegesack can be seen in the following:

In 1863 the forerunner of the German life boat service (German: Deutsche Gesellschaft zur Rettung Schiffbrüchiger) was founded in Bremen by Adolph Bermpohl, a navigation-teacher in Vegesack.

In 1893 a fishing company was founded which became, in the mid-1930s, Europe's biggest herring fleet; Vegesack was the port of registry of this company which was closed in the 1960s.

In 1805 the Lange shipyard was founded by Johann Lange. In 1817 this company constructed Germany's first steaming ship Die Weser.

In the first half of the 19th century Vegesack was the home of the Lange and the Ulrich shipyards. Both were the predecessors of the Bremer Vulkan shipyard and the Janssen/Sager shipyard. With these three shipyards, Vegesack was the greatest and most important shipbuilding site on the Weser river for a long time.

In 1896 the shipyard Bremer Vulkan was founded by some Bremen politicians and merchants. It became the greatest shipyard in civilian shipbuilding before World War I. The so-called Bremer Vulkan Verbund AG or Vulkan Group became Germany's greatest shipbuilding company in the 1970s with altogether about 22,000 workers. The Vegesack shipyard closed in 1997.

In 1875 the Lürssen shipyard was founded and is one of the greatest German shipyards today. While the headquarters is located directly at the Vegesack harbour, the production facilities are located on the opposite side of the Weser in Lemwerder as well as in the former Vulkan area.

== Culture and sights ==
=== Museums ===
Sail training ship Schulschiff Deutschland, called The White Swan of the Lower-Weser. It is a pure sailing ship without auxiliary engine and the last German full-rigged three-master ship, today owned and operated by the German Training Ship Association, Bremen. Constructed in 1927 by the Joh. C. Tecklenborg shipyard in Geestemünde, which is now part of the city of Bremerhaven, the ship was listed as a historical monument in 1994.

Schloß Schönebeck (Castle Schönebeck), built middle of 14th century by Johann von Oumunde (=Aumund), head of the Knights of Oumunde. Reconstructed in the 17th century, today it is used as a local museum for exhibitions and exclusive events.

=== Theatre ===
Since 1989, the Statt-Theater-Vegesack, a semi-professional troupe of actors, has performed both classical and self-composed plays. The performances take place in the Bürgerhaus Vegesack community centre.

=== Music ===
The event centre KITO, hosted in an old storehouse, offers jazz, blues, folk and classical concerts and political theatre. The KUBA, a old freight station is a event centre.

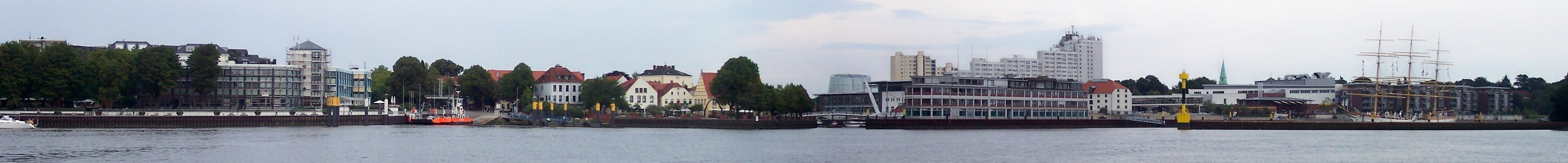

=== Parks ===
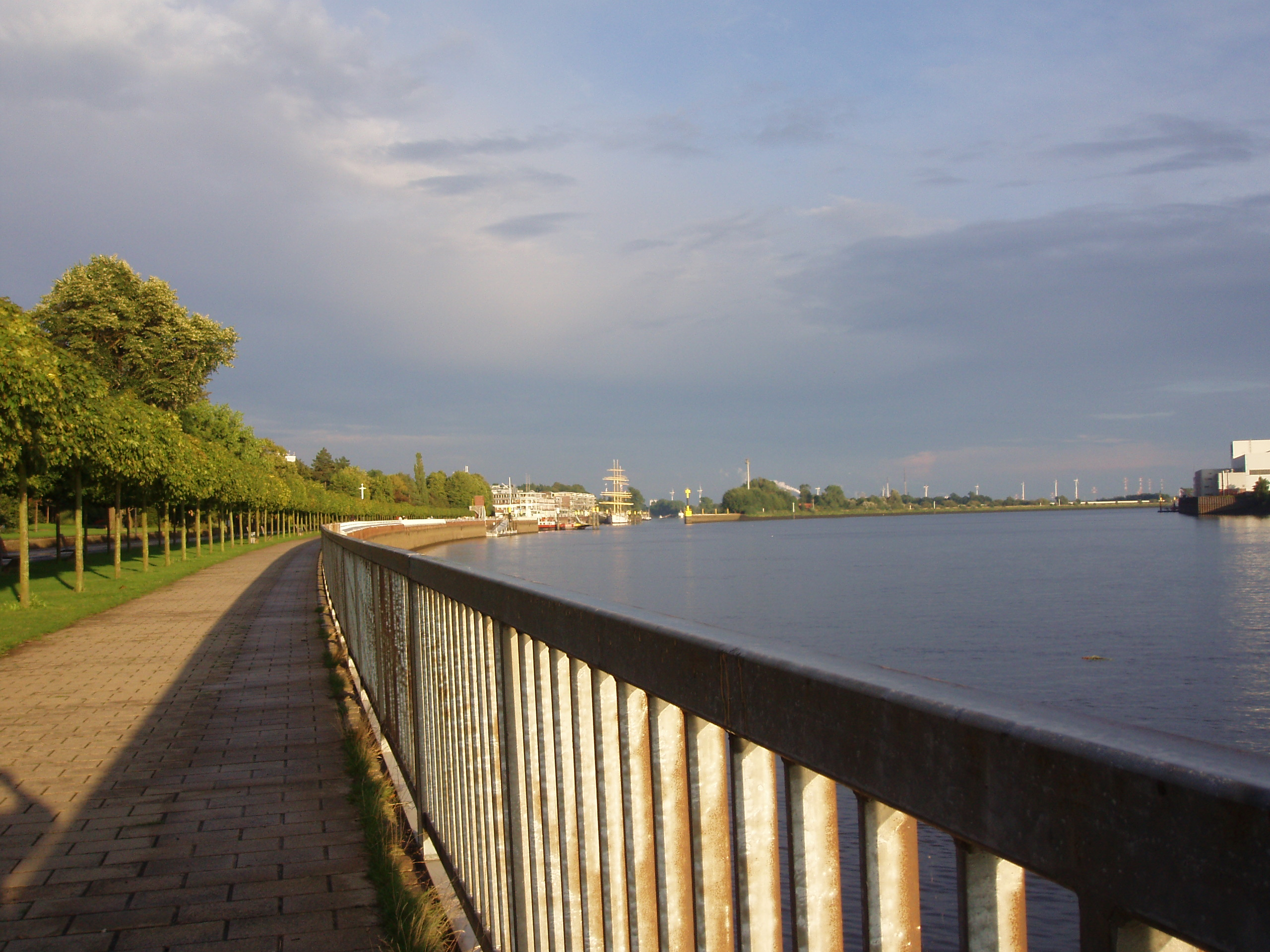
The Weserpromenade.

Along the river Weser is the Stadtgarten (town garden) stretches along the Weserpromenade between the ferry and the Gläserne Werft (shipyard showcase). At the bottom of the scarp you can find many foreign trees and a rose garden, at the top are villas and captain's houses.

=== Regular events ===
The Vegesacker Hafenfest (Vegesack harbour festival) takes place on the first weekend in June. Three days full of live music, shanty choirs, maritime attractions and happy people.

The Festival Maritim (beginning of August) also offers a lot of international maritime live music, Kleinkunst, open-air cinema and "Kutterpullen", a rowing contest.

At the beginning of September, Vegesack celebrates the Vegesacker Markt (Vegesack market); a fair with fairground rides, raffle booths, shooting galleries and much more. In 2005 the fair was held for the 197th time. It starts with the pageant across the city, and ends with the wet funeral of the market-witch in the Weser.

== Transportation ==
- Vegesack is connected to the A 27 by the Autobahn 270.
- A railway branch line, operated by NordWestBahn, links Vegesack to Bremen central station and Verden. Public transport is served by several bus lines of the Bremer Straßenbahn AG.
- A car ferry connects Vegesack and Lemwerder.

== Education and science ==
Constructor University, formerly Jacobs University Bremen, is located in the Grohn district of Vegesack, on the site of a former military barracks.

== Notable people ==
=== Born in Vegesack ===
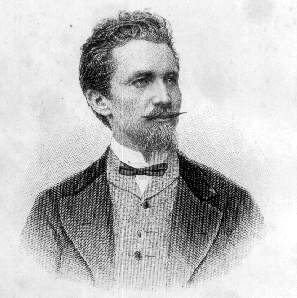
Friedrich Gerhard Rohlfs

- Heinrich Behmann (1891–1970), mathematician and professor in Halle (Saale)
- Friedrich Gerhard Rohlfs (1831–1896), African explorer and writer
- Günther Schwarberg (1926–2008), journalist and author
- Jürgen Trittin (born 1954), Alliance 90/The Greens politician and former Federal Minister for the Environment
- August Wilmanns (1833–1917), classical philologist and director-general of the Königliche Bibliothek.

=== Associated with Vegesack ===
- Jan Böhmermann (born 1981), satirist, television presenter, and comedian
- Leo Drabent (1899–1944), anti-fascist resistance leader in Bremen
- Erich Lackner (1913–1992), civil engineer and professor
- Walter Momper (born 1945), politician and former Governing Mayor of Berlin; raised in Vegesack
- Bernd Neumann (born 1942), politician and former Federal Government Commissioner for Culture and the Media
- Albrecht Wilhelm Roth (1757–1834), physician and botanist
- Carl Schuchhardt (1859–1943), prehistorian and director at the Neues Museum in Berlin
