= Valentin submarine pens =

Damaged German submarine factory

Valentin submarine factory
- Part of Third Reich
- Rekum port (Weser River, Bremen)
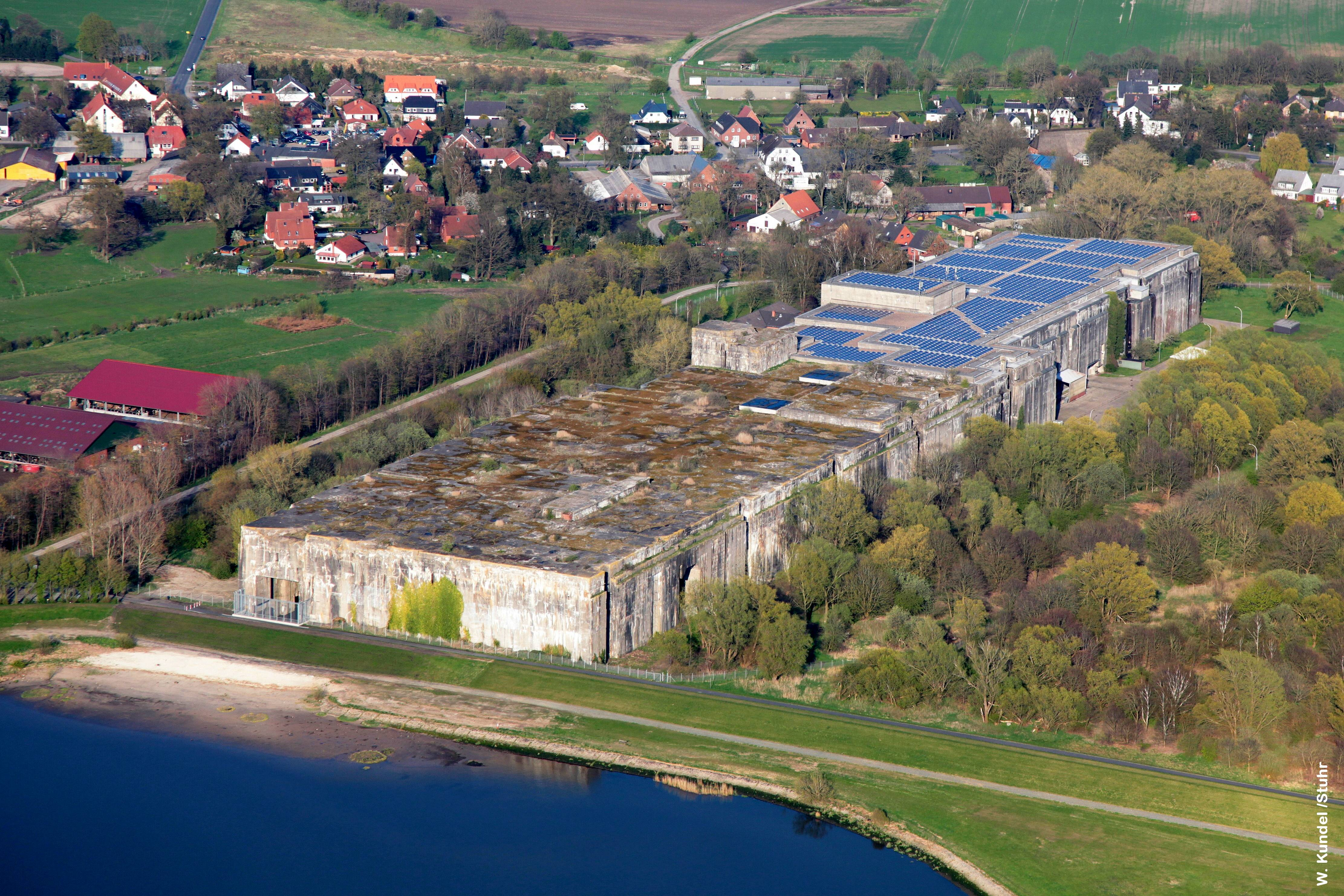
- Aerial view of Valentin (2012), with modern solar panels at right

Site information
- Type: blockhouse
- Open to the public: Free entrance, self guided walking tours, electronic audio guide available

Location
- Coordinates: 53°13′01″N 8°30′23″E

Site history
- Built: February 1943 to March 1945 (unfinished)
- Materials: Ferrous concrete

The Valentin submarine factory is a protective shelter on the Weser River at the Bremen suburb of Rekum, built to produce and launch German U-boats during World War II. Built between 1943 and March 1945 using forced labor, the factory sustained damage from air raids before U-boat production could commence. It was the largest fortified U-boat facility in Germany, second only to the facilities at Brest in France.

As a manufacturing facility, it differed from conventional U-boat pens, which were designed for housing and servicing operational U-boats.

== Construction ==
Construction of Valentin

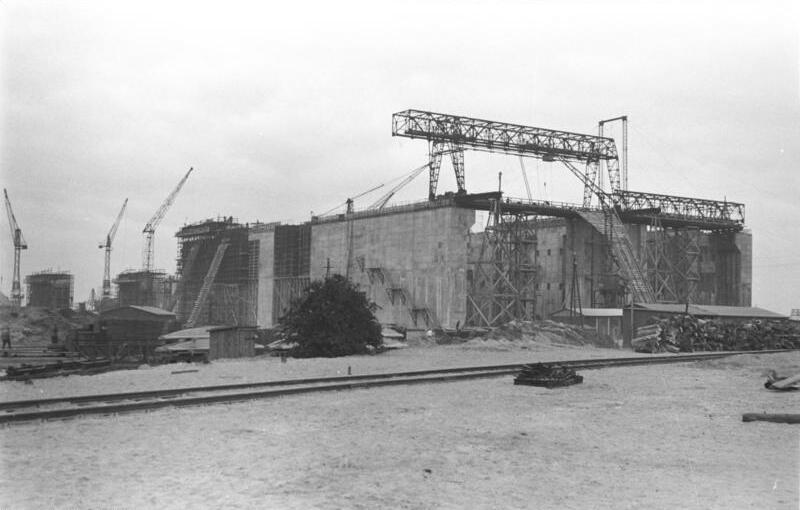
With the walls complete

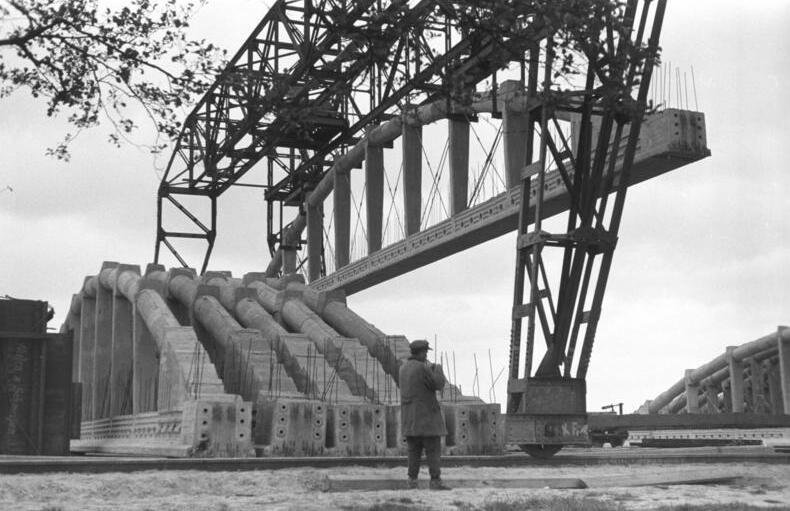
One of the roof trusses is lifted into place

Production of U-boats by German shipyards had been dramatically reduced as a result of bombing by the Royal Air Force and the United States Army Air Forces, necessitating the creation of bomb-proof production sites. Many such sites were in use in 1944, including the U-boat pen Nordsee III on the German island of Helgoland, Fink II and Elbe II in Hamburg and Kilian in Kiel. Other sites in Germany and other occupied countries were under construction or planned, such as Hornisse in Bremen, Elbe XVII and Wenzel in Hamburg, Wespe in Wilhelmshaven, Kaspar in Kiel. Under the codename Valentin a submarine factory was to be built directly on the Weser river between the Bremen suburbs Rekum and Farge. It was intended the facility would be used for the final assembly of Type XXI submarines, starting in April 1945 with three boats and from August 1945 a monthly delivery of a minimum of 14 boats. A second bunker called Valentin II was planned as well.

The bunker is around 426 metres (1,398 ft) long and 97 metres (318 ft) wide at its widest point; the walls are 4.5 metres (15 ft) thick. The height of the structure is between 22.5 and 27 metres (74 and 89 ft). The roof was constructed using dozens of large, reinforced concrete arches, manufactured on-site and individually lifted into place. The void space around the arches was then filled with concrete to create the large, thick slab.

Most of the roof is around 4.5 metres (15 ft) thick but part of it is 7 metres (23 ft) thick as the Germans began adding to its thickness before the bunker was even completed. Construction required 650,000 cubic yards (500,000 m^{3}) of concrete. The design and oversight of the Valentin's construction was carried out by the Organisation Todt. Marineoberbaurat Edo Meiners was in charge overall; the on-site supervising engineer was Erich Lackner. He had a lengthy post-war career, becoming one of Germany's most prominent civil engineers.

By March 1945, the facility was 90% completed and most of the necessary machine tools had been installed. Production of U-boats was due to begin within two months.

== Planned use ==
A German plan showing a cross-section of the bunker, including the deep-pool for the testing of completed U-boats

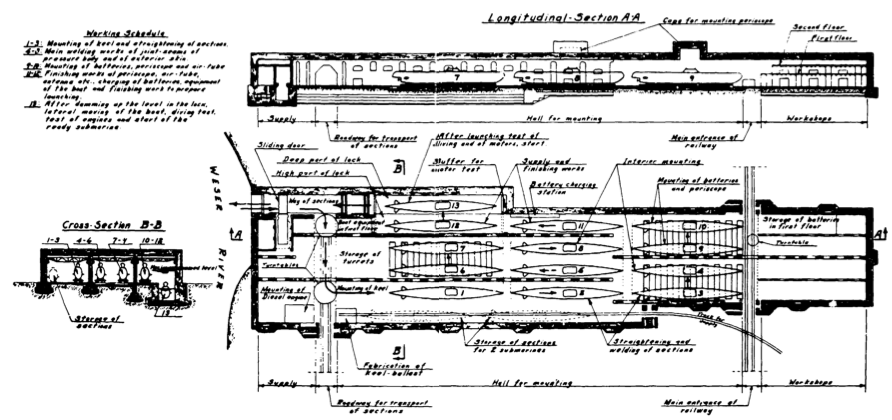
Plan of Valentin, taken from the 1946 US Air Force report on the results of Project Ruby

After completion, the bunker would have had a work–force of around 4,500 slave workers. Under the management of the Bremer Vulkan shipyard, it would assemble U-boats. Each would be built from eight, large, pre-fabricated sections manufactured in other shipyards such as Bremer Vulkan, Deschimag AG Weser with its bunker Hornisse, Kriegsmarinewerft Wilhelmshaven with bunker Wespe and Deschimag Seebeckwerft in Bremerhaven, and then shipped to Valentin on barges.

The bunker was to house 13 assembly bays (called Taktplatz in German, or Takt for short), each carrying out one part of the assembly process. Two bays, Takt 9 and Takt 10, were underneath box-like structures on the roof that allowed the extra height needed for the installation of periscopes, snorkels and antennas. The two last bays, Takt 12 and Takt 13, were separated by high walls from the rest of the building and could be closed by water-tight floodgates. Takt 13, the final bay, was a dry dock with an 8-metre (26 ft) deep pool of water. The two separated bays could be flooded to give a total water depth of about 20 metres from the bottom of Takt 13's dry dock to the water-surface at the building's roof-level. Takt 13 was to be used for leak–tests of the completed U-boats as well as engine starts and other tests. In addition to the 13 assembly bays, the bunker housed workshops and store-rooms for the prefabricated sections, diesel-engines and batteries, and storage tanks for fuel and lubricants.

The gateway in the western wall could be closed by means of a sliding bomb-proof door which opened to a small canal, a creek and then directly onto the Weser river. Through this, sections of submarine would be delivered by barges and completed submarines could leave.

Operations at Valentin were intended to commence by late 1944, but was postponed to mid-1945 due in part to a combination of manpower and supply shortages and bombing. It is likely that production would have been limited due to the severe quality control problems experienced with the prefabricated sections. Albert Speer (the Reich armaments minister) had directed that the sections be made by inland companies and then assembled at the shipyards so as to ease production. However, these companies had little experience in shipbuilding resulting in lengthy re-working to rectify flaws in the sections. Out of the 118 boats completed, only four were rated fit for combat before the war ended in Europe.

== Labour force ==
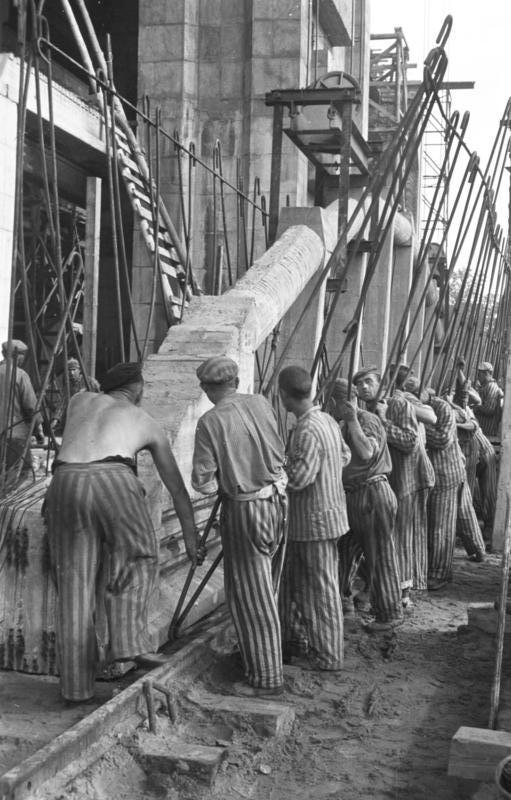
The partially completed Valentin bunker in 1944 and some of the workforce of forced labourers

Most of the 10,000–12,000 people who built Valentin were slave workers, who lived in seven camps located between 3 and 8 kilometres (1.9 and 5.0 mi) from the bunker. Some were housed in the nearby Bremen-Farge concentration camp, the largest subcamp of the Neuengamme concentration camp complex, with 2,092 prisoners as of 25 March 1945. The camp facility was erected close by at a large naval fuel oil storage facility; some prisoners were accommodated in an empty underground fuel tank. Among the labourers were mainly non–German concentration camp inmates (Fremdarbeiter) as well as Russian, Polish, and French prisoners of war, but also some German criminals and political prisoners. (Note: These were befristete Vorbeugungshäftlinge ("temporary preventive custody prisoners"); some were prisoner functionaries. The "Camp Elder" was Erich Meissner, a German political prisoner (described by another ex–prisoner as a brutal alcoholic), who became mayor of Leipzig post–war. See Neuengamme / Bremen-Farge, Holocaust Encyclopedia.)

The camp was initially run by the SS, but the expansion of the camp network in the area led to a shortage of personnel. By mid-1944, the camp was commanded by an army captain, Ulrich Wahl, and the prisoners were guarded by a detachment of naval infantry. Only a handful of SS men remained involved in the running of the camp.

Work on the bunker took place around the clock, with personnel forced to work 12-hour shifts from 7am to 7pm. This resulted in a high death rate amongst the prisoners. However, the identity of only 553 victims, mostly Frenchmen, has been confirmed. The total number of deaths may be as high as 6,000 as the names of the Polish and Russian dead were not recorded. The worst work on the site was that of the so-called iron detachments (Eisenkommandos), responsible for the movement of iron and steel girders. A French survivor, Raymond Portefaix, stated that a prisoner's life expectancy fell dramatically on being assigned to one of these detachments. He described the Eisenkommandos as suicide squads.

The prisoners held at the Neuengamme concentration camp and its subcamps were evacuated in April 1945, just before the capture of the area by the British army. Many were placed on board the SS Cap Arcona. This German ship was heavily laden with around 5,000 concentration–camp prisoners when she was attacked and sunk by the RAF on 3 May 1945; only 350 prisoners survived. The sinking took place just one day before the German surrender at Lüneburg Heath, the unconditional surrender of German forces in the Netherlands, Denmark and North-West Germany. It is estimated that more than 6,000 workers died during the building of Valentin.

== Bombing ==
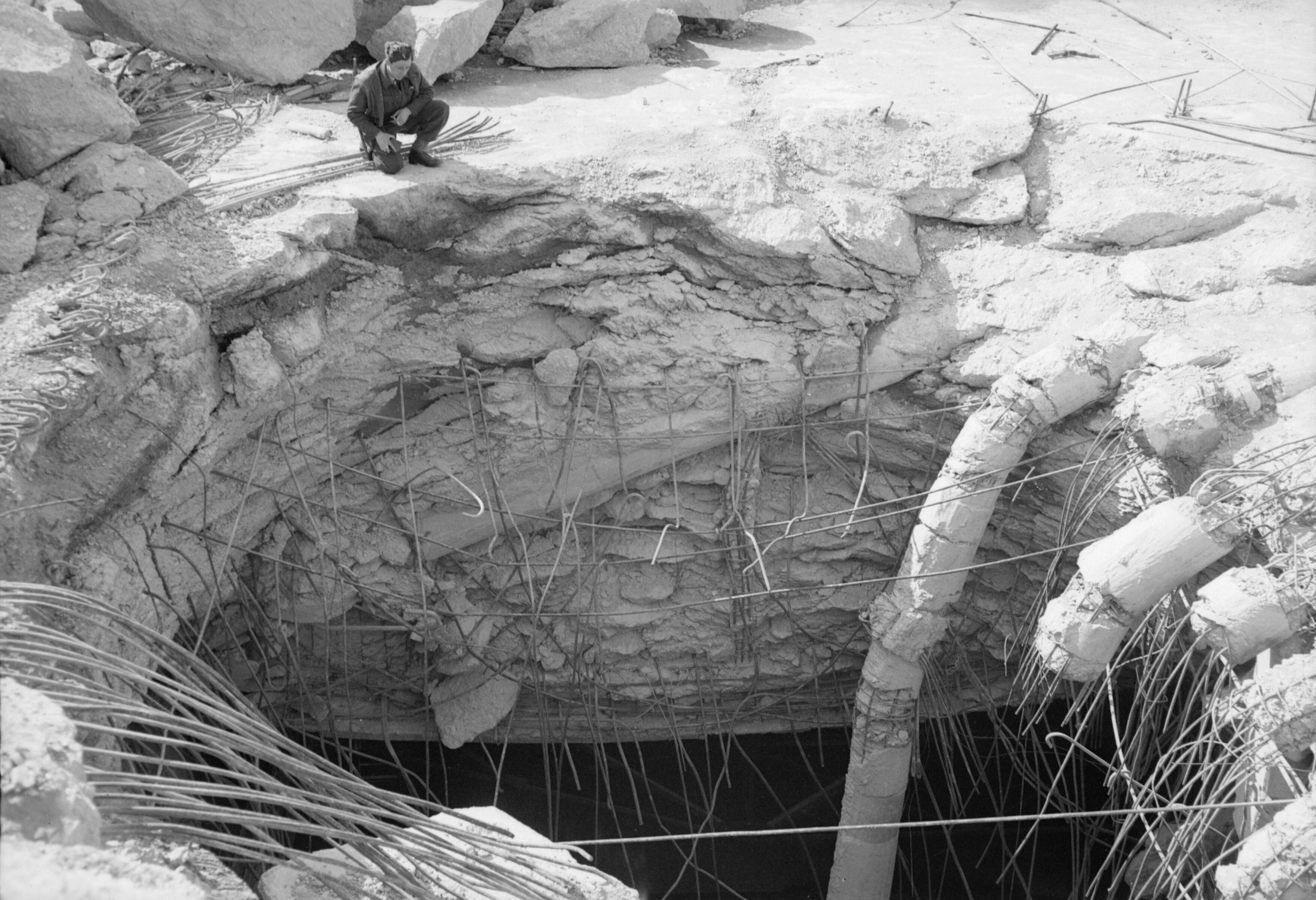
From above

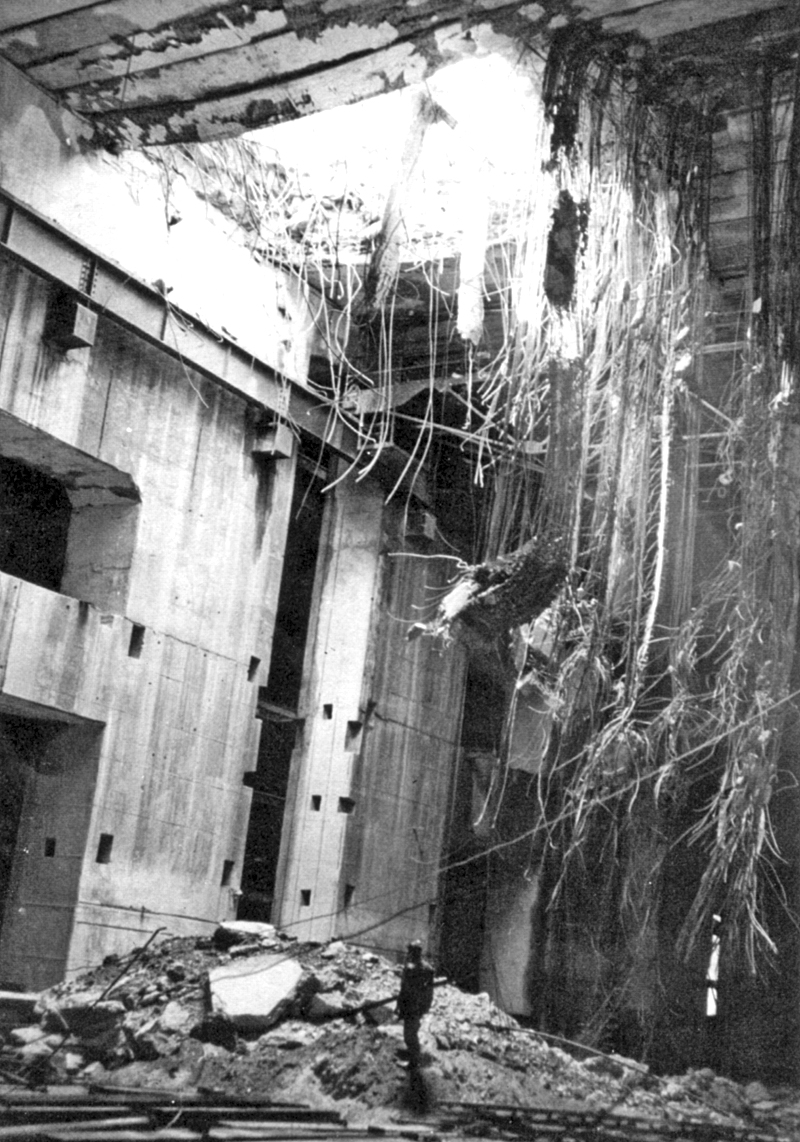
From below

Roof penetrations from the 1945 RAF Grand Slam strikes on the bunker

The Valentin factory was attacked by the RAF on 27 March 1945. The attacking force consisted of twenty Avro Lancaster heavy bombers of 617 Squadron which had, after the "Dambusters" raid, developed precision bombing methods. Simultaneously, a force of 115 Lancasters bombed the nearby fuel oil storage depot in the village of Schwanewede. The bombers were escorted by ninety RAF North American Mustang fighters of 11 Group The Lancasters attacking Valentin each carried a single large earthquake bomb – seven carried the 5 ton 'Tallboy', thirteen carried the 10 ton 'Grand Slam'. Two 'Grand Slam's hit the target and penetrated about half-way through the 15-foot (4.6 m) thick ferrous concrete roof before exploding. The explosions blew large holes in the remaining thickness of the roof and brought down around 1,000 tons of debris into the chamber below. Workers who were inside the bunker at the time survived, as the bombs did not penetrate the roof before detonating. Another bomb caused damage to a nearby electricity plant, workshops and a concrete mixing plant.

Fortunately for the British, the two bombs struck and penetrated the 4.5-metre (15 ft) thick west section of the roof. Post–war American analysis suggested the 7-metre (23 ft) thick, east section would have been able to resist even the Grand Slams, although not without significant damage, and it is unlikely that it would have survived repeated hits.

Three days later, on 30 March, the US Eighth Air Force attacked Valentin with Disney bombs. These were large 4,500 lb (2,040 kg), weapons with hard steel casings, rocket-assisted to increase their penetrating power. Sixty were launched but only one hit the target, causing little damage. However, considerable damage was done to installations surrounding the bunker.

The factory was abandoned, and four weeks after the bombing, the area was occupied by the British Army's XXX Corps, which captured Bremen after a five-day battle.

== Post war ==
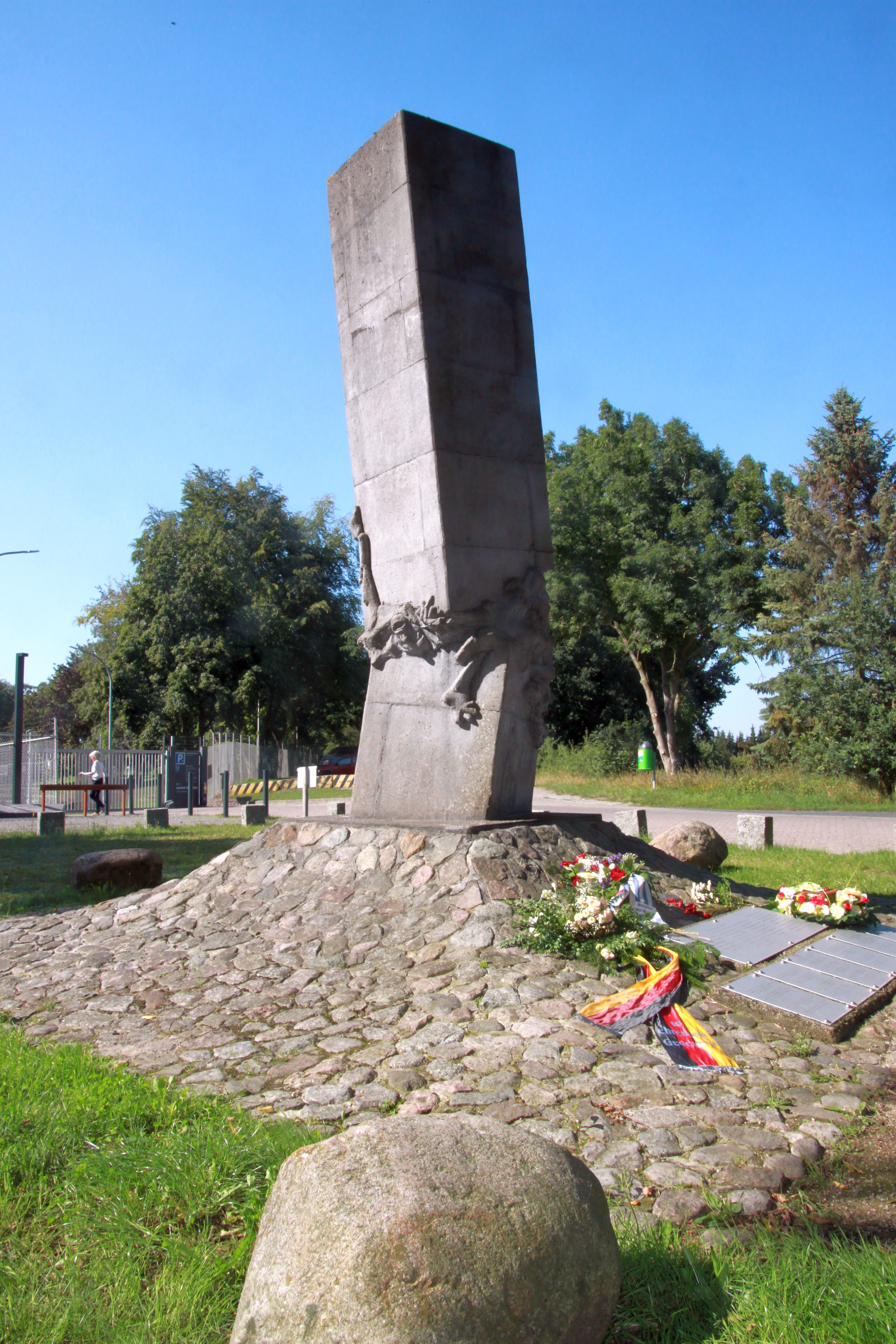
The 1983 memorial, Vernichtung durch Arbeit, commemorating the deaths and suffering of those who built Valentin (2019)

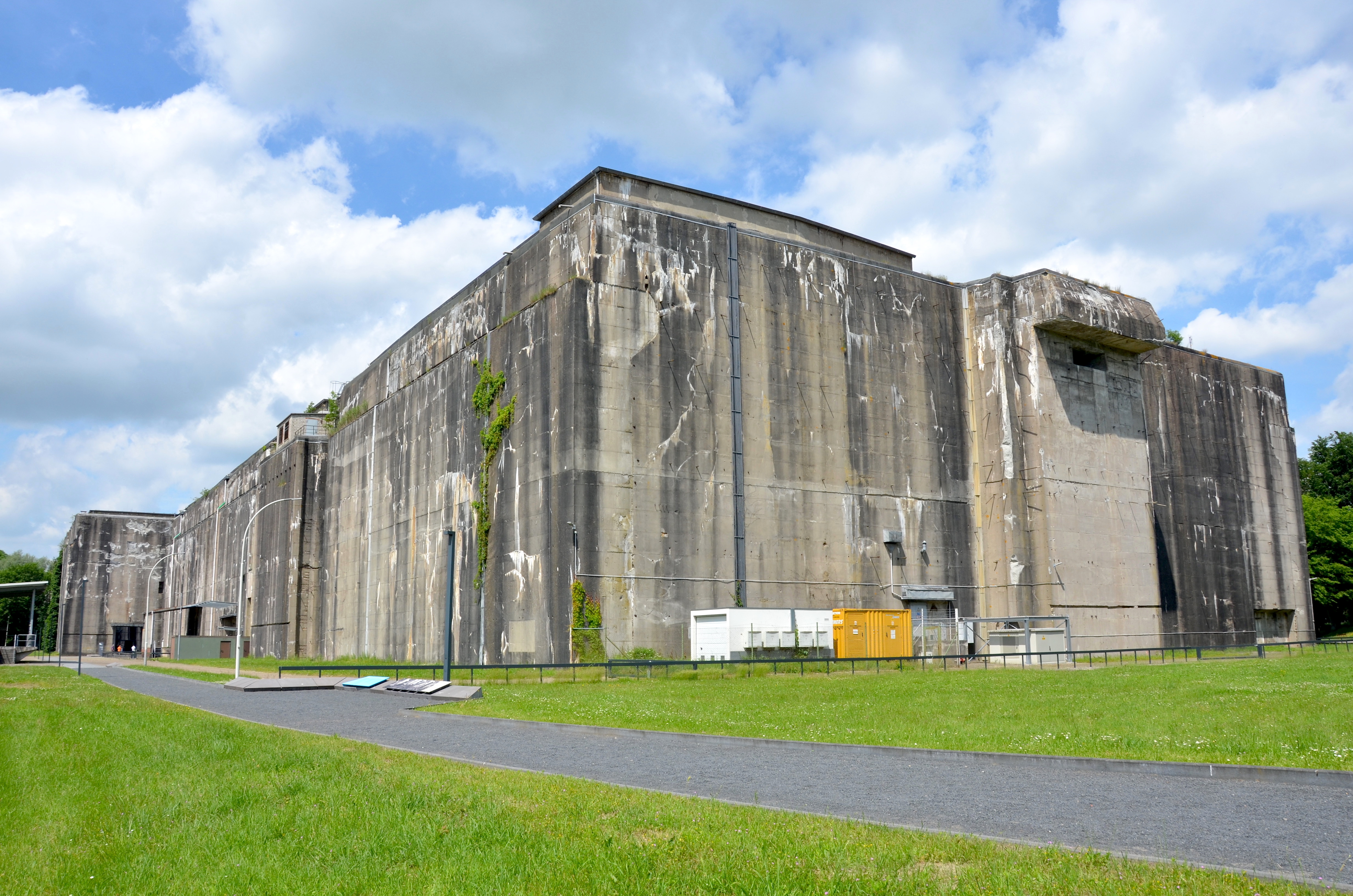
The eastern and southern sides of Valentin (2021)

After the war, when the machine tools had been removed, further bombing of Valentin was carried out. Beginning in March 1946, Project Ruby was a joint Anglo-American affair to investigate the use of penetration bombs against heavily protected concrete targets. The Valentin-bunker was bombed with inert (non-explosive) loads to protect nearby buildings and civilians, to test things like penetration capability and strength of the bomb-shell during impact. The U-boat pen Nordsee III and subterranean bunkers on the uninhabited island of Heligoland were subjected to explosive-loaded bombs to study aspects of huge explosions on massive concrete buildings. Bombs were carried by Avro Lancasters from No. 15 Squadron RAF and US Boeing B-29 Superfortress and Boeing B-17 Flying Fortress aircraft operating from RAF Marham. Around 140 sorties were flown, testing a range of different bombs.

The main conclusion of 'Project Ruby' was that "not any of the bombs tested are suitable for use against massive reinforced concrete." The idea to destroy Valentin by blasting was abandoned because the blasting would have caused severe damage to the nearby villages of Rekum and Farge including the power-station in Farge. In 1960 the bunker was taken over by the German Navy, for use as a storage depot.

In 1983, a memorial to the workers who built Valentin was erected. Titled Vernichtung durch Arbeit (Extermination through labour), it was by Bremen artist Fritz Stein.

High maintenance costs forced the German Defence Ministry to offer the bunker for sale in 2008. Military use finally came to an end on 31 December 2010. Its custodianship was passed to a group called Denkort Bunker Valentin with the intention of developing it as a museum and a memorial. The group currently offers guided tours of the bunker to the public.

== See also ==
- Bombing of Bremen in World War II
- Forced labour under German rule during World War II
