= Erich Lackner =

- Born: 13 May 1913; Himmelberg, Austria
- Died: 2 February 1992 (aged 78); Kärnten, Austria
- Education: Technische Universität Berlin
- Occupation: Civil engineer
- Spouse: Ursula Ahlbrecht (m.1941)

Erich Friedrich Michael Lackner (13 May 1913 in Himmelberg, Austria – 2 February 1992 in Kärnten) was a German civil engineer. He is considered to be one of the most important German engineers of the 20th century.

== Professional career ==
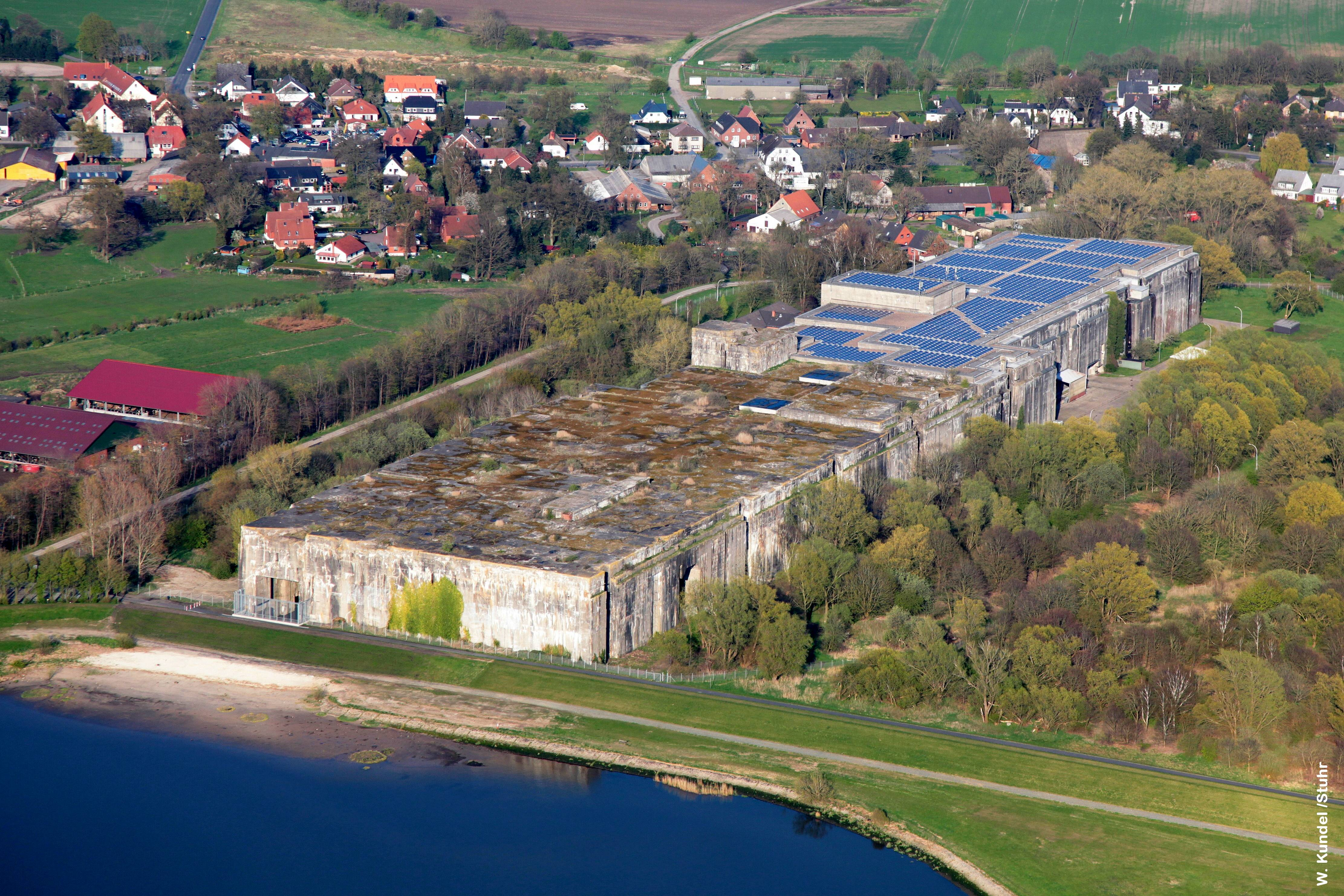
Valentin U-boat bunker in 2012

Lackner graduated from high school in Klagenfurt in 1931 and after completing studies at the Technische Hochschule in Charlottenburg (now Technische Universität Berlin) in 1937, he joined the engineering firm Agatz & Bock, which had been established the previous year. Five years later in 1942, he was promoted to partner in the firm and was made an honorary assistant to Arnold Agatz at the university. As a junior partner in the firm, Lackner was the on-site supervising engineer for the construction of the well known Valentin submarine pens. This was constructed between 1943 and 1945 under a contract from the Organisation Todt, using the labour of concentration-camp prisoners, who suffered a high death rate because of the conditions they worked under. Around 6000 are thought to have died during the bunker's construction.

After the war, Lackner was appointed as the head of the civil engineering department of the United States Port Authority tasked with repairing war-damaged ports throughout Europe. He stayed at this post until 1947 and then returned to his previous position at Agatz. After Lackner applied for a patent for a new type of anchored, pre-stressed-concrete dry dock in 1953, he oversaw the construction of dry docks in Alexandria and Karachi and numerous other projects in the ensuing years. In 1976, the firm was renamed Lackner & Partners and was acquired by Inros Group in 1997. Inros was renamed Inros Lackner AG in 2004.

== Teaching and consultative career ==
From 1964 to 1980, Lackner served as an associate professor in the department of Foundation Engineering, Soil Mechanics, and Waterpower Engineering at Leibniz University Hannover and later served as the director of the Institute for Ground Engineering and Soil Mechanics there. He published numerous technical and scientific papers in both English and German during this period.

Lackner was the first chair of the German Engineering Society's Committee for Waterfront Structures and Harbors after the committee was formed in 1949 and regularly contributed to its published recommendations for various projects. He also provided expert testimony to several inquiries of engineering disasters including a dam break that disabled the newly constructed Elbe Lateral Canal in 1976 and another dam break on the then-under-construction Rhine–Main–Danube Canal in 1979.

Lackner also served as the chairman of the Port Engineering Society (German: Hafentechnische Gesellschaft eV) for many years. In 1993, the Society began presenting the biennial Erich Lackner Award for “outstanding contributions in scientific and technical work” by young engineers.

== Personal life ==
Lackner married Ursula Ahlbrecht on 12 February 1941.

== Awards ==
- War Merit Cross with Swords
- Honorary D.Eng from Ruhr University Bochum
