= Am Wall Windmill =

German building

Mühle am Wall
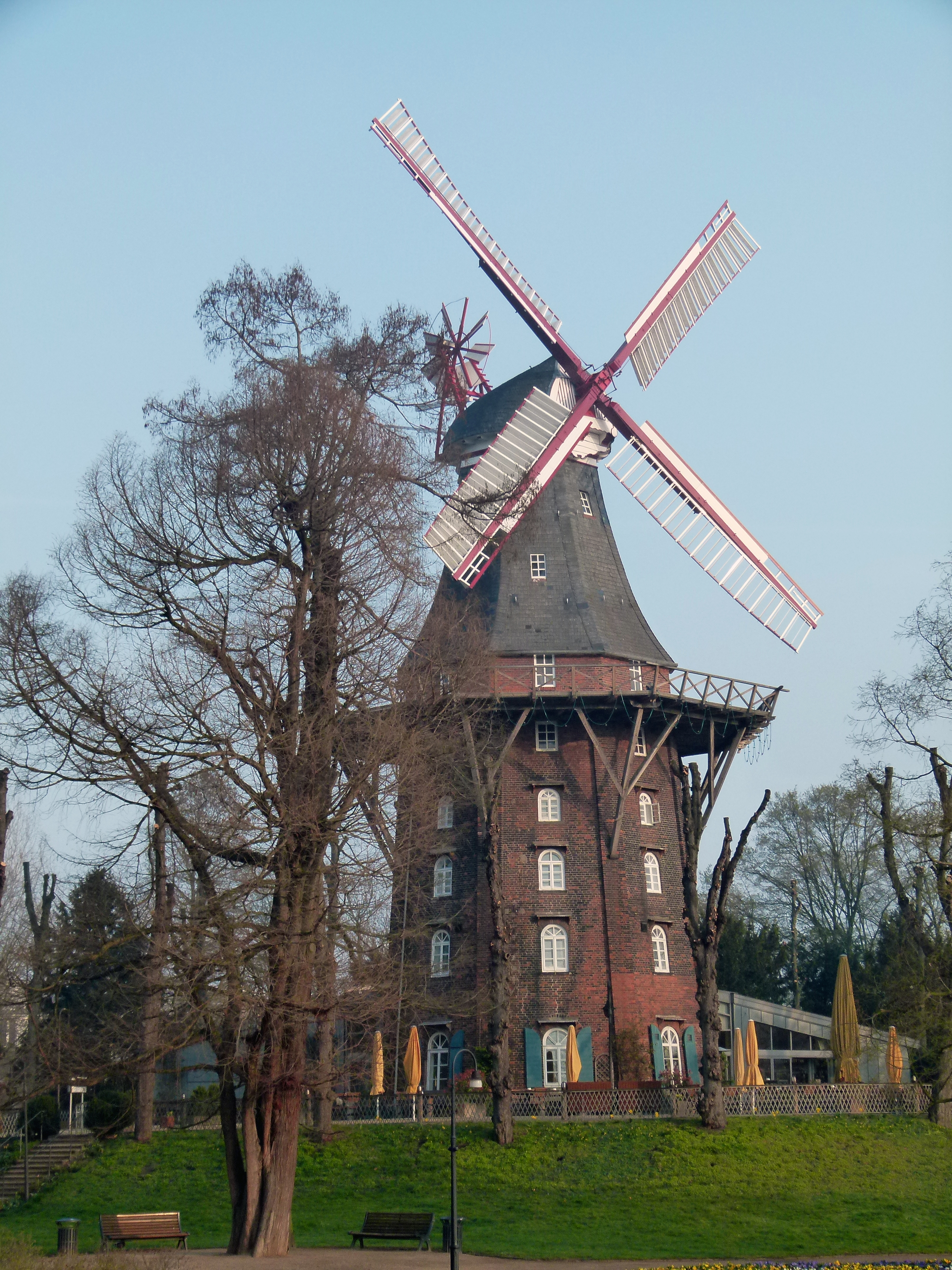

Origin
- Mill location: Bremen
- Coordinates: 53.0802°N 8.8069°E
- Year built: 1898

Information
- Smock sides: 8
- Type of sails: shuttered

The Am Wall Windmill (Herdentorswallmühle or Mühle am Wall) is a windmill in Bremen, Germany. It was fully built in 1898. The building is open to visitors and it has a restaurant.

== History ==
The first windmill on this site was constructed in 1699. The building has been destroyed by fire and rebuilt a number of times, but the current construction was completed in 1898. This design rests on an eight sided base and the upper part is steered by a wind vane. The four sails of the windmill are shuttered. This type of design is known as a smock mill or Galerieholländer.

The windmill is in the middle of a city park that was constructed on the ground where the fortifications of the city once stood. Today the building is heritage listed and inside is a restaurant.
