= Franz Wulfhagen =

German Baroque painter and engraver

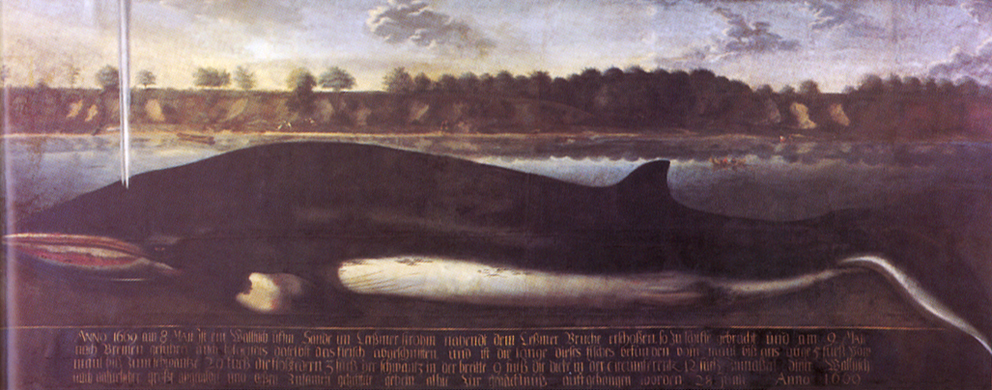
Painting of a Beached whale in Bremen town hall, 1669

Franz Wulfhagen (c. 1624–1670) was a German Baroque painter and engraver.

According to Houbraken, he was born in Bremen, but he moved to Amsterdam where he became a pupil of Rembrandt. He learned to copy his style well, and thus was able to make a living from painting the rest of his life. There are no paintings by him listed in the RKD, but he is noted there as an engraver and painter of religious works. He painted many mayors of Bremen, and these paintings hang in the town hall there.
