= Naval armour =

Protection schemes of warships

Naval armor refers to the various protections schemes employed by warships. The first ironclad warship was created in 1859, and the pace of armour advancement accelerated quickly thereafter. The emergence of battleships around the turn of the 20th century saw ships become increasingly large and well armoured. Vast quantities of heavily armoured ships were used during the World Wars, and were crucial in the outcome. The emergence of guided missiles in the last part of the 20th century has greatly reduced the utility of armor, and most modern warships are now only lightly armored.

Naval armour consists of many different designs, depending on what the armour is meant to protect against. Sloped armour and belt armour are designed to protect against shellfire; torpedo belts, bulges, and bulkheads protect against underwater torpedoes or naval mines; and armoured decks protect against air dropped bombs and long-range shellfire.

The materials that make up naval armour have evolved over time, beginning with simply wood, then softer metals like lead or bronze, to harder metals such as iron, and finally steel and composites. Iron armour saw wide use in the 1860s and 1870s, but steel armor began to take over because it was stronger, and thus less could be used. The technology behind steel armour went from simple carbon steel plates, to increasingly complex arrangements with variable alloys. Case-hardened Harvey armor was the first major development, followed by chromium alloyed and specially hardened Krupp armour. Ducol steel came into use in the 1920s, and was widely used on World War II era ships. Futuristic armor designs include electric armour, which would use electric shielding to stop projectiles.

== History ==
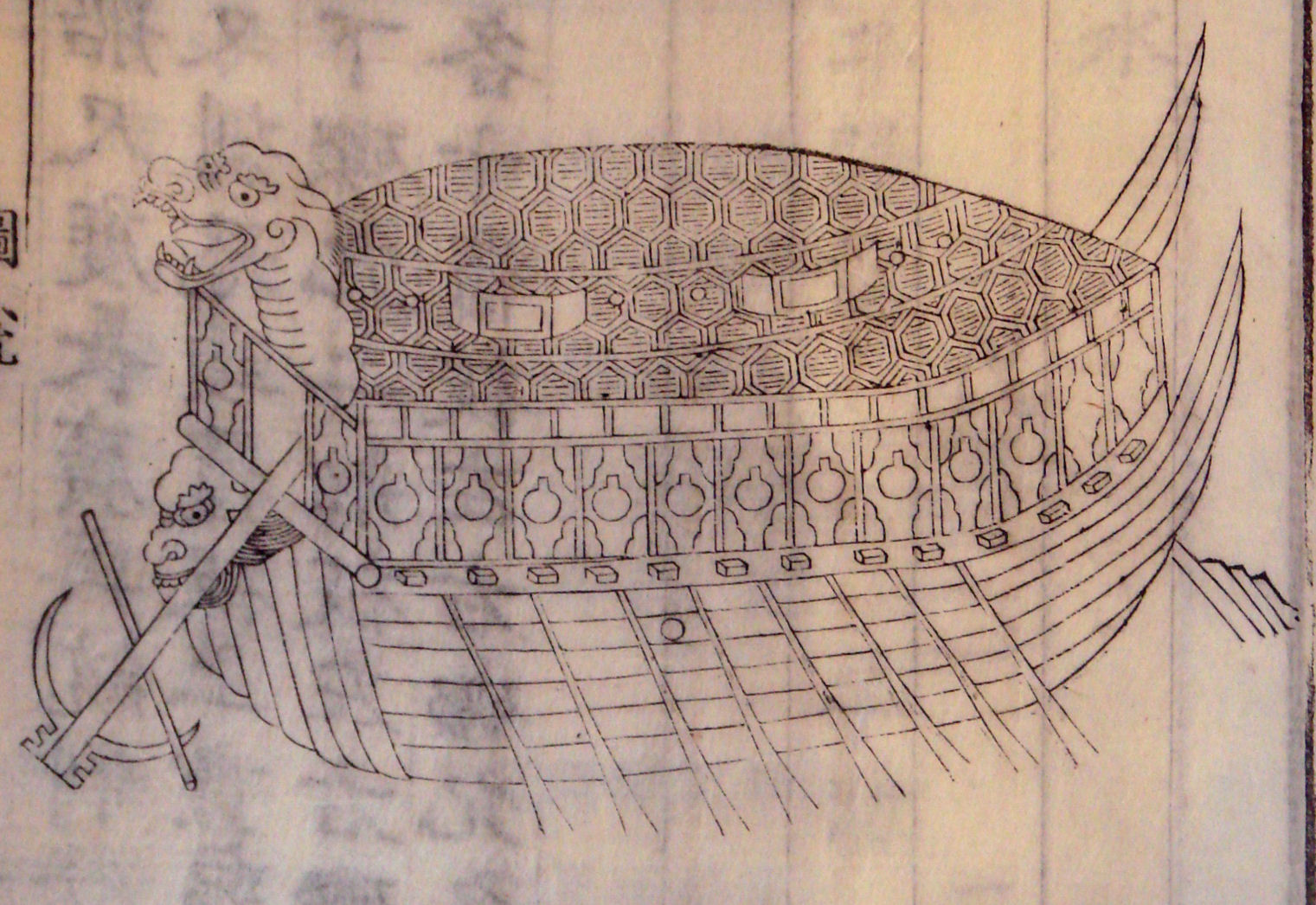
Illustration of turtle ship based on a ship that existed in 1795 and that was believed to be similar to the variants constructed in the 1590s.

=== Pre-industrial examples ===
Early ship armour probably had its origins in applying thin sheets of metal to ship undersides for preservative reasons. There are only a few exceptional examples of ships equipped with metal armor before Industrial Revolution. The Syracusia, built by Archimedes for Hiero II around 250 BC, featured an iron fortification against enemy boardings. Spanish admiral Juan de Lezcano also built a primitive ironclad vessel in 1505. The Santa Anna built by the Knights Hospitaller in 1522 was also reported to be an ironclad carrack. Also, the Galeone di Venezia from the Battle of Preveza might have been covered with iron plates. The Finis Belli was described as a possible candidate for "the first ironclad" by authors in the late 19th and early 20th century. The Finis Belli was a stationary floating fighting platform that was built by the Dutch during the Siege of Antwerp in 1585. It was supposedly equipped with iron plates but never actually saw action.

According to science historian Joseph Needham, thin metal sheets were used as protection on the superstructure on war junks during the Song dynasty (960–1279) and that this tradition was carried on in the Korean turtle ships that fought against Toyotomi Hideyoshi's invasion of the Korean peninsula in the 1590s. The use of iron plate armor on the turtle ships has been suggested in various sources from the 19th century onwards but is not attested in contemporary sources. Kuki Yoshitaka, a Japanese admiral of the same period, ordered the construction of ships armored with iron pavises called tekkōsen. Medieval Japanese vessels also used bundled bamboo taketaba to defend against bullets and small cannon shot.

=== First ironclads ===
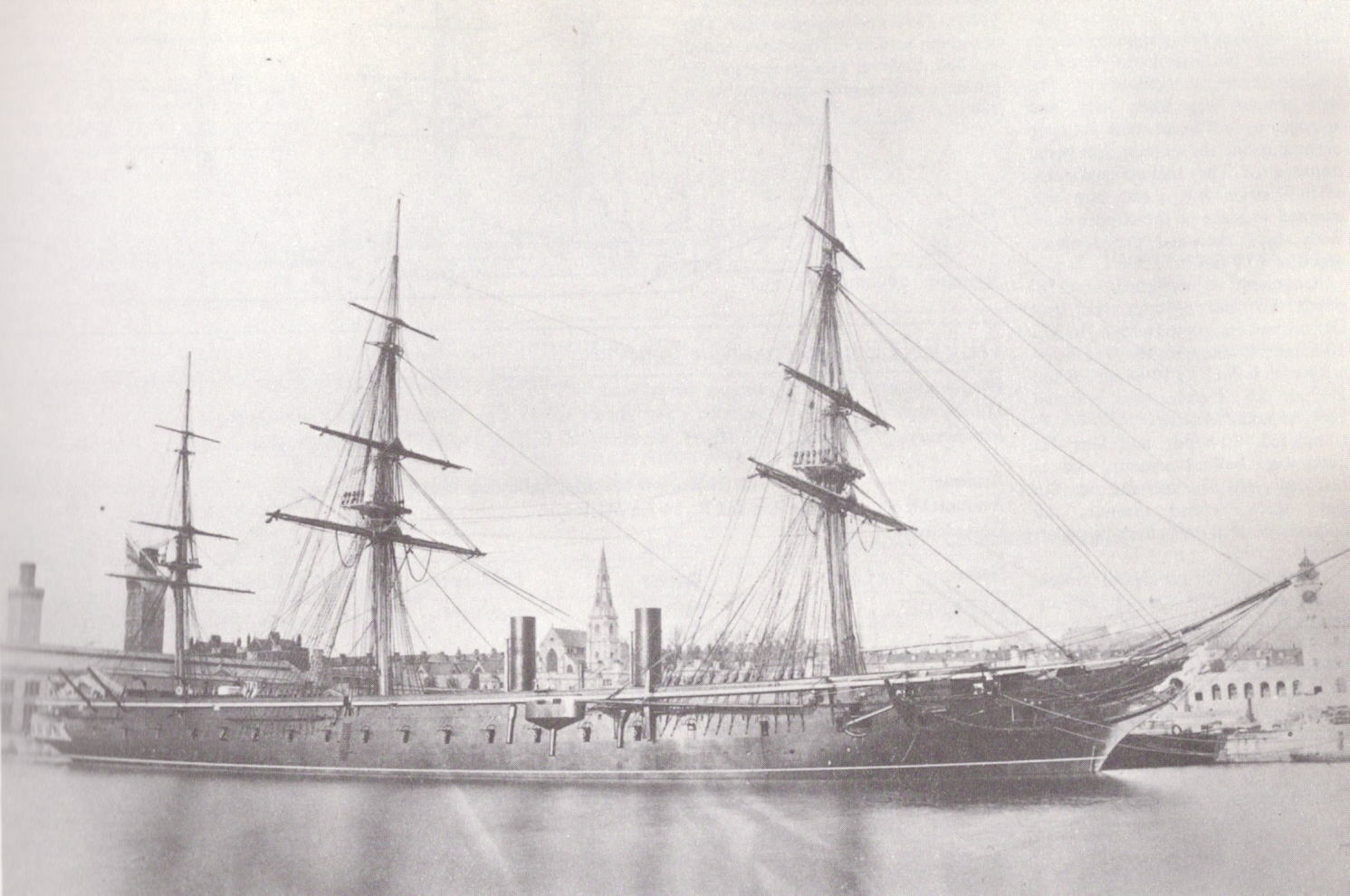
HMS Warrior during her third commission between 1867 and 1871

The first ironclad battleship, with iron armour over a wooden hull, La Gloire, was launched by the French Navy in 1859 prompting the British Royal Navy to build a counter. The following year they launched HMS Warrior, which was twice the size and had 4.5 inches of wrought iron armour (with 18 inches of teak wood backing) over an iron hull. After the first battle between two ironclads took place in 1862 during the American Civil War, it became clear that the ironclad had replaced the unarmoured line-of-battle ship as the most powerful warship afloat.

Ironclads were designed for several roles, including as high seas battleships, coastal defence ships, and long-range cruisers. The rapid evolution of warship design in the late 19th century transformed the ironclad from a wooden-hulled vessel which carried sails to supplement its steam engines into the steel-built, turreted battleships and cruisers familiar in the 20th century. This change was pushed forward by the development of heavier naval guns (the ironclads of the 1880s carried some of the heaviest guns ever mounted at sea), more sophisticated steam engines, and advances in metallurgy which made steel shipbuilding possible.

The rapid pace of change in the ironclad period meant that many ships were obsolete as soon as they were complete, and that naval tactics were in a state of flux. Many ironclads were built to make use of the ram or the torpedo, which a number of naval designers considered the crucial weapons of naval combat. There is no clear end to the ironclad period, but towards the end of the 1890s the term ironclad dropped out of use. New ships were increasingly constructed to a standard pattern and known as battleships, protected cruisers or armoured cruisers.

In turn the modern Dreadnought battleship appeared and alongside it the battlecruiser; the former protected by large amounts of armour which could protect it against all but guns of the largest calibre as found on other battleships, the latter carrying same size guns as a battleship but less armour in order to reach higher speeds.

=== Modern ===
The turn of the 20th century saw a development towards battleships, with large guns and copious armour. In previous eras, large caliber guns had been able to fire on the order of minutes, and were unwieldy to aim. But the development of powered aiming systems and ammunition hoists increased the rate of fire up to twice a minute, which combined with other developments, made battleships a finally useful force. The increasing calibers and muzzle velocity of guns required increasingly protective armor to stop projectiles. The development of new, more effective gunpowders also increased the length of guns, and the effective range of engagement. This meant that plunging fire became a serious concern, and lead to the strengthening of deck armor. Belt armor also became much thicker, surpassing 300 mm (12 in) on the largest battleships. One of the most heavily armored ships of all time, the Yamato-class battleship, had main belt of armour up to 410 millimetres (16.1 in) thick.

The development of the torpedo and effective naval mines required further considerations for underwater armor, which had not been given much thought in prior eras. The World War era also saw the emergence of the armoured cruiser, which traded some armor in exchange for speed as compared to a battleship.

Since World War II, naval armour has been less important, due to the development of anti-ship guided missiles. Missiles can be highly accurate and penetrate even the thickest of armor. As a result, modern warships now focus more on anti-missile technology, damage control, and survivability instead of armor. However, most modern warships retain 25 to 50 mm (0.98 to 1.97 in) of partial armor to protect missiles and aircraft from splinters and light weapons fire.

== Design ==
=== Belt armour ===
Belt armour is the main side armor on a warship.

Diagram of common elements of warship armor. The belt armor (A) is on the exterior, at the waterline. Also indicated is the main deck (B), the sloping deck armor (C), and the torpedo bulkhead (D).

=== Armoured citadel ===
An armoured citadel is an armoured box enclosing the machinery and magazine spaces, formed by the armoured deck, the waterline belt, and the transverse bulkheads.

=== Sloped armour ===
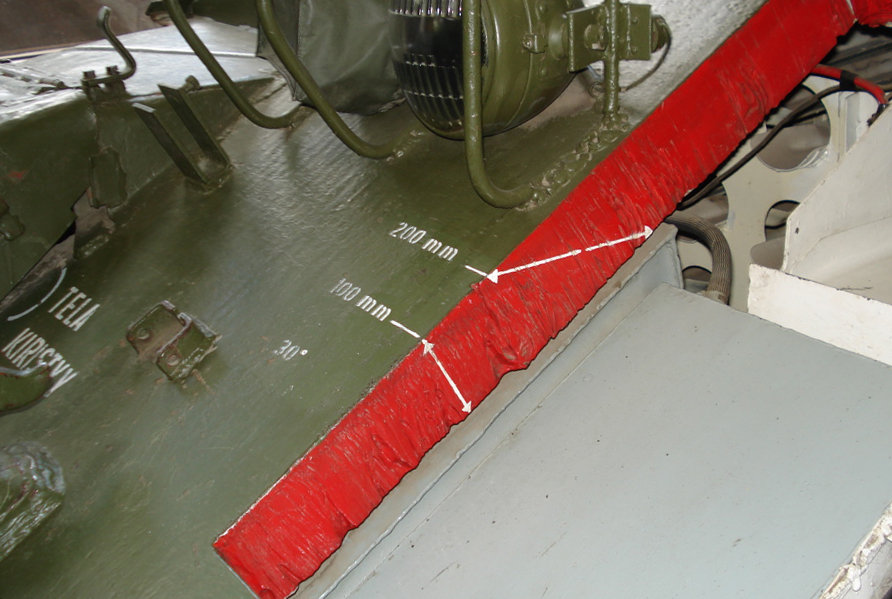
Sloped armour on the front of Soviet T-54 tank, here cut open to demonstrate the increase in effective thickness.

Simply sloping a piece of armour inherently increases its effectiveness by increasing the distance a projectile must travel to penetrate it. It also increases the odds that a projectile will ricochet off the target without causing damage.

=== Torpedo bulkhead ===
A torpedo bulkhead is common on the more heavily armoured warships, especially battleships and battlecruisers of the early 20th century. It is designed to keep the ship afloat even if the hull was struck underneath the belt armour by a shell or by a torpedo.

After the lessons learned during World War I, many capital ships were refitted with double, triple, or even quadruple torpedo bulkheads, as well as anti-torpedo bulges to the exterior of the hull. For example, the last US battleship designs during World War II had up to four torpedo bulkheads and a triple-bottom. The innermost bulkhead is commonly referred to as the holding bulkhead, and often this bulkhead would be manufactured from high tensile steel that could deform and absorb the pressure pulse from a torpedo hit without breaking. If the final bulkhead was at least 37 mm thick, it may also be referred to as an armoured bulkhead, as it would be capable of stopping splinters and shells with low striking velocities.

=== Torpedo belt ===
The torpedo belt was part of the armouring scheme in some warships between the 1920s and 1940s. It consisted of a series of lightly armoured compartments, extending laterally along a narrow belt that intersected the ship's waterline. In theory this belt would absorb the explosions from torpedoes, or any naval artillery shells that struck below the waterline, and thus minimize internal damage to the ship itself.

Torpedo belts are also known as Side Protection Systems or SPS, or Torpedo Defense System or TDS.

=== Torpedo bulge ===
Developed for use during the World Wars, an anti-torpedo bulge involves fitting (or retrofitting) partially water-filled compartmentalized sponsons on either side of a ship's hull, intended to detonate torpedoes, absorb their explosions, and contain flooding to damaged areas within the bulges.

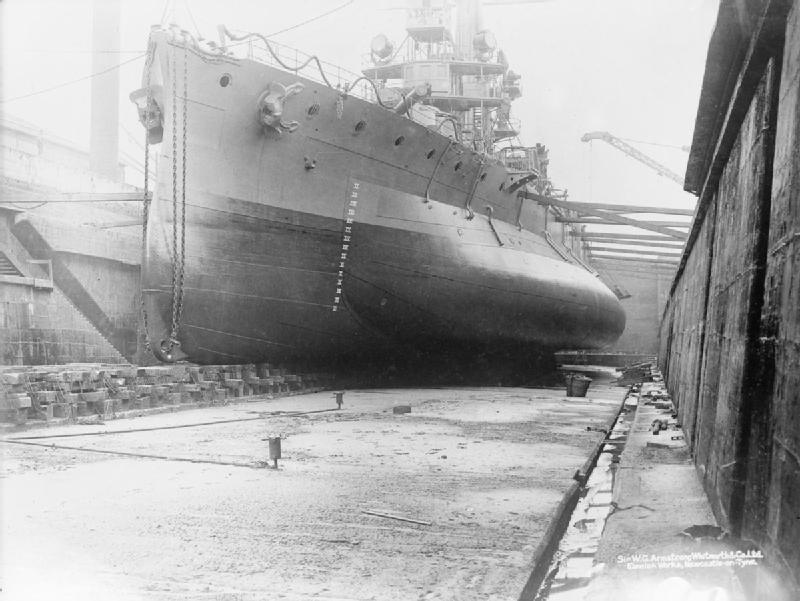
HMS Glatton in drydock, circa 1914–1918, showing its anti-torpedo bulge

=== All or nothing ===
All or nothing is a design choice in armouring warships, best known for its employment on Dreadnought battleships. The concept involves concentrating armour on areas most important to a ship while the rest of the ship receives significantly less armour. The "all or nothing" concept avoided light or moderate thicknesses of armour: armour was used in the greatest practicable thickness or not at all, thereby providing "either total or negligible protection". Compared to previous armouring systems, "all or nothing" ships had thicker armour covering a smaller proportion of the hull. The ironclad battleship HMS Inflexible launched in 1876 had featured a heavily armoured central citadel, with relatively unarmoured ends; however, by the era of HMS Dreadnought, battleships were armoured over the length of the ship with varying zones of heavy, moderate or light armour. The U.S. Navy adopted what was formally called "all or nothing" armour in the Standard-type battleships, starting with the Nevada class laid down in 1912. "All or nothing" armour was later adopted by other navies after the First World War, beginning with the Royal Navy in its Nelson class in combination with reducing the amount of ship that needed armouring by mounting all the main armament forward.

=== Armoured flight deck ===
The development of aircraft carriers necessitated new forms of protection. An armoured flight deck is an aircraft carrier flight deck that incorporates substantial armour in its design.

== Composition ==
=== Iron armour ===
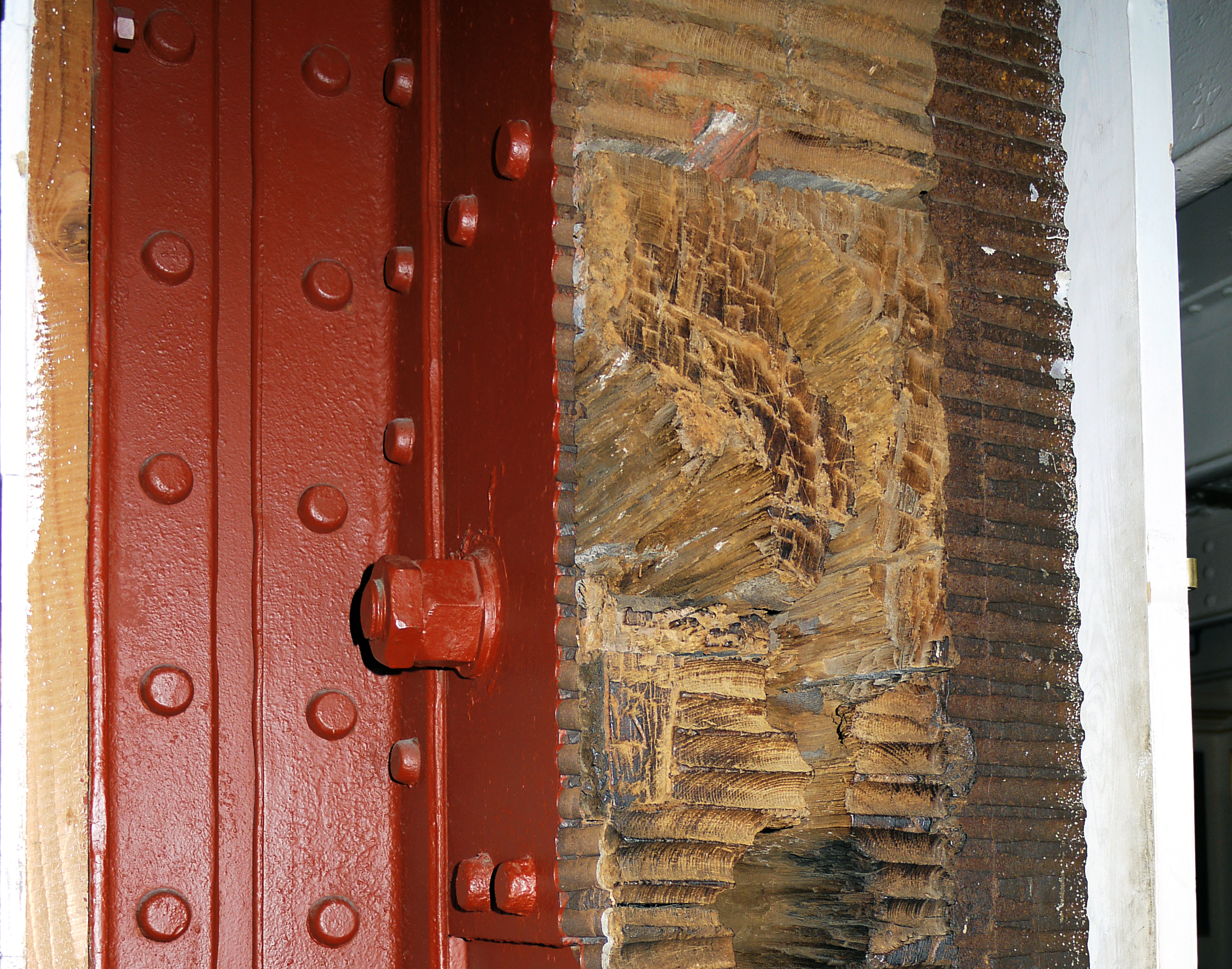
Cross section of HMS Warrior's bulkhead armour

Iron armour was a type of armour used on warships and, to a limited degree, fortifications. The use of iron gave rise to the term ironclad as a reference to a ship 'clad' in iron. The earliest material available in sufficient quantities for armouring ships was iron, wrought or cast. While cast iron has never been used for naval armour, it did find a use in land fortifications, presumable due to the lower cost of the material. One well known example of cast-iron armour for land use is the Gruson turret, first tested by the Prussian government in 1868. Armoured ships may have been built as early as 1203, in the Far East. In the West, they first become common when France launched the first ocean-going ironclad La Gloire in 1859. The British Navy responded with HMS Warrior in 1860, triggering a naval arms race with bigger, more heavily armed and armoured ironclads.

Early experiments showed that wrought iron was superior to cast iron, and wrought iron was subsequently adopted for naval use. British efforts at perfecting iron armour were headed by a government Special Committee on Iron, formed in 1861 by War Secretary Lord Herbert for the continued research into naval armour. Among its members was Sir William Fairbairn, a noted civil and structural engineer who had also built over 80 iron vessels before retiring from shipbuilding. Other members included metallurgist John Percy, civil engineer William Pole and representatives of the Royal Engineers, Royal Artillery and Royal Navy. This committee worked four years, between 1861 and 1865, during which time it formulated the best performing armour with the metallurgy as then known, suggested ways for improving its production and quality and helped develop more effective shot against ironclad vessels.

For instance, two processes were used in constructing iron armour. In the first, hammering, large lumps of iron of scrap or puddled iron were heated to welding temperature and placed under heavy steel hammers. Repeated blows welded these lumps into one solid plate and shaped it to the required form and dimensions. Hammered iron plate was the armour used in the earliest ironclad vessels, including HMS Warrior. The second method, rolling, involved stacking iron lumps atop one another, heating them to welding temperature and passing them between two iron rollers to become one plate of the required size. Rolled iron was difficult to produce initially, as it required machinery of immense size and great power. However, when the Special Committee tested both types of plate in 1863, it found that rolled iron was superior to hammered due to greater uniformity in quality. The committee and iron manufacturers worked together on how to more easily produce rolled plate, which became standard use in warships beginning in 1865.

The committee addressed the use of wooden backing with iron armour. Early European iron armour consisted of between four and five inches (roughly 10 to 13 cm) of wrought iron backed by between 18 and 36 inches (roughly one-half to one metre) of solid wood. After considerable testing, the committee found that wood prevented spalling, cushioned the shock of a hit from damaging the structure of the ship and distributed the force over a larger area, which prevented penetration. The drawback of using wood and iron was extreme weight. Experiments with reducing or eliminating wooden backing to save weight proved unsuccessful. The committee also tested steel as potential armour as its members felt that the harder the armour, the better it might deflect or resist shot. However, the steel being produced at that time proved too brittle to be effective. Iron, being softer, bent, dented and distorted but held together and remained an effective means of protection.

Experiments were also carried out with laminated armour, but these did not lead to any improvements and single plates were preferred. Many ships made during the American Civil War used laminated armour but this was necessitated by lack of facilities for manufacturing single plates of proper thickness.

Due to the ever increasing thickness of the armour, and the associated weight, proposals were made from an early date to faceharden the iron or weld steel plates to the front face of iron armour. Efforts to carry out these proposals failed for many reasons, primarily because the metallurgy at the time was not up to the task.

By the mid-to-late 1870s, iron armour started to give way to steel armour, which promised to reduce the thickness, and therefore the weight, of the armour.

=== Harvey armour ===
Harvey armor was a type of steel armor developed in the early 1890s in which the front surfaces of the plates were case hardened. The method for doing this was known as the Harvey process, and was invented by the American engineer Hayward Augustus Harvey. The Harvey United Steel Company was a steel cartel whose chairman was Albert Vickers. The year 1894 would see the ten main producers of armor plate, including Vickers, Armstrong, Krupp, Schneider, Carnegie and Bethlehem Steel, form the Harvey Syndicate.

=== Krupp armour ===
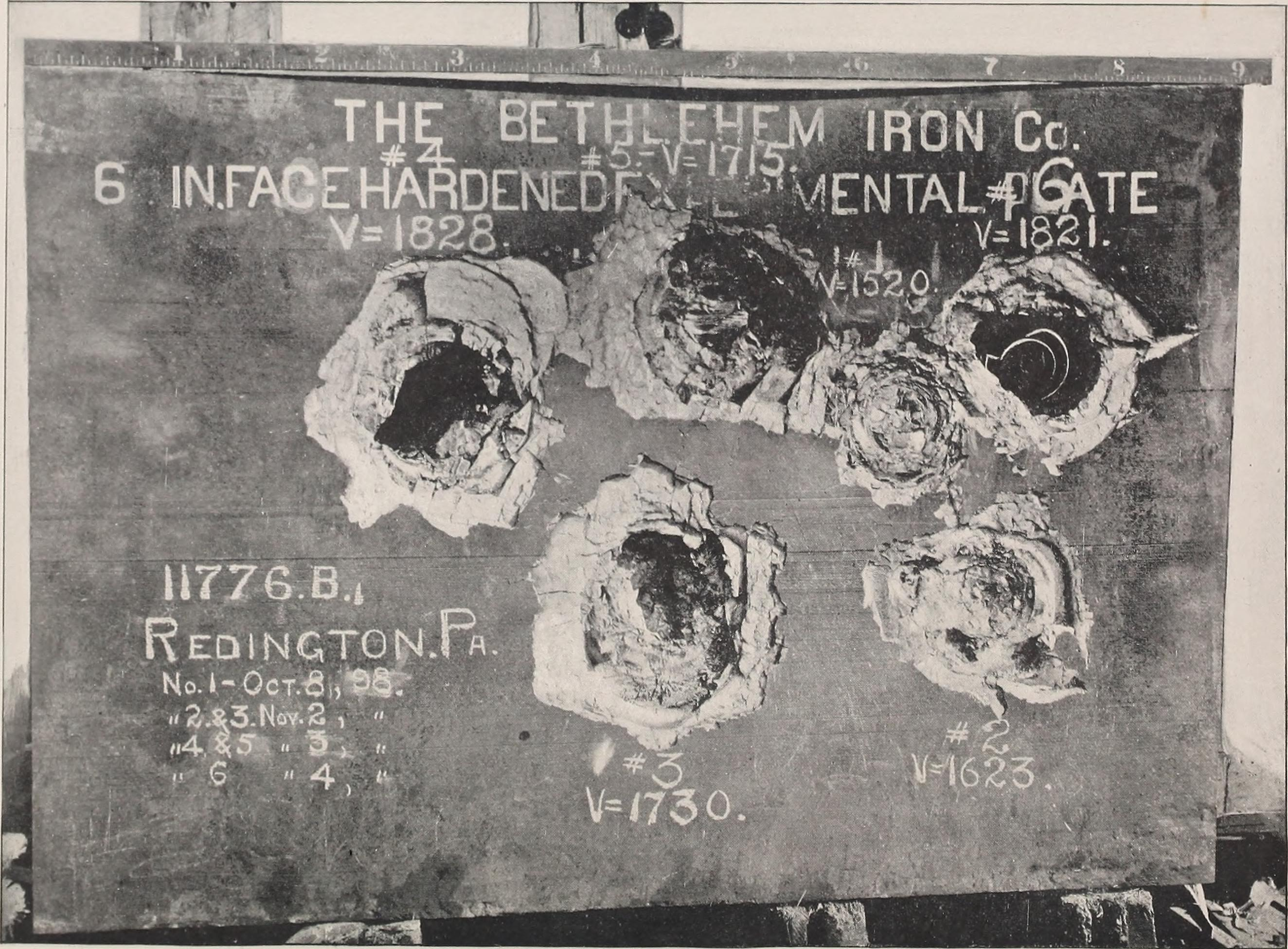
Experimental 6 inch (150 mm) Krupp armour plate from 1898

Krupp armour was a type of steel armour used in the construction of capital ships starting shortly before the end of the nineteenth century. It was developed by Germany's Krupp Arms Works in 1893 and quickly replaced Harvey armour as the primary method of protecting naval ships, before itself being supplanted by the improved "Krupp cemented armour". The initial manufacturing of Krupp armour was very similar to Harveyized armour; however, while the Harvey process generally used nickel-steel, the Krupp process added as much as 1% chromium to the alloy for additional hardness. Also, while Harveyized armour was carburized by heating the steel and placing charcoal on its surface for long periods (often several weeks), Krupp armour went a step further. Instead of inefficiently introducing carbon at the surface with coal, Krupp armour achieved greater depth of carbon cementation by applying carbon-bearing gases to the heated steel. Once the carburization process was complete, the metal was then transformed into face hardened steel by rapidly heating the cemented face, allowing the high heat to penetrate 30% to 40% of the steel's depth, then quickly quenching first the superheated side then both sides of the steel with powerful jets of either water or oil.

Krupp armour was swiftly adopted by the world's major navies; ballistic tests showed that 10.2 in (260 mm) of Krupp armour offered the same protection as 12 in (300 mm) of Harvey armour.

==== Krupp cemented armour ====
By the early twentieth century, Krupp armour was rendered obsolete by the development of Krupp cemented armour (also "Krupp cemented steel", "K.C. armour" or "KCA"), an evolved variant of Krupp armour. The manufacturing process remained largely the same, with slight changes in the alloy composition: in % of total – carbon 0.35, nickel 3.90, chromium 2.00, manganese 0.35, silicon 0.07, phosphorus 0.025, sulfur 0.020.

KCA retained the hardened face of Krupp armour via the application of carbonized gases but also retained a much greater fibrous elasticity on the rear of the plate. This increased elasticity greatly reduced the incidence of spalling and cracking under incoming fire, a valuable quality during long engagements. Ballistic testing shows that KCA and Krupp armour were roughly equal in other respects.

==== Homogeneous Krupp-type armour ====
Developments in face-hardened armour in the late nineteenth and early to mid-twentieth centuries revealed that such armour was less effective against glancing oblique impacts. The hardened face layer's brittleness was counterproductive against such impacts. Consequently, alongside face hardened armour such as KCA, homogeneous armour types that combined ductility and tensile strength were developed to protect against glancing impacts. Homogeneous armour was typically used for deck armour, which is subject to more high-obliquity impacts and, on some warships such as Yamato class and Iowa class battleships, for lower belt armour below the waterline to protect against shells that land short and dive underwater.

=== Ducol steel ===
Ducol or "D"-steel is the name of a number of high-strength low-alloy steels of varying composition, first developed from the early 1920s by the Scottish firm of David Colville & Sons, Motherwell.

Applications have included warship hull construction and light armouring, road bridges, and pressure vessels including locomotive steam boilers and nuclear reactors.

=== Ships ===
Ducol has been used for bulkheads in both general construction and against torpedoes, and for light armour in warships of several countries, including the British, Japanese and perhaps Italian navies. After WW2 the highest grades of the commercial shipbuilding steels were based on this type of steel.

==== Royal Navy ====
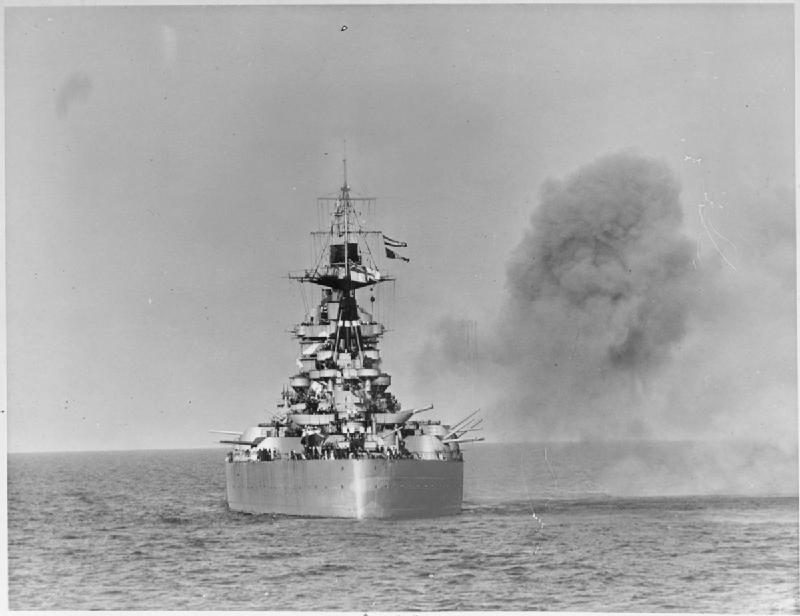
Rodney bombarding German positions off the Caen coast, 7 June 1944

Welded Ducol was used in HMS Nelson and HMS Rodney (1927), and may have contributed to initial structural damage when the big guns were fired. A solution was found by using rivets to attach the welded Ducol substructures to the hull rather than the original all-welded construction, allowing for some 'give'.

It was used in British anti-torpedo-system design practice in its last battleships. The internal hull and torpedo bulkheads and internal decks were made of Ducol or "D"-class steel, an extra-strong form of HTS. According to Nathan Okun, the King George V-class battleships had the simplest armour arrangement of all post-WWI capital ships. "Most of the load-bearing portions of the ship were constructed of British Ducol ("D" or "D.1") extra-high-strength silicon-manganese high-tensile construction steel, including the weather deck and the bulkheads."

HMS Ark Royal's fully-enclosed armoured hangar and the armoured flight deck which it supported were constructed of Ducol.

Other types of armour used on Navy ships:

- HTS = High-tensile steel
- STS = Special treatment steel = homogenous armour

==== Imperial Japanese Navy ====
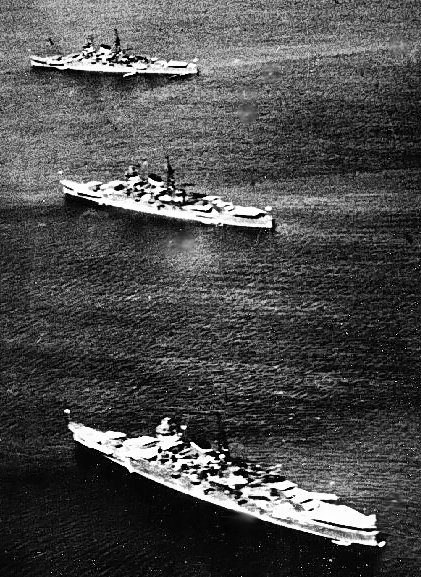
Three of the four Mogami-class cruisers of the Seventh Squadron

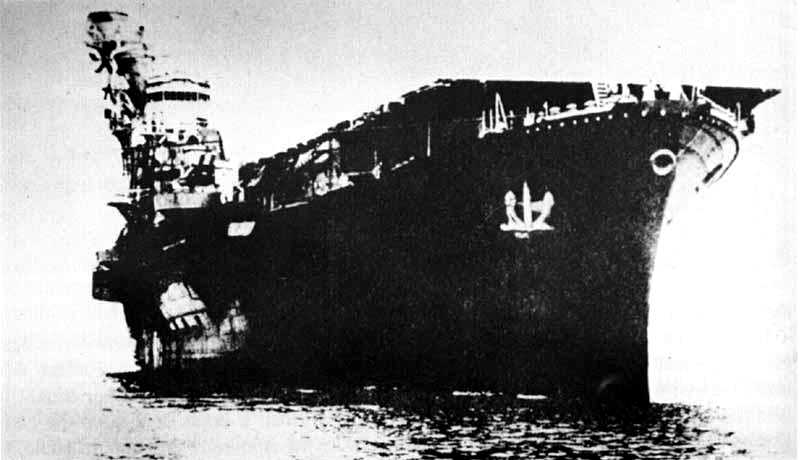
Hiyō at anchor

The Imperial Japanese Navy (IJN) made considerable use of Ducol made under licence by Japan Steel Works in Muroran, Hokkaidō, Japan: the company was set up with investment from Vickers, Armstrong Whitworth and Mitsui.

The Mogami-class cruisers were originally designed with all-welded Ducol bulkheads which were then welded to the ship's hull. The resultant faults caused by electric welding used in the structural portions of the hull resulted in deformation, and the main gun turrets were unable to train properly. They were re-built with riveted construction, and the other two were redesigned.

All of the following ships or classes (the list is not complete) used Ducol in structural bulkheads and protective plating:

- Japanese aircraft carrier Kaga (1928)
- Japanese cruiser Takao (Note: Japanese heavy cruiser Takao, along with Japanese battleship Nagato and the aircraft carrier Kaga and subsequent designs used torpedo bulges - inner curves formed by bulkheads made up of two 29mm plates providing 58mm of protetction. Also on Takao, Ducol was used on the conning tower (middle bridge deck). Torpedo warheads were also protected by a Ducol steel casing.)
- Mogami-class cruisers (x2, 1931), (x2 1933–34)
- Nagato-class battleships x2, (1920, upgraded 1934–36)
- Japanese aircraft carrier Shōkaku (1939) (Note: "As already noted, in comparison with the preceding Hiryu, Shōkaku's armour protection was considerably improved. 25mm Ducol Steel (DS) steel plates protected her magazines and 132mm New Vickers non-cemented (NVNC) deck. Belt armour consisted of 16mm NVNC plates.")

Lengerer differs considerably as to what was made of Ducol, perhaps because of the extensive refit in 1934–36? "The lower strake of the armour was backed by 50 millimeters (2.0 in) of Ducol steel. The magazines were protected by 165 millimeters (6.5 in) of New Vickers Non-Cemented (NVNC) armour, sloped at an inclination up to 25° and tapered to thicknesses of 55–75 millimeters (2.2–3.0 in). The flight and both hangar decks were unprotected and the ships' propulsion machinery was protected by a 65-millimeter (2.6 in) deck of CNC armour.

The Shōkakus were the first Japanese carriers to incorporate a torpedo belt system. The torpedo bulkhead itself consisted of an outer Ducol plate 18–30 millimeters (0.71–1.18 in) thick that was riveted to a 12-millimeter (0.47 in) plate."

- Japanese battleship Yamato (1940) (Note: The main portion of the central longitudinal structure was made with Ducol - rivetted, not welded, after problems with the Mogami-class cruisers. Also given 9mm deck plating.)
- Japanese battleship Musashi (1940)
- Japanese aircraft carrier Hiyō (1941)
- Japanese cruiser Oyodo (1941)
- Agano-class cruisers x4, (1941–44)
- Japanese aircraft carrier Shinano (1944)

In addition, the IJN's '25-ton' type river motor gun boat had an all-welded hull, protected by 4-5mm Ducol steel.

==== Italian Navy ====
The Italian Navy used a similar type of steel to Ducol in its Pugliese torpedo defence system. This underwater "bulge" system was introduced in the Italian Littorio-class battleships, and in the completely rebuilt versions of the Italian battleship Duilio and the Conte di Cavour-class battleships. The inboard-facing side was consisted of a layer of silicon-manganese high-tensile steel from 28–40 mm (1.1–1.6 in) thick called "Elevata Resistenza" (ER) steel, which was probably somewhat similar to the British Ducol ("D" or "Dl") Steel used for light armour and torpedo bulkheads in WWII.

"However, the power of the torpedoes used during WWII rapidly outclassed even the best bulge protection systems and the magnetic pistol, when finally perfected, allowed the torpedo to completely bypass the bulge by detonating under the keel of the ship."

=== Plastic armour ===
Plastic armour (also known as plastic protection) was a type of vehicle armour originally developed for merchant ships by Edward Terrell of the British Admiralty in 1940. It consisted of small, evenly sized aggregate in a matrix of bitumen, similar to asphalt concrete. It was typically applied as a casting in situ in a layer about two inches (51 mm) thick on to existing ship structures made from one-quarter-inch-thick (6.4 mm) mild steel or formed in equally thick sections on a one-half-inch-thick (13 mm) steel plate for mounting as gun shields and the like. Plastic armour replaced the use of concrete slabs which, although expected to provide protection, were prone to cracking and breaking up when struck by armour-piercing bullets. Plastic armour was effective because the very hard particles would deflect bullets which would then lodge between the plastic armour and the steel backing plate. Plastic armour could be applied by pouring it into a cavity formed by the steel backing plate and a temporary wooden form. Production of the armour was by road construction firms and was carried out in a similar way to the production of road coverings, the organization of the armouring being carried out by naval officers in key ports.

=== Electric armour ===
Electric armour is a type of armour proposed for the protection of ships and armoured fighting vehicles from shaped charge weapons. Electric armour uses a strong electric field to disrupt the jet of ionized gas produced by a warhead.

Electrically charged armour is a recent development in the United Kingdom by the Defence Science and Technology Laboratory. This functions by installing two conductive plates either side of an air gap or solid insulator with the plates attached to a capacitor holding a very high electrical charge, when a round or shell pierces the insulation and completes the circuit between the two plates the energy stored in the capacitor is discharged through the projectile vaporizing it.

== Notes ==
=== Bibliography ===
- Caruana, Joseph (Winter 1966). "Special Reprint". Warship International. 3 (1). International Naval Research Organization: 58. JSTOR 44886983.
- Jordan, John (2011). Warships after Washington: The Development of Five Major Fleets 1922-1930. Seaforth Publishing. p. 80. ISBN 978-1-84832-117-5.
- Lacroix, E. (1981). "Pre-war Modernization of the "A Class" Cruisers". Warship International. The Development of the "A Class" Cruisers in the Imperial Japanese Navy: Part V. 18 (4). International Naval Research Organization: 323–367. JSTOR 44890867.
- Lacroix, E. (1983). "Wartime Modifications, Activities and Final Fate of the "A Class" Cruisers". Warship International. The Development of the 'A Class' Cruisers in the Imperial Japanese Navy: Part VI. 20 (3). International Naval Research Organization: 232–282. JSTOR 44888424.
- Lacroix, E. (1984). "The "Mogami" "B Class" Cruisers modified to "A Class" standard, etc". Warship International. The Development of the "A Class" Cruisers in the Imperial Japanese Navy: Part VII. 21 (3). International Naval Research Organization: 246–305. JSTOR 44894563.
- Lengerer, Hans; Rehm-Takahara, Tomoko (1985). "The Japanese Aircraft Carriers Junyo and Hiyo". In Andrew, Lambert (ed.). Warship IX. London: Conway Maritime Press. ISBN 978-0-85177-403-9.
- Lengerer, Hans (2015). "The Aircraft Carriers of the Shōkaku Class". In Jordan, John (ed.). Warship 2015. London: Conway. ISBN 978-1-84486-276-4.
- Lengerer, Hans (2018). "The IJN Light cruiser Oyodo". In Jordan, John (ed.). Warship 2018. Osprey. ISBN 978-1-4728-3001-2.
- Skulski, Janusz (2004). The heavy cruiser Takao. Anova Books. ISBN 978-0-85177-974-4.
- Skulski, Janusz (2017). Battleships Yamato and Musashi. Illustrated by Stefan Draminski. Bloomsbury Publishing. ISBN 978-1-84486-317-4.
