= Vehicle armour =

Plating used to fortify against damage

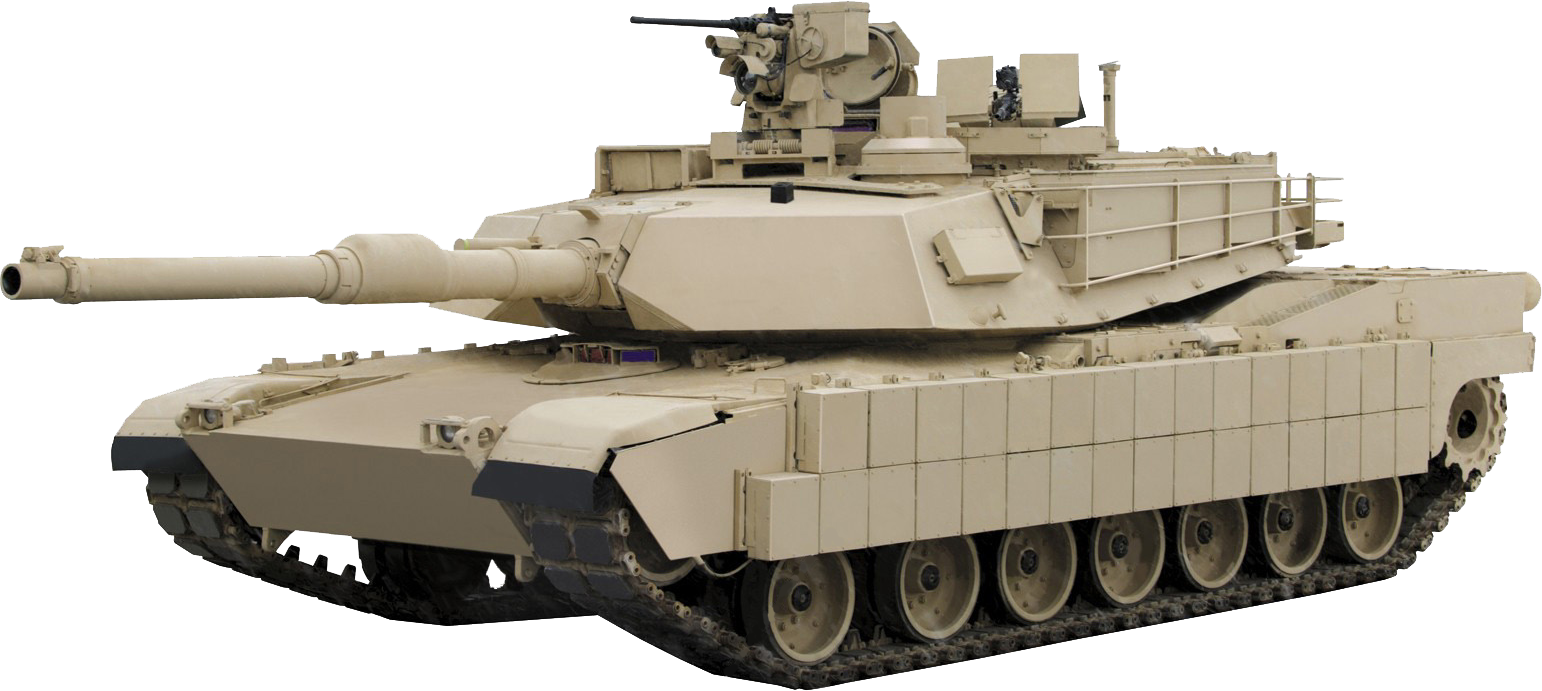
The U.S. Army's M1 Abrams MBT with TUSK (Tank Urban Survival Kit) upgrade uses composite, reactive and slat armour

Military vehicles are commonly armoured to withstand the impact of shrapnel, bullets, shells, rockets, and missiles, protecting the personnel inside from enemy fire. Such vehicles include armoured fighting vehicles like tanks, aircraft, and ships.

Civilian vehicles may also be armoured. These vehicles include cars used by officials (e.g., presidential limousines), reporters and others in conflict zones or where violent crime is common. Civilian armoured cars are also routinely used by security firms to carry money or valuables to reduce the risk of highway robbery or the hijacking of the cargo.

Armour may also be used in vehicles to protect from threats other than a deliberate attack. Some spacecraft are equipped with specialised armour to protect them against impacts from micrometeoroids or fragments of space debris. Modern aircraft powered by jet engines usually have them fitted with a sort of armour in the form of an aramid composite kevlar bandage around the fan casing or debris containment walls built into the casing of their gas turbine engines to prevent injuries or airframe damage should the fan, compressor, or turbine blades break free.

The design and purpose of the vehicle determines the amount of armour plating carried, as the plating is often very heavy and excessive amounts of armour restrict mobility. In order to decrease this problem, some new materials (nanomaterials) and material compositions are being researched which include buckypaper, and aluminium foam armour plates.

== Materials ==
=== Metals ===
==== Steel ====
Rolled homogeneous armour is strong, hard and tough (does not shatter when struck with a fast, hard blow). Steel with these characteristics is produced by processing cast steel billets of appropriate size and then rolling them into plates of required thickness. Rolling and forging (hammering the steel when it is red hot) irons out the grain structure in the steel, removing imperfections which would reduce the strength of the steel. Rolling also elongates the grain structure in the steel to form long lines, which enables the stress the steel is placed under when loaded to flow throughout the metal, and not be concentrated in one area.

Cast homogenous armour or cast steel armour is produced by directly casting steel into the desired shape. It tends to be softer as heat treatment is difficult or impossible. Nevertheless, the flexibility in shape has made it popular as the structural hull in modern tanks.

==== Aluminium ====
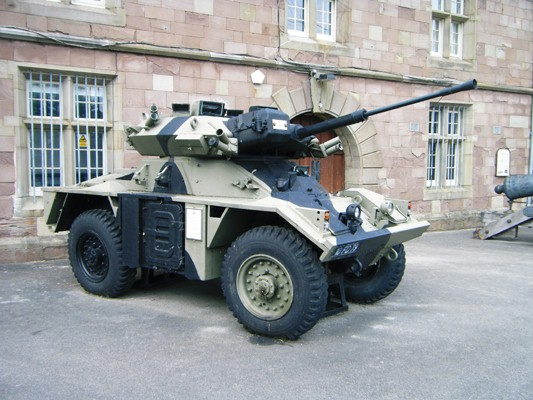
The British Fox CVR(W) was built largely of aluminium.

Aluminium is used when light weight is a necessity. It is most commonly used on APCs and armoured cars. While certainly not the strongest metal, it is cheap, lightweight, and tough enough that it can serve as easy armour.

==== Iron ====
Wrought iron was used on ironclad warships. Early European iron armour consisted of 10 to 12.5 cm of wrought iron backed by up to one metre of solid wood. It has since been replaced by steel due to steel being significantly stronger.

==== Titanium ====
Titanium has almost twice the density of aluminium, but can have a yield strength similar to high strength steels, giving it a high specific strength. It also has a high specific resilience and specific toughness. So, despite being more expensive, it finds an application in areas where weight is a concern, such as personal armour and military aviation. Some notable examples of its use include the USAF A-10 Thunderbolt II and the Soviet/Russian-built Sukhoi Su-25 ground-attack aircraft, utilising a bathtub-shaped titanium enclosure for the pilot, as well as the Soviet/Russian Mil Mi-24 attack helicopter.

==== Uranium ====
Because of its high density, depleted uranium (DU) can also be used in tank armour, sandwiched between sheets of steel armour plate. For instance, some late-production M1A1HA and M1A2 Abrams tanks built after 1998 have DU reinforcement as part of the armour plating in the front of the hull and the front of the turret, and there is a program to upgrade the rest (see Chobham armour).

=== Plastic ===
Plastic metal was a type of vehicle armour originally developed for merchant ships by the British Admiralty in 1940. The original composition was described as 50% clean granite of half-inch size, 43% of limestone mineral, and 7% of bitumen. It was typically applied in a layer two inches thick and backed by half an inch of steel.

Plastic armour was highly effective at stopping armour piercing bullets because the hard granite particles would deflect the bullet, which would then lodge between plastic armour and the steel backing plate. Plastic armour could be applied by pouring it into a cavity formed by the steel backing plate and a temporary wooden form.

Some main battle tank armour utilises polymers, for example polyurethane as used in the "BDD" appliqué armour applied to modernized T-62 and T-55.

=== Glass ===
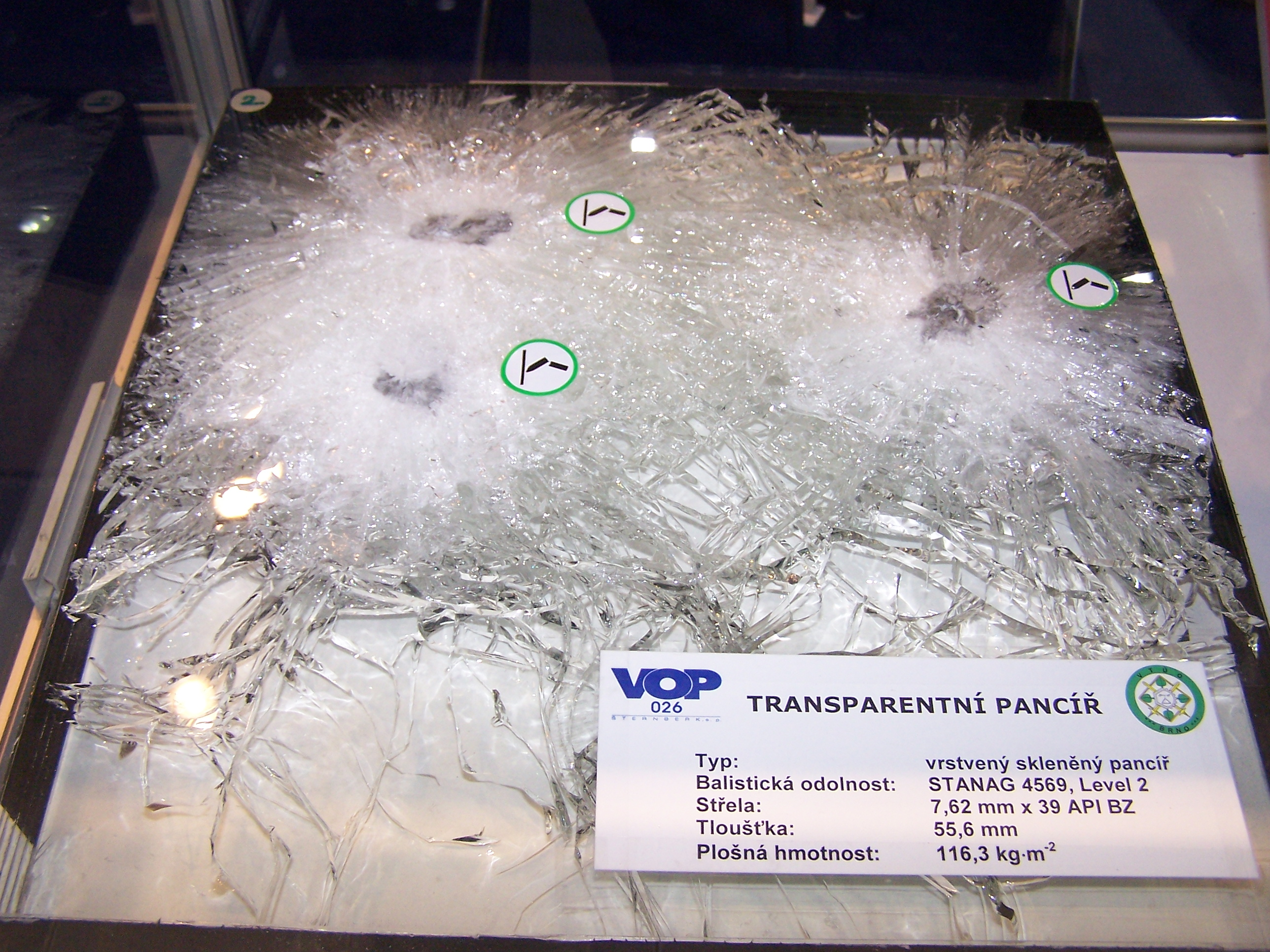
Ballistic test of a bullet-resistant glass panel

Bullet-resistant glass is a colloquial term for glass that is particularly resistant to being penetrated when struck by bullets. The industry generally refers to it as bulletproof glass or transparent armour.

Bullet-resistant glass is usually constructed using a strong but transparent material such as polycarbonate thermoplastic or by using layers of laminated glass. The desired result is a material with the appearance and light-transmitting behaviour of standard glass, which offers varying degrees of protection from small arms fire.

The polycarbonate layer, usually consisting of products such as Armormax, Makroclear, Cyrolon, Lexan or Tuffak, is often sandwiched between layers of regular glass. The use of plastic in the laminate provides impact-resistance, such as physical assault with a hammer, an axe, etc. The plastic provides little in the way of bullet-resistance. The glass, which is much harder than plastic, flattens the bullet and thereby prevents penetration. This type of bullet-resistant glass is usually 70–75 mm (2.8–3.0 in) thick.

Bullet-resistant glass constructed of laminated glass layers is built from glass sheets bonded together with polyvinyl butyral, polyurethane or ethylene-vinyl acetate. This type of bullet-resistant glass has been in regular use on combat vehicles since World War II; it is typically about 100–120 mm (3.9–4.7 in) thick and is usually extremely heavy.

Newer materials are being developed. One such, aluminium oxynitride, is much lighter but at US$10–15 per square inch is much more costly.

=== Ceramic ===
Ceramic's precise mechanism for defeating HEAT was uncovered in the 1980s. High speed photography showed that the ceramic material shatters as the HEAT round penetrates, the highly energetic fragments destroying the geometry of the metal jet generated by the hollow charge, greatly diminishing the penetration. Ceramic layers can also be used as part of composite armour solutions. The high hardness of some ceramic materials serves as a disruptor that shatters and spreads the kinetic energy of projectiles.

=== Composite ===
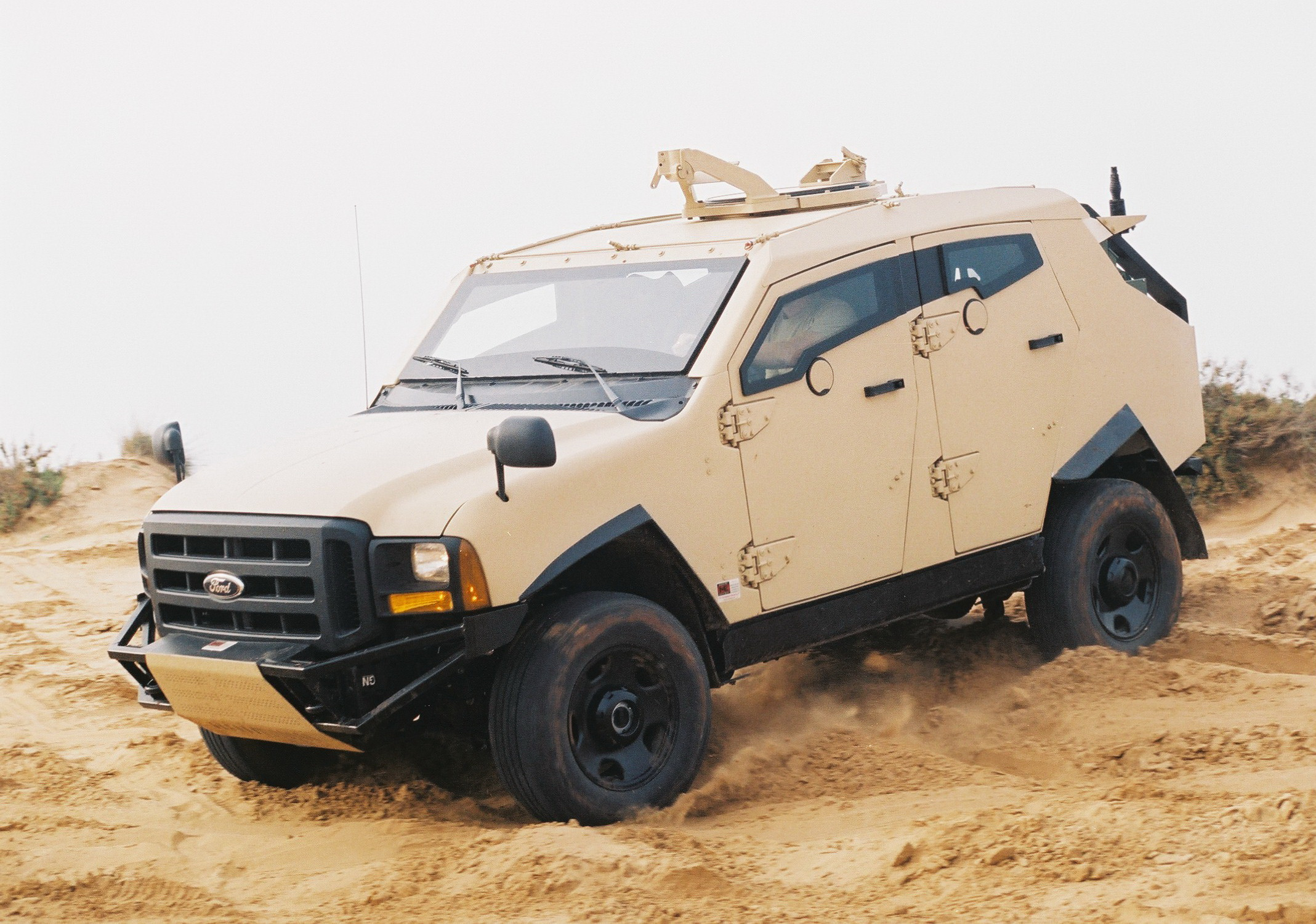
Plasan Sand Cat light (5 ton) military vehicle featuring integrated composite armoured body

Composite armour is armour consisting of layers of two or more materials with significantly different physical properties; steel and ceramics are the most common types of material in composite armour. Composite armour was initially developed in the 1940s, although it did not enter service until much later and the early examples are often ignored in the face of newer armour such as Chobham armour. Composite armour's effectiveness depends on its composition and may be effective against kinetic energy penetrators as well as shaped charge munitions; heavy metals are sometimes included specifically for protection from kinetic energy penetrators.

Composite armour used on modern Western and Israeli main battle tanks largely consists of non-explosive reactive armour (NERA) elements - a type of reactive armour. These elements are often a laminate consisting of two hard plates (usually high hardness steel) with some low density interlayer material between them. Upon impact, the interlayer swells and moves the plates, disrupting heat 'jets' and possibly degrading kinetic energy projectiles. Behind these elements will be some backing element designed to stop the degraded jet or projectile element, which may be of high hardness steel, or some composite of steel and ceramic or possibly uranium.

Soviet main battle tanks from the T-64 onward utilised composite armour which often consisted of some low density filler between relatively thick steel plates or castings, for example Combination K. For example, the T-64 turret had a layer of ceramic balls and aluminium sandwiched between layers of cast steel armour, whilst some models of the T-72 features a glass filler called "Kvartz". The tank glacis was often a sandwich of steel and some low density filler, either textolite (a fibreglass reinforced polymer) or ceramic plates. Later T-80 and T-72 turrets contained NERA elements, similar to those discussed above.

== Ships ==
Diagram of common elements of warship armour. The belt armour is denoted by "A".

Belt armour is a layer of armour-plating outside the hull of warships, typically on battleships, battlecruisers, cruisers and some aircraft carriers.

Typically, the belt covers from the deck down some way below the waterline of the ship. If built within the hull, rather than forming the outer hull, it can be fitted at an inclined angle to improve the protection.

When struck by a shell or torpedo, the belt armour is designed to prevent penetration, by either being too thick for the warhead to penetrate, or sloped to a degree that would deflect either projectile. Often, the main belt armour was supplemented with a torpedo bulkhead spaced several metres behind the main belt, designed to maintain the ship's watertight integrity even if the main belt were penetrated.

The air-space between the belt and the hull also adds buoyancy. Several wartime vessels had belt armour that was thinner or shallower than was desirable, to speed production and conserve resources.

Deck armour on aircraft carriers is usually at the flight deck level, but on some early carriers was at the hangar deck. (See armoured flight deck.)

== Aircraft ==
Only the vital parts of an aircraft, such as the ejection seat and engines, are usually armoured. In the American Fairchild Republic A-10 Thunderbolt II and the Soviet-built Sukhoi Su-25 ground attack aircraft, as well as the Mil Mi-24 Hind ground-attack helicopter, the pilot sits in a titanium enclosure known as the "bathtub" for its shape.

Windscreens of larger aircraft, including civilian craft, are generally made of impact-resistant, laminated materials, to prevent damage from bird strikes or debris.

== Armoured fighting vehicles ==
The most heavily armoured vehicles today are the main battle tanks, which are the spearhead of the ground forces, and are designed to withstand anti-tank guided missiles, kinetic energy penetrators, high-explosive anti-tank weapons, NBC threats and in some tanks even steep-trajectory shells. The Israeli Merkava tanks were designed in a way that each tank component functions as added back-up armour to protect the crew. Outer armour is modular and enables quickly replacing damaged parts.

=== Layout ===
For efficiency, the heaviest armour on an armoured fighting vehicle (AFV) is placed on its front. Tank tactics require the vehicle to always face the likely direction of enemy fire as much as possible, even in defence or withdrawal operations.

Sloping and curving armour can both increase its protection. Given a fixed thickness of armour plate, a projectile striking at an angle must penetrate more armour than one impacting perpendicularly. An angled surface also increases the chance of deflecting a projectile. This can be seen on v-hull designs, which direct the force of an improvised explosive device or landmine away from the crew compartment, increasing crew survivability.

=== Spall liners ===
Beginning during the Cold War, many AFVs have spall liners inside of the armour, designed to protect crew and equipment inside from fragmentation (spalling) released from the impact of enemy shells, especially high-explosive squash head warheads. Spall liners are made of aramids (Kevlar, Twaron), UHMWPE (Dyneema, Spectra Shield), or similar materials.

=== Appliqué ===
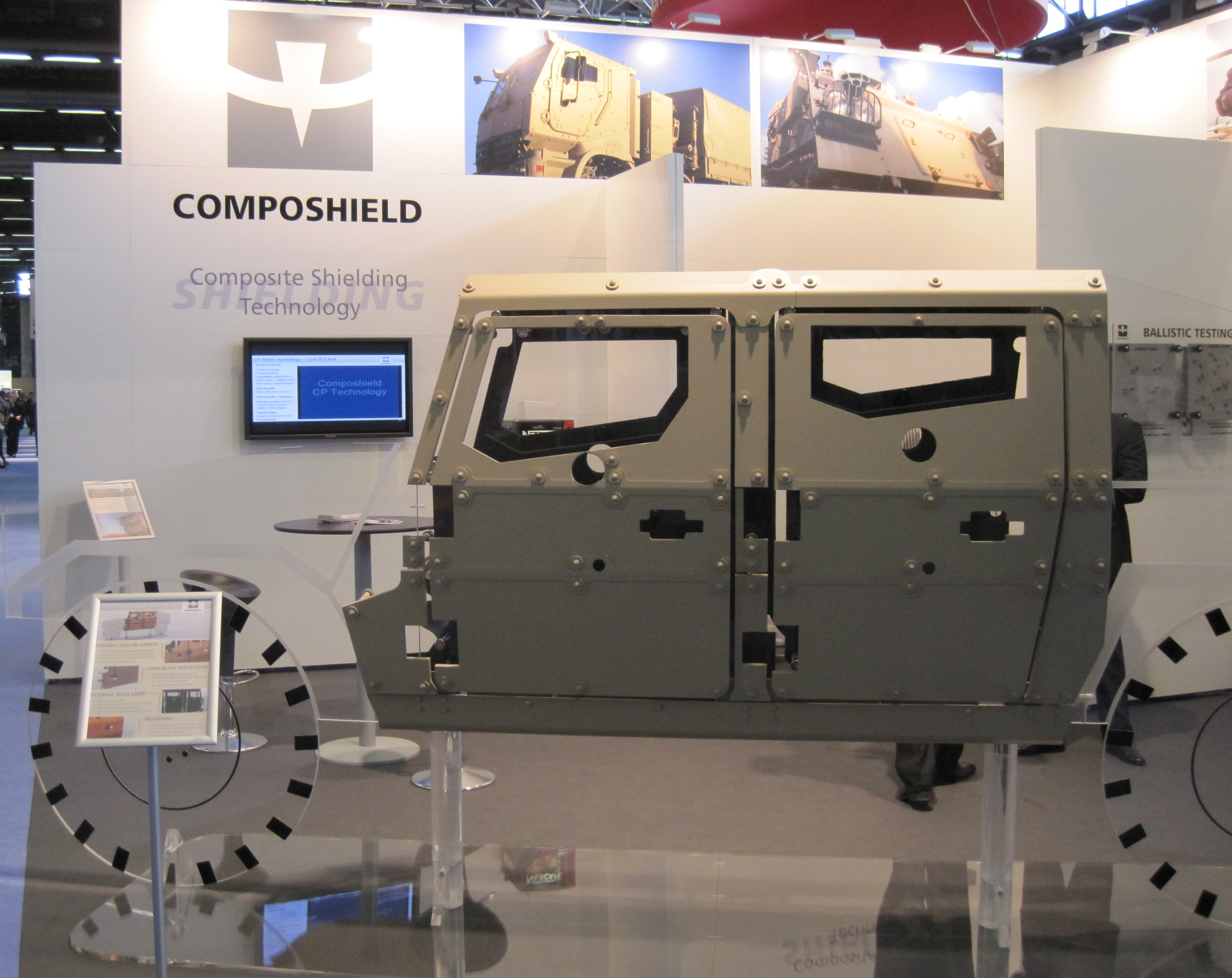
Vehicle composite add-on armour kit

Appliqué armour, or add-on armour, consists of extra plates mounted onto the hull or turret of an AFV. The plates can be made of any material and are designed to be retrofitted to an AFV to withstand weapons that can penetrate the original armour of the vehicle. An advantage of appliqué armour is the possibility to tailor a vehicle's protection level to a specific threat scenario.

=== Improvised ===
Vehicle armour is sometimes improvised in the midst of an armed conflict by vehicle crews or individual units. In World War II, British, Canadian and Polish tank crews welded spare strips of tank track to the hulls of their Sherman tanks. U.S. tank crews often added sand bags in the hull and turrets on Sherman tanks, often in an elaborate cage made of girders. Some Sherman tanks were up-armoured in the field with glacis plates and other armour cut from knocked-out tanks to create Improvised Jumbos, named after the heavily armoured M4A3E2 assault tank. In the Vietnam War, U.S. "gun trucks" were armoured with sandbags and locally fabricated steel armour plate. More recently, U.S. troops in Iraq armoured Humvees and various military transport vehicles with scrap materials: this came to be known as "hillbilly armour" or "haji armour" by the Americans. Moreover, there was the Killdozer incident, with the modified bulldozer being armoured with steel and concrete composite, which proved to be highly resistant to small arms.

=== Spaced ===
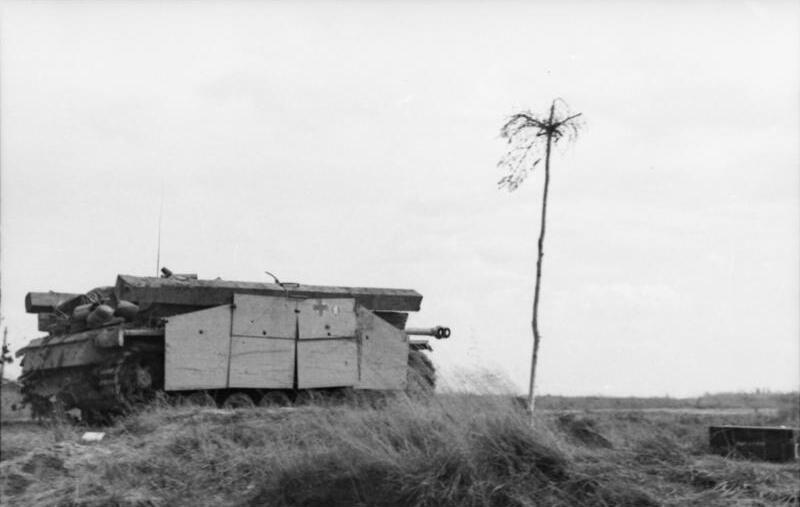
Sturmgeschütz III with spaced armour plates

Armour with two or more plates spaced a distance apart, called spaced armour, has been in use since the First World War, where it was used on the Schneider CA1 and Saint-Chamond tanks. Spaced armour can be advantageous in several situations. For example, it can reduce the effectiveness of kinetic energy penetrators because the interaction with each plate can cause the round to tumble, deflect, deform, or disintegrate. This effect can be enhanced when the armour is sloped. Spaced armour can also offer increased protection against HEAT projectiles. This occurs because the shaped charge warhead can detonate prematurely (at the first surface), so that the metal jet that is produced loses its coherence before reaching the main armour and impacting over a broader area. Sometimes the interior surfaces of these hollow cavities are sloped, presenting angles to the anticipated path of the shaped charge's jet in order to further dissipate its power. Taken to the extreme, relatively thin armour plates, metal mesh, or slatted plates, much lighter than fully protective armour, can be attached as side skirts or turret skirts to provide additional protection against such weapons. This can be seen in middle and late-World War II German tanks, as well as many modern AFVs. Taken as a whole, spaced armour can provide significantly increased protection while saving weight.

The analogous Whipple shield uses the principle of spaced armour to protect spacecraft from the impacts of very fast micrometeoroids. The impact with the first wall melts or breaks up the incoming particle, causing fragments to be spread over a wider area when striking the subsequent walls.

=== Sloped ===
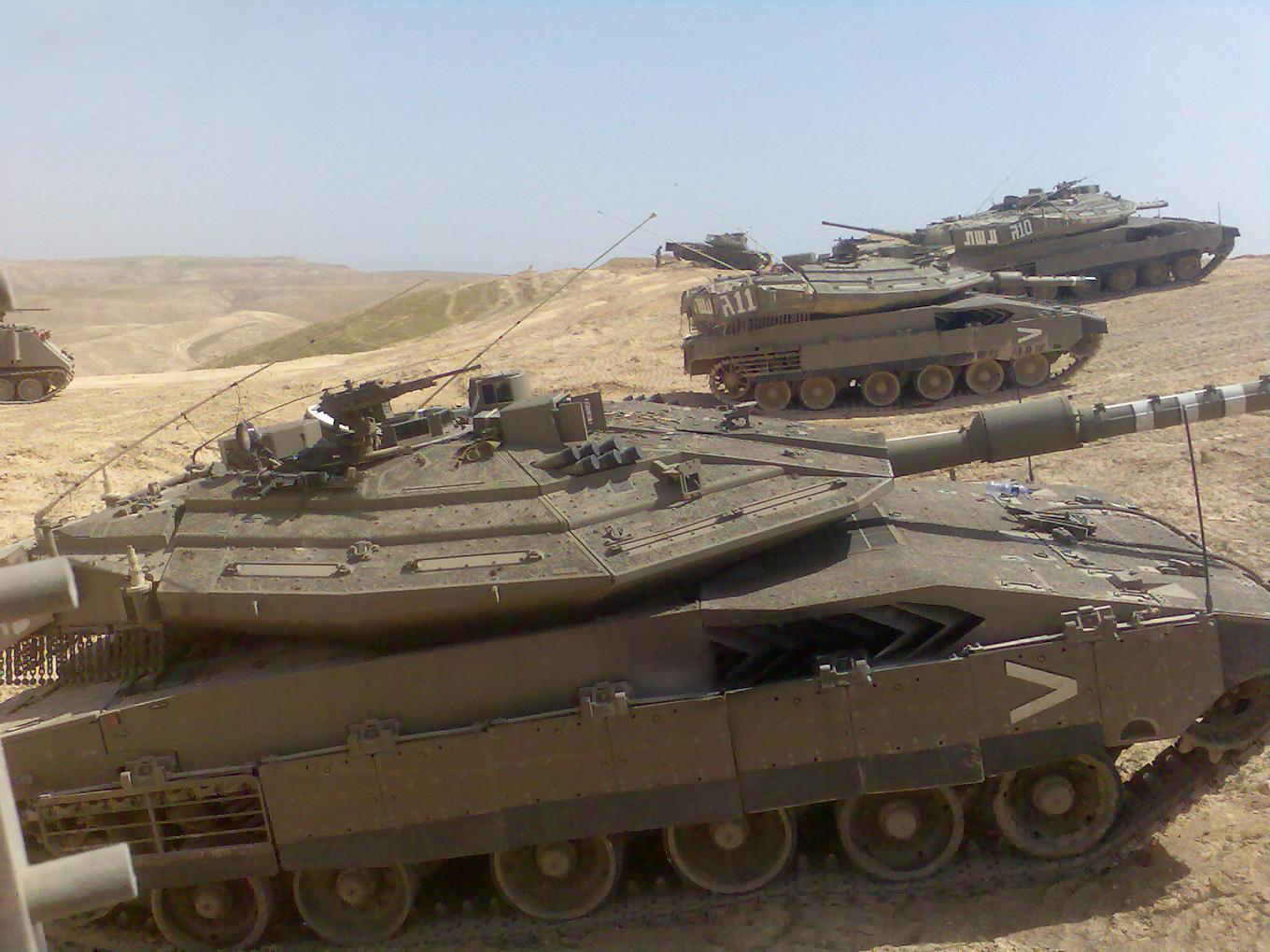
The Merkava features extreme sloped armour on the turret

Sloped armour is armour that is mounted at a non-vertical and non-horizontal angle, typically on tanks and other armoured fighting vehicles. For a given normal to the surface of the armour, its plate thickness, increasing armour slope improves the armour's level of protection by increasing the thickness measured on a horizontal plane, while for a given area density of the armour the protection can be either increased or reduced by other sloping effects, depending on the armour materials used and the qualities of the projectile hitting it. The increased protection caused by increasing the slope while keeping the plate thickness constant, is due to a proportional increase of area density and thus mass, and thus offers no weight benefit. Therefore, the other possible effects of sloping, such as deflection, deforming and ricochet of a projectile, have been the reasons to apply sloped armour in armoured vehicles design. Another motive is the fact that sloping armour is a more efficient way of covering the necessary equipment since it encloses less volume with less material. The sharpest angles are usually seen on the frontal glacis plate, both as it is the hull side most likely to be hit and because there is more room to slope in the longitudinal direction of a vehicle.

=== Reactive ===
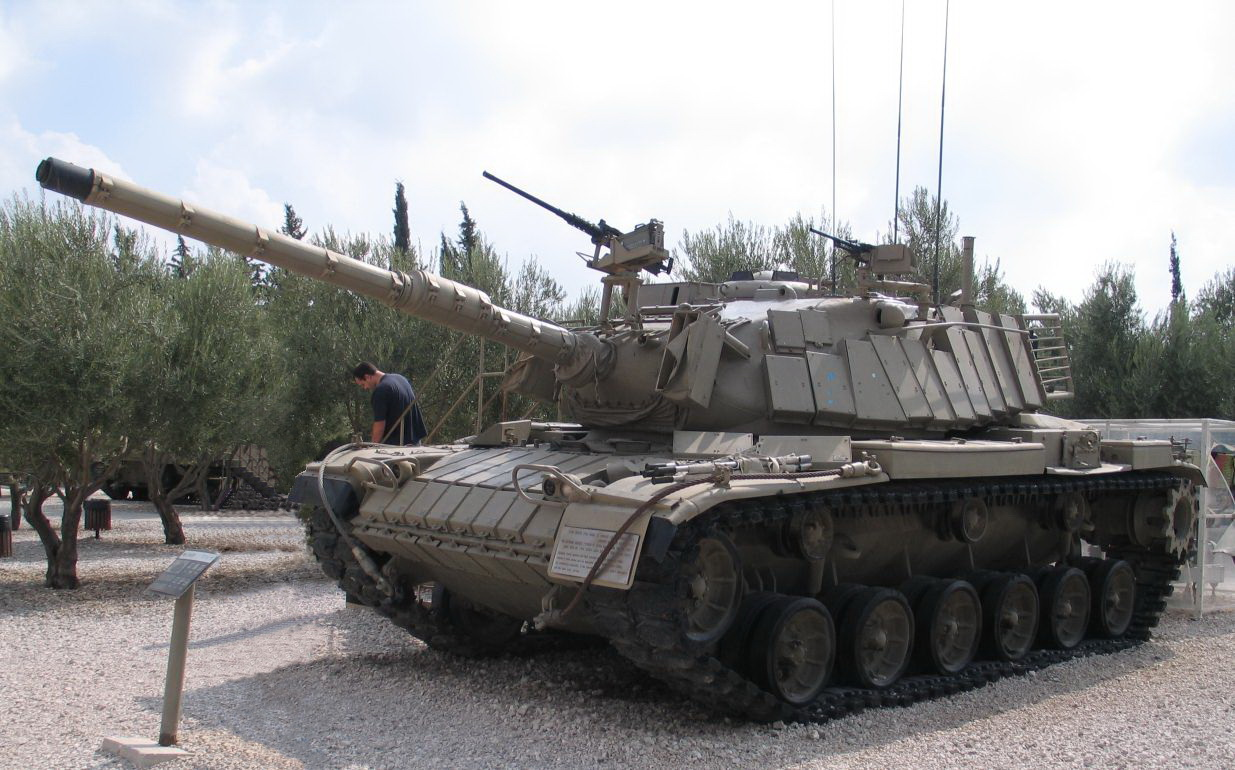
M60A1 Patton tank with Israeli Blazer ERA

Explosive reactive armour, initially developed by German researcher Manfred Held while working in Israel, uses layers of high explosive sandwiched between steel plates. When a shaped-charge warhead hits, the explosive detonates and pushes the steel plates into the warhead, disrupting the flow of the charge's liquid metal penetrator (usually copper at around 500 degrees Celsius; it can be made to flow like water by sufficient pressure). Traditional "light" ERA is less effective against kinetic penetrators. "Heavy" reactive armour, however, offers better protection. Such armor systems are predominantly found on Russian or Chinese MBTs; examples include the widely used Russian ERA Kontakt-5, and its later derivatives such as "Relikt" and "Monolith". Chinese ERA systems are largely similar in design principle; examples include FY-4 and FY-5. Explosive reactive armour poses a threat to friendly troops near the vehicle due to the shrapnel created from the flyer plate and destroyed projectile.

Non-explosive reactive armour is a similar armour concept to ERA which uses materials which deform and expand upon being hit to disrupt chemical munition jets and deflect kinetic penetrators. Such examples are widely used on NATO style MBTs; examples include the M1 Abrams series utilizing stacked spaced arrays of flexible armor plates and the French Leclerc, which uses NERA as the basis of its protection systems. An advantage of NERA over ERA is that it is capable of protecting against multiple hits to the same area, does not endanger nearby infantry, is simpler to produce and is logistically less demanding due to having no requirements for specialist explosives. However, NERA is less effective against incoming munitions in general than ERA due to the absence of propellant to disrupt the incoming blow and instead relies on the deformation of its component materials. In this aspect, ERA is often superior due to having much greater raw stopping power upon being hit.

Active protection systems are divided between two categories, 'soft-kill' and 'hard-kill'. Soft-kill systems use lasers, infrared jamming or other interference with the guidance system of an incoming guided munition to disrupt their tracking in order to ensure they miss the target. Such systems include Shtora-1 system present on Russian T-90A and T-80UK MBTs and the AN/VLQ-8A system found on certain variants of the M1 Abrams. Soft-kill systems do not protect against unguided munitions. Hard-kill systems, in contrast, utilize a sensor to detect incoming threats which then launches a counter-munition to physically destroy the incoming munition. Hard-kill systems can protect against hypersonic threats such as APFSDS rounds, but this is extremely demanding on the reaction speed of the sensor and counter-munition suite; most hard-kill APS have a set range of threat speeds in which they are able to intercept. They mainly protect against sophisticated IIR or radar guided munitions that are able to defeat soft-kill systems. Slower shells such as HE or HEAT-FS may also be defeated. In particular, the Iron Fist system utilized by Israeli and British vehicles are able to defeat APFSDS rounds at certain ranges. Examples of hard-kill systems include Israeli developments Iron Fist and Trophy, Russian systems Arena and Drozd, and the Chinese system GL-6.

=== Slat ===
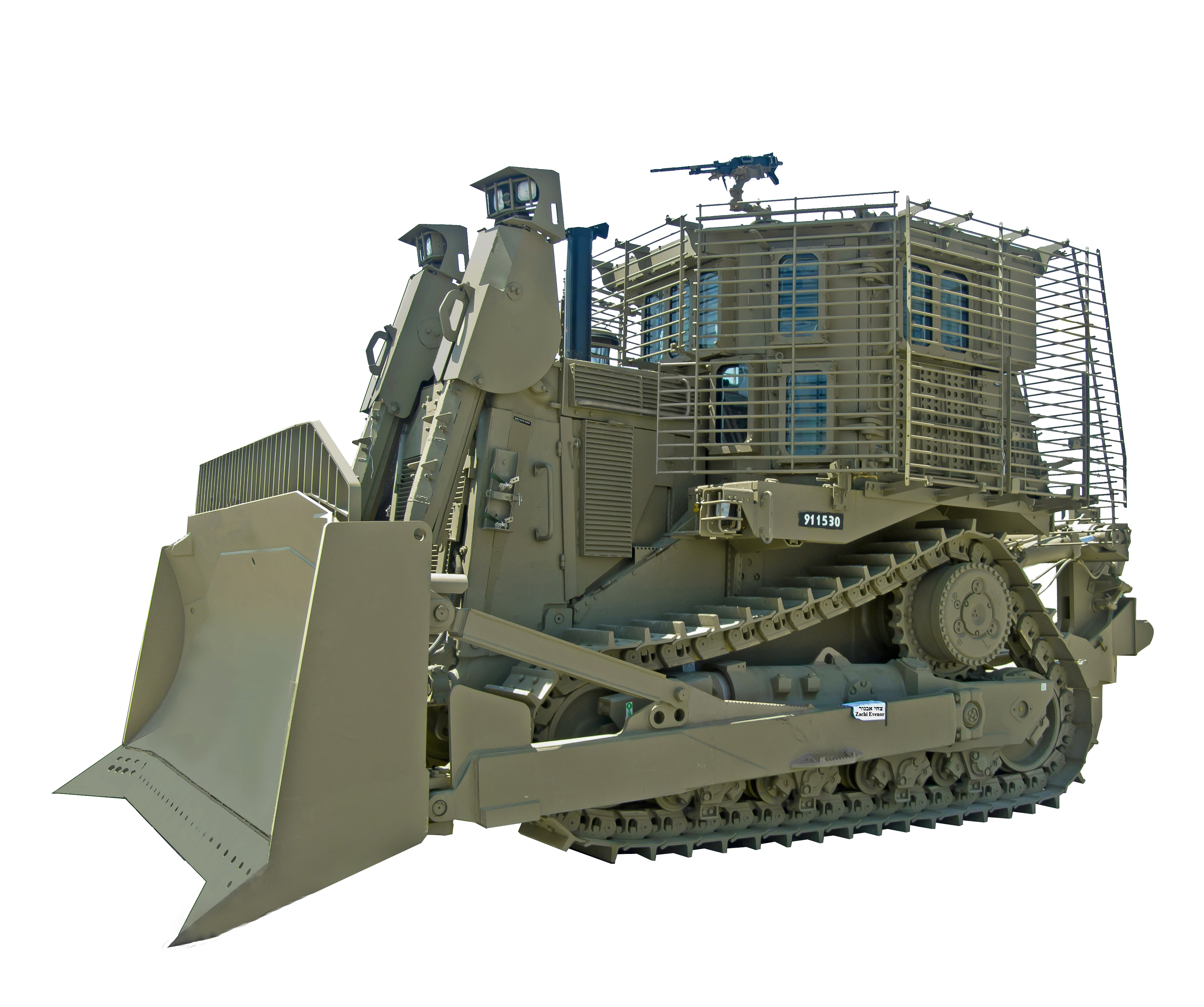
IDF Caterpillar D9 armoured bulldozer with slat armour (in addition to armour plates and bulletproof windows). The D9 armour deflected RPG rockets and even 9K11 Malyutka (AT-3 Sagger) ATGMs.

Slat armour is designed to protect against anti-tank rocket and missile attacks, where the warhead is a shaped charge. The slats are spaced so that the warhead is either partially deformed before detonating, or the fuzing mechanism is damaged, thereby preventing detonation entirely. As shaped charges rely on very specific structure to create a jet of hot metal, any disruption to this structure greatly reduces the effectiveness of the warhead. Slat armour can be defeated by tandem-charge designs such as the RPG-27 and RPG-29.

=== Electric armour ===
Electric armour is a recent development in the United Kingdom by the Defence Science and Technology Laboratory. A vehicle is fitted with two thin shells, separated by insulating material. The outer shell holds an enormous electric charge, while the inner shell is at ground. If an incoming HEAT jet penetrates the outer shell and forms a bridge between the shells, the electrical energy discharges through the jet, disrupting it. Trials have so far been extremely promising, and it is hoped that improved systems could protect against KE penetrators. The developers of the Future Rapid Effect System (FRES) series of armoured vehicles are considering this technology.

== See also ==
- Active protection system
- Armoured fighting vehicle
- Armoured forces
- Main battle tank
- Non-military armoured vehicles
- Personal armour
- Plastic armour
