= Torpedo belt =

Warship armoring scheme (1920s-1940s)

The torpedo belt was part of the armoring scheme in some warships between the 1920s and 1940s. It consisted of a series of lightly armored compartments, extending laterally along a narrow belt that intersected the ship's waterline. In theory this belt would absorb the explosions from torpedoes, or any naval artillery shells that struck below the waterline, and thus minimize internal damage to the ship itself.

Torpedo belts are also known as Side Protection Systems or SPS, or Torpedo Defense System or TDS.

== Background: insufficiency of belt armor ==
Armored warships (pre-dreadnought battleships, armored cruisers, dreadnought battleships, battlecruisers, and later light and heavy cruisers) of the early 20th century carried their main protective armor above the waterline – the "main belt" – which was intended to stop flat-trajectory gunfire from piercing the hull. Below the belt, the armor generally tapered away, to reduce overall weight. This, however, makes a ship vulnerable to hits below the waterline from torpedoes and the occasional large-calibre shell. Extending the belt downwards is impractical, since this increases displacement and draft, reducing speed and seaworthiness.

== Torpedo protection schemes ==
Another solution was needed. Originally, torpedo nets were tried. These were heavy metal mesh nets hung out on booms at some distance from the sides of ships to catch or detonate torpedoes short of the ship. These proved largely ineffective since they could only be deployed when ships were stationary, were useless against shell hits below the waterline, and were ineffective against mines. Some ships were fitted with underwater armor in vulnerable areas below the waterline. This stopped torpedoes from penetrating the ship, but the shock from an underwater explosion could cause damage to weapon mountings and sensitive machinery, along with violently stressing the ships' structure. The German Imperial High Seas Fleet introduced torpedo bulkheads with the armored cruiser Blücher and the simultaneous battleships of the Nassau class since 1908. It was the only fleet during the duration of the First World War to do so.

=== Anti-torpedo bulges ===
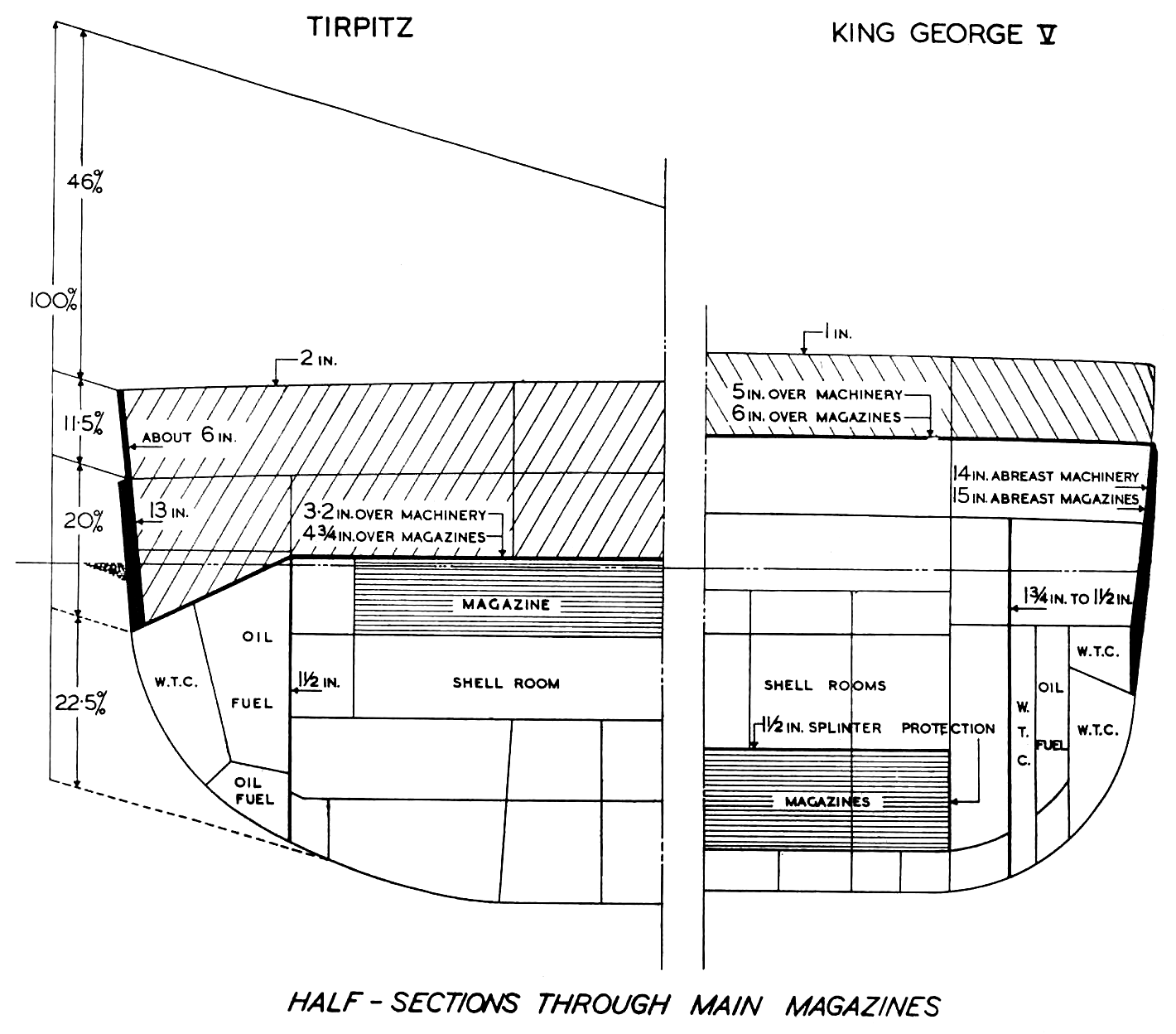
Armor and underwater protection of HMS King George V and Tirpitz

The outbreak of World War I increased the urgency to devise an effective torpedo defense system (TDS), thus the British Director of Naval Construction introduced the anti-torpedo bulge. Originally retrofitted to older ships, this was soon added to ships already under construction. In 1915, the British Renown-class battlecruisers and in 1917 the American Tennessee-class battleships introduced anti-torpedo bulges. Most later capital ships would have at least one torpedo bulkhead inboard of the external hull plating along the area of the ship protected by the armor belt. Most battleships built after World War I had sophisticated and complex side-protection systems, as illustrated by the cross sectional drawing of Tirpitz and HMS King George V (41).

=== Torpedo belts ===
It was not until 1922, in the wake of the Washington Naval Treaty that curtailed ship weights and with the introduction of the British Nelson-class battleships, that a true layered torpedo belt was introduced. The two Nelsons used a water-filled belt, which was written off in the tonnage limits, as water was not part of the calculations for allowed displacement. Over the next 20 years many innovative designs of TDS were tried by various nations.

A warship can be seriously damaged underwater not only by torpedoes, but also by heavy naval artillery shells that plunge into the ocean very close to the targeted ship. Such shells which are usually armor-piercing shells (AP shells) can pass through a short stretch of water and strike the warship some distance below the waterline. In 1914 typical AP shells were expected to punch a hole in the exterior plate and detonate there with a destructive effect similar to a torpedo. However by the 1940s, advances in AP shell technology incorporated delayed fuses which give AP shells deep penetration capability before exploding; such AP shells will typically make a smaller hole than a torpedo in breaching a ship's hull, but detonating beyond the belt in the hull can cause splinter damage to machinery spaces and secondary magazines, which in turn compromises watertight integrity and encourages progressive flooding. To improve protection against both shells and torpedoes, an air space can be added between the torpedo belt and the hull to increase the buoyancy of the warship.

== Today ==
After the end of World War II torpedo belts, much like many of the large warships they protected, were rendered obsolete by the widespread use of aircraft, and eventually—especially in the late 60s and into the 70s—by the use of anti-ship missiles, and a new generation of "smart", deep-diving torpedoes (such as the Mark 48) which are designed to detonate under a ship's keel and break its back.

== Bibliography ==
- Okun, Nathan (2010). "Question 27/45: Yamato Class Lower Belt Connection". Warship International. XLVII (2): 93–95. ISSN 0043-0374.
