= Belt armor =

Armor applied to a warship's hull

Diagram of common elements of warship armor. The belt armor (A) is on the exterior, at the waterline. Also indicated is the main deck (B), the sloping deck armor (C), and the torpedo bulkhead (D).

Belt armor is a layer of heavy metal armor plated onto or within the outer hulls of warships, typically on battleships, battlecruisers and cruisers, and aircraft carriers.

The belt armor is designed to prevent projectiles from penetrating to the heart of a warship. When struck by an artillery shell or underwater torpedo, the belt armor either absorbs the impact and explosion with its sheer thickness and strength, or else uses sloping to redirect the projectile and its blast downwards.

Typically, the main armor belt covers the warship from its main deck down to some distance below the waterline. If, instead of forming the outer hull, the armor belt is built inside the hull, it is installed at a sloped angle for improved protection, as described above.

== The torpedo bulkhead ==
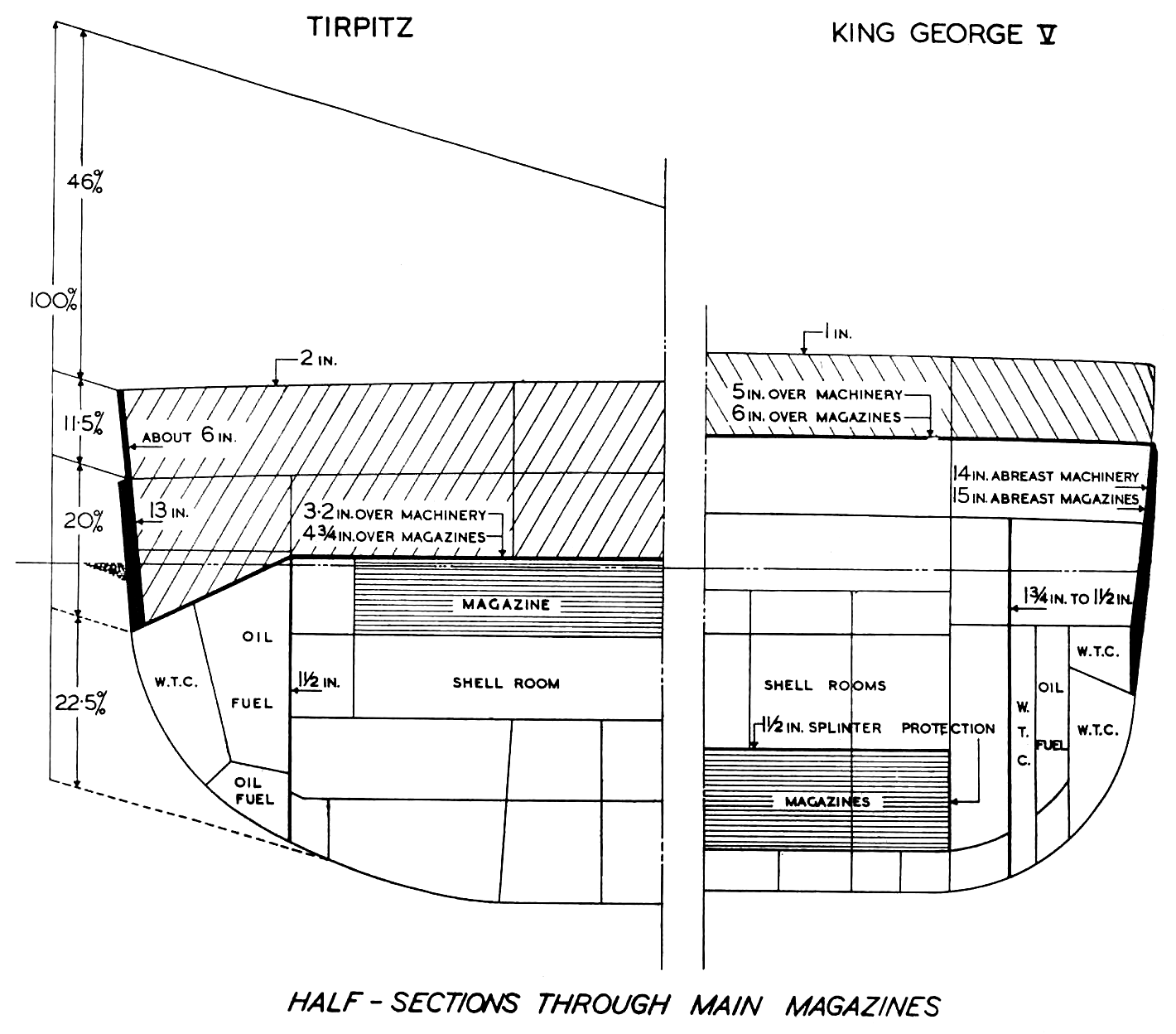
Armor and underwater protection of King George V and Tirpitz.

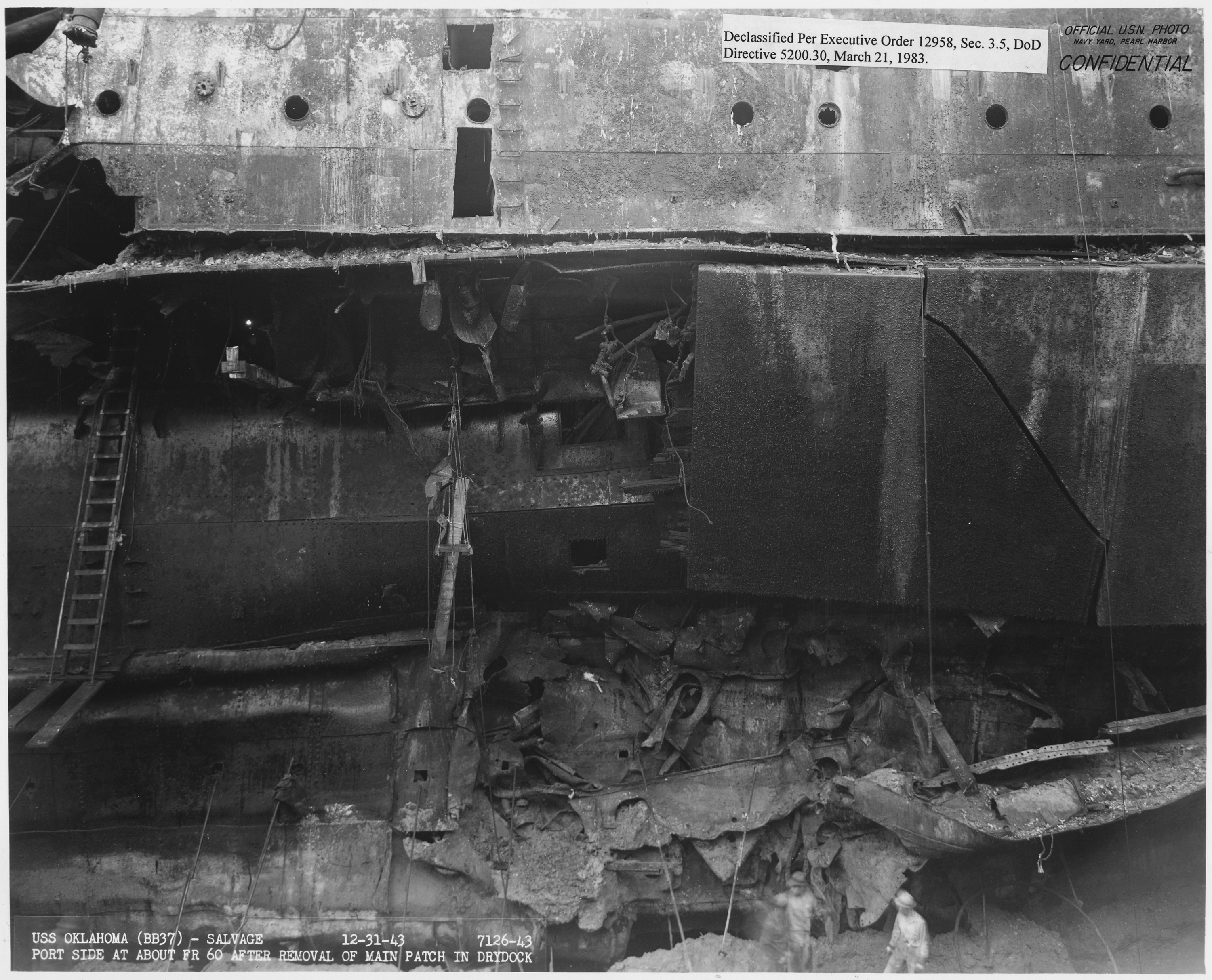
Belt armor on damaged USS Oklahoma (BB-37).

Frequently, the main belt's armor plates were supplemented with a torpedo bulkhead spaced several meters behind the main belt, designed to maintain the ship's watertight integrity even if the main belt was penetrated. Furthermore, the outer spaces around the main belt in some designs were filled with storage tanks that could contain fuel oil, seawater, or fresh water. The liquids in these tanks absorb or scatter much of the explosive force of warheads and shells. In other designs, the outer spaces were left empty, allowing some of the initial blast wave to dissipate, while the inner liquid layers then absorbed shrapnel and spread the shock wave out over a larger area. To deal with the leakage from the tanks and incoming seawater, an armored holding bulkhead prevented liquid from entering other parts of the ship. This multilayer design is featured in the cross-sectional drawings of Tirpitz and King George V.

A warship can be seriously damaged underwater not only by torpedoes, but also by heavy naval artillery shells that plunge into the ocean very close to the targeted ship. Such shells which are usually armor-piercing shells (AP shells) can pass through a short stretch of water and strike the warship some distance below the waterline. In the 1910s, typical AP shells were expected to punch a hole in the exterior plate and detonate there with a destructive effect similar to a torpedo. However by the 1940s, advances in AP shell technology incorporated delayed fuses which give AP shells deep penetration capability before exploding; such AP shells will typically make a smaller hole than a torpedo in breaching a ship's hull, but detonating beyond the belt in the hull can cause splinter damage to machinery spaces and secondary magazines, which in turn compromises watertight integrity and encourages progressive flooding. To improve protection against both shells and torpedoes, an air space can be added between the torpedo belt and the hull to increase the buoyancy of the warship.

== Thinning the belt armor ==
Some kinds of naval warships have belt armor thinner than actually necessary for protection against projectiles. This is common especially with battlecruisers and aircraft carriers to reduce their weight, thus increasing their acceleration and speed. For battlecruisers, sacrificing armor for speed and firepower was a valid tradeoff as long as they were pitting against smaller weaker opponents like cruisers whose guns were unable penetrate the reduced armor of battlecruisers. Another possible reason is to meet treaty restrictions on ship displacement; one such method is all-or-nothing armoring, where belt armor is stripped from areas deemed non-vital to the functioning of the ship in battle. Agility gained from such processes is a great asset to offensive warships, which seek to quickly bring their heavy striking power to the enemy.

=== Aircraft carriers ===
Aircraft carriers typically had even thinner belt armor than battlecruisers and cruisers, despite being expected to face the threat of dive bombers and torpedo bombers more so than other warships. The Washington Naval Treaty and subsequent treaties all imposed tonnage limitations that made it extremely difficult to build a fleet carrier that was fast and could carry a large airwing, unless protection was sacrificed. Unlike battleships and battlecruisers, aircraft carriers were not expected to face torpedoes and naval artillery from other surface ships, instead being deployed at a stand-off distance while being escorted by a screen of destroyers and cruisers.

The fleet carrier's main hope of survival were fighters (often organized into a combat air patrol) which aimed to intercept enemy planes before they could get through. For point defense, there were anti-aircraft guns on the escorting ships and the carrier itself, while the carrier's high speed and maneuverability (see below - originally meant to facilitate launch and recovery of its airwing) would enable them to dodge torpedoes. In carriers, the maneuverability is exploited when deploying and recovering aircraft. Since planes take off and land most easily when flying into the wind, the aircraft carrier steams rapidly into the wind in both maneuvers, making take-off and landing safer and easier. To this end, nearly all fleet aircraft carriers have had speeds of 30 knots or more: for example, the sister ships USS Lexington and USS Saratoga, the second and third aircraft carriers to enter the U.S. Navy, in 1927. The emphasis on speed over armor meant that carriers had a much lower survivability, such that a damaged carrier could not remain in the combat zone, unlike a battleship which usually has sufficient armor and buoyancy to survive the initial hits and able to withstand further attacks. For instance, USS Saratoga was twice sent home after being crippled by single torpedo hits.

The Shōkaku-class (two members) and Taihō were the first Japanese carriers to have a torpedo belt system as they were designed free of treaty tonnage limitations. However, the torpedo defense system failed to save either of these three ships. During the Battle of the Philippine Sea, Shōkaku was refueling aircraft (an extremely vulnerable state for any carrier to be caught) when struck by several submarine-launched torpedoes, the impact which shattered and ignited the aviation fuel mains, leading to an uncontrolled hangar fire which set off stored ammunition. The weight of Taihō's armor immersed her hull so deeply that her lower hangar deck was barely above the load waterline and the bottoms of her two elevator wells (which formed the roofs of her fore and aft aviation fuel tanks) were actually below the waterline and thus more vulnerable to shocks from underwater hits; at Philippine Sea a single submarine-fired torpedo hit on Taihō ruptured two aviation fuel tanks which spread avgas vapors through the hangar; hours later these fumes were eventually ignited by a spark from an electric generator, triggering a series of catastrophic explosions. Having sustained heavy aircraft losses at Philippine Sea, Zuikaku was being sacrificed as a decoy at Cape Engaño, where she had too few aircraft to form an effective combat air patrol, so she was overwhelmed and sunk by the attacking dive bombers and torpedo bombers. The Shinano, originally laid down as the third member of the Yamato-class battleships, had structural weakness in her hull, being hastily constructed near the end of the war and having been equipped with incomplete belt armor and unsealed watertight compartments, at the time of her sinking by an American submarine.

== See also ==
- Torpedo belt
- Protected cruiser
- Armored cruiser
