= Torpedo bulkhead =

Internal armor layer within a warship

Diagram of common elements of warship armor. The belt armor (A) is on the exterior, at the waterline. Also indicated is the main deck (B), the sloping deck armor (C), and the torpedo bulkhead (D).

A torpedo bulkhead is a type of naval armor common on the more heavily armored warships, especially battleships and battlecruisers of the early 20th century. It is designed to keep the ship afloat even if the hull is struck underneath the belt armor by a shell or by a torpedo.

== History ==
As early torpedoes had demonstrated their effectiveness at seriously damaging ships below the waterline by the 1880s, naval designers began developing methods to better protect ships against the new weapons. The earliest protection scheme was devised by Sir Edward Reed in 1884; he proposed a double bottom that included an armored inner hull lining that connected to the bottom edges of the belt armor. It was not adopted, as it imposed serious limitations on internal space and reduced the thickness of the belt. Subsequent, early attempts relied primarily on the coal bunkers, on the assumption that the ship's coal would absorb the blast effects, which would be contained by the interior longitudinal bulkhead. A significant problem with these early arrangements was that once the coal was depleted, the empty compartments offered little to no resistance; worse still, coal dust could explode, and given that the bunkers needed to be accessed by boiler room crews, they could not easily be made watertight.

In the 1910s, naval designers began to transition from coal to fuel oil to power their ships; bunkers filled with liquid fuel proved to be much more effective at absorbing the blast effects of an underwater explosion, and unlike coal bunkers, they could be filled with water once emptied. During this period, many designers also began to adopt multi-layered protection schemes, some of which were also coupled with anti-torpedo bulges, to improve the survivability of their ships. The historian Roger Branfill-Cook characterizes the American Tennessee-class battleships, designed in 1915, as having the best layout of the period, which featured three armored bulkheads layered between three liquid-filled compartments, and placed between an empty void and unarmored bulkhead on either side. For example, the last US battleship designs during World War II had up to four torpedo bulkheads and a triple-bottom. During the 1930s, some designers experimented with empty tubes running the length of the torpedo defense system, most notably the Pugliese system, though these proved to be largely ineffective.

In multi-bulkhead systems, the innermost bulkhead is commonly referred to as the "holding bulkhead", and often this bulkhead would be manufactured from high-tensile steel that could deform and absorb the pressure pulse from a torpedo hit without breaking. If the final bulkhead was at least 37 mm thick, it may also be referred to as an "armored bulkhead", as it would be capable of stopping splinters and shells with low striking velocities.

== See also ==
- Anti-torpedo bulge
- Torpedo belt
