= Taketaba =

Historical Japanese bulletproof shield

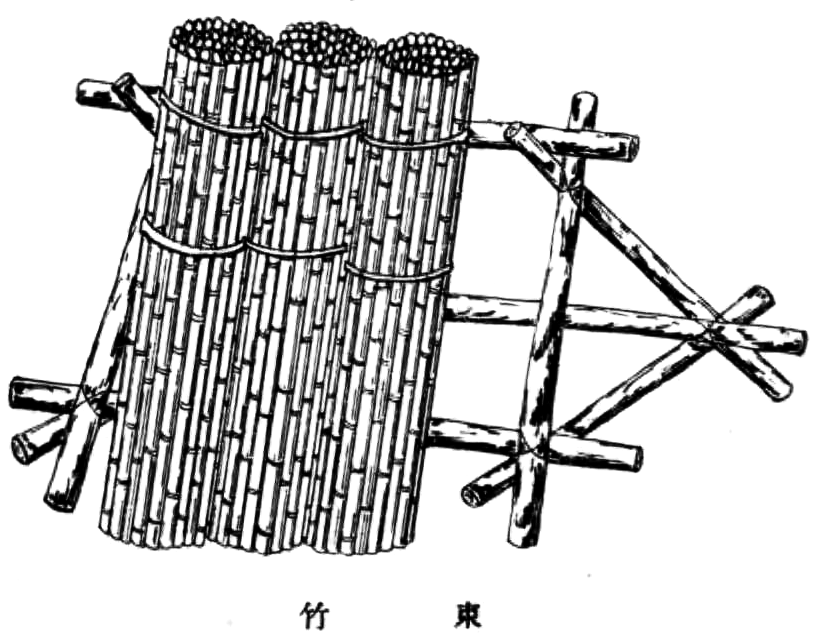
Illustration from 1935 of three taketaba supported by a taketaba-ushi.

A taketaba (竹束) was a Japanese type of bulletproof shield made from bundled bamboo.

== Summary ==
During the 16th century traditional pavises made of wooden planks (盾, tate), long used as a defense against arrows, were found unable to stop the bullets used by the recently introduced arquebus.

The bullets used at the time were of very large caliber and thus had great destructive power, but their round shape and the lack of rifled barrels resulted in poor target penetration. Combined with the flexible strength of bamboo, this allowed taketaba to absorb and dissipate the energy of an arquebus shot. Because bamboo was in plentiful supply, taketaba were mass-produced and used throughout Japan. According to one version, taketaba were invented by Takenaka Shigeharu.

Taketaba could be set up at an obtuse angle on a rack called a taketaba-ushi (竹束牛) so as to increase the geometrical thickness of the shield.

Kuki Yoshitaka's fleet, the Kuki suigun, fastened large taketaba to the freeboard of their ships as a defense against cannon shot. Later, the Tokugawa clan developed a type of floating battery with a deck entirely enclosed by a shell of taketaba called a mekura-bune (盲船).

Taketaba could also be laid on the ground in a row to create a duckboard over muddy or otherwise difficult terrain.

== See also ==
- Palisade
- Abatis
