= Electric armour =

Reactive armour utilising electric charge

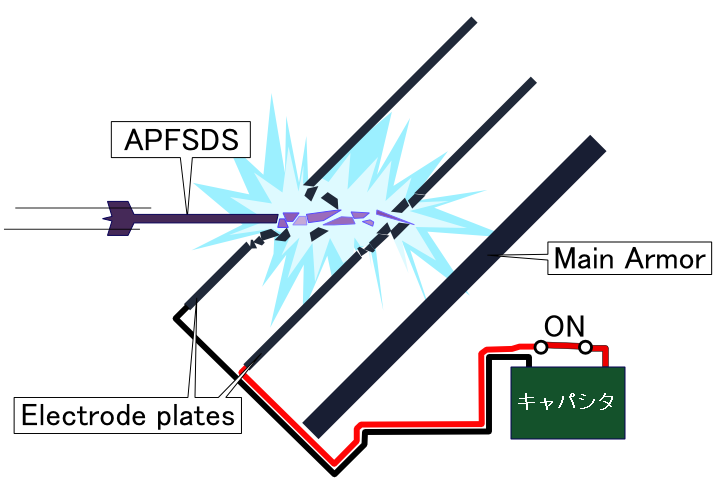
Electric armour drawing

Electric armour or electromagnetic armour is a type of reactive armour proposed for the protection of ships and armoured fighting vehicles from shaped charge and possibly kinetic weapons using a strong electric current, complementing or replacing conventional explosive reacting armour (ERA).

== Overview ==
Electric armour is a newer reactive armour technology. This armour is made up of two or more conductive plates separated by an air gap or by an insulating material, creating a high-power capacitor. In operation, a high-voltage power source charges the armour. When an incoming body penetrates the plates, it closes the circuit to discharge the capacitor, dumping a great deal of energy into the penetrator, vaporizing it or even turning it into a plasma, significantly diffusing the attack.

Another version of electric armour uses layers of plates of electromagnetic metal with silicone spacers on alternate sides. The damage to the exterior of the armour passes electricity into the plates causing them to magnetically move together. As the process is completed at the speed of electricity the plates are moving when struck by the projectile causing the projectile energy to be deflected whilst the energy is also dissipated in parting the magnetically attracted plates.

=== Advantages ===
==== Weight ====
A key advantage of electric armour is its lighter weight. Whereas ERA can add 10 to 20 tons of weight to a tank in explosives, electric armour could be effective with as little as a few tons of weight, significantly reducing the load on the tank and allowing its weight capacity and engine power to be used elsewhere. In addition, electric armour could be mounted on other armoured vehicles such as infantry fighting vehicles and armoured personnel carriers which had sacrificed the protection of heavy armour and ERA for mobility and lightness, thus improving the survivability of troops onboard.

==== Coverage ====
The light weight of electric armour also means that the benefits of its protection can be spread over the whole vehicle. Due to the weight of plating, conventional armour has to be uneven in its coverage, with tanks' thickest armour placed at the most exposed front, the sides less protected, and the top and rear often highly vulnerable in comparison. This fact can be exploited by an agile enemy capable of outflanking their opponents or ambushes such as those common in the asymmetric warfare of modern insurgency. Top attack weapons such as the US FGM-148 Javelin exploit this as well, using a missile which plunges from above to attack and penetrate the tank's thin top. By utilizing electric armour and applying it to the entire vehicle, these risks could be negated.

==== Operational safety ====
A secondary advantage is the increased safety of infantry and light vehicles operating near tanks with electric armour instead of ERA. Although ERA plates are intended only to bulge following detonation, the combined energy of the ERA explosive, coupled with the kinetic or explosive energy of the projectile, will frequently cause explosive fragmentation of the plate. The explosion of an ERA plate creates a significant amount of shrapnel, and those in the vicinity are in grave danger of fatal injury.

=== Disadvantages ===
Due to the novel nature of electric armour and the secrecy of military development, it is unclear whether it is supposed to function against both shaped charge jets and the more recent kinetic energy penetrators or only the former, with sources mostly focusing on shaped charges, especially that of RPGs. Shaped charges such as those in said RPGs or HEAT rounds project a hypersonic jet of molten metal particles to penetrate armour, whereas kinetic APFSDS rounds, the main anti-tank ammunition in use by modern tanks, utilize a solid rod of metal which require more electrical charge to effectively diffuse the attack, possibly beyond current capabilities. Despite being rather economical in terms of energy, electric armour systems are therefore limited in their effectiveness by the ability of the vehicle equipping them to generate sufficient electricity for the system.

== Examples ==
=== United Kingdom ===
Electric armour is a development in the United Kingdom by the Defence Science and Technology Laboratory, named the 'Pulsed Power' System. A vehicle is fitted with two thin shells, separated by insulating material. The outer shell holds an enormous electric charge, while the inner shell is at ground. If an incoming HEAT jet of a conductive metal such as copper penetrates both shells, it forms a bridge between them, and the electrical energy discharges rapidly through the jet, vaporizing it. Trials with an armoured personnel carrier have so far been promising, and it is hoped that improved systems could protect against kinetic energy penetrators. Developers of the Future Rapid Effect System (FRES) series of armoured vehicles were considering this technology before its cancellation.

=== United States ===
Scientists at the United States Army Research Laboratory have also published details about electric armour in New Scientist. Each tank would be covered with tiles made of strong plastic under which a sandwich of different materials would be installed. A mat of optical fibres would be the top layer, followed by a thin sheet of standard armour plating, and then a series of metal coils. On striking the plastics the optical fibers would be severed, triggering sensors to activate electrical capacitors inside the tank which would then send a powerful electrical current surging through the metal coils at the base of the electric armour. The U.S. Army has also tested electric armour concepts on the Bradley Fighting Vehicle.

== See also ==
- Reactive armour
- Vehicle armour
- Anti-tank warfare
- Anti-tank guided missile
- Armoured fighting vehicle
- Active protection system
