= Iron armour =

Type of warship fortification

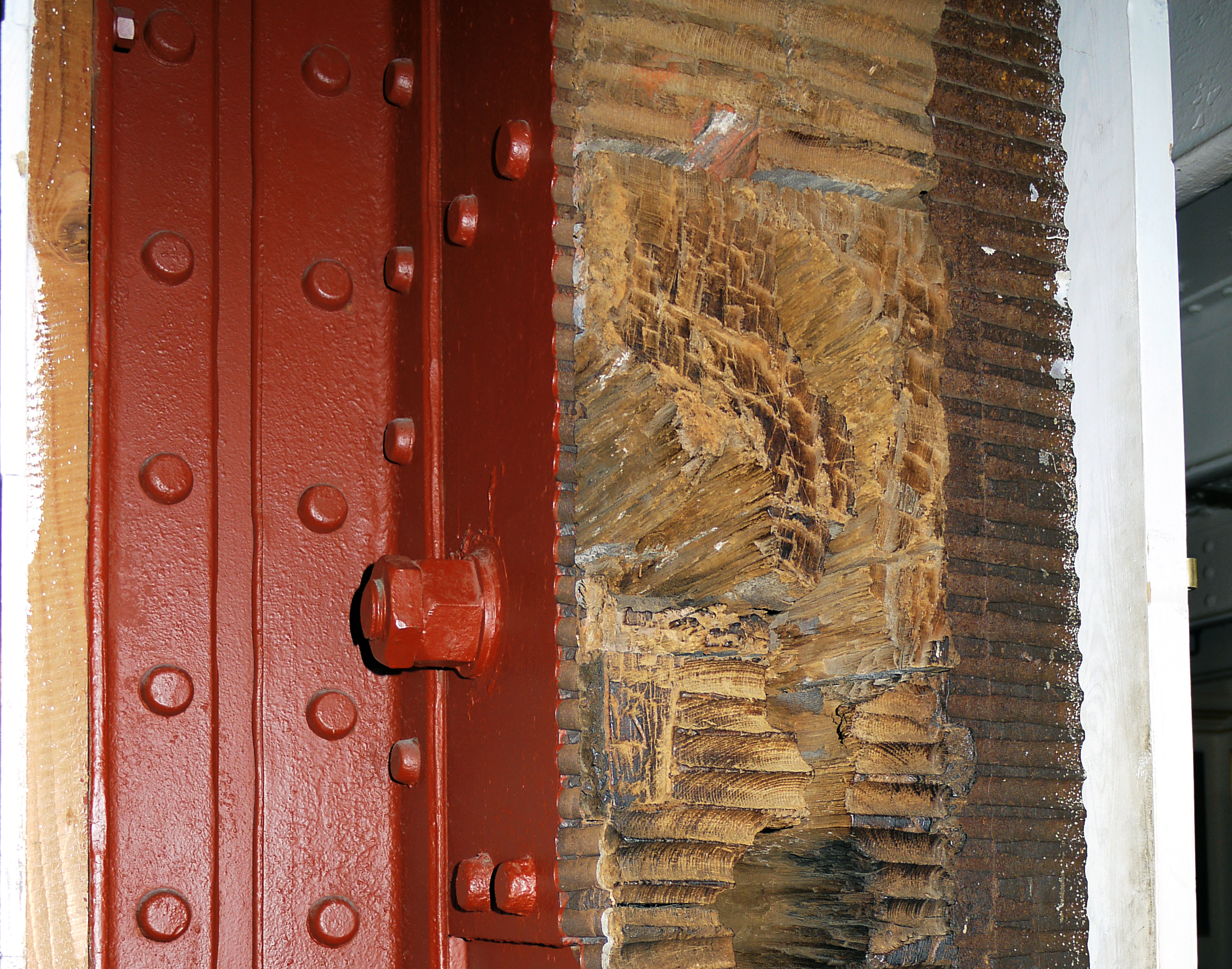
Cross section of HMS Warrior's bulkhead armour

Iron armour was a type of naval armour used on warships and, to a limited degree, fortifications. The use of iron gave rise to the term ironclad as a reference to a ship 'clad' in iron. The earliest material available in sufficient quantities for armouring ships was iron, wrought or cast. While cast iron has never been used for naval armour, it did find a use in land fortifications, presumable due to the lower cost of the material. One well known example of cast-iron armour for land use is the Gruson turret, first tested by the Prussian government in 1868. Armoured ships may have been built as early as 1203, in the Far East. In the West, they first become common when France launched the first ocean-going ironclad La Gloire in 1859. The British Navy responded with HMS Warrior in 1860, triggering a naval arms race with bigger, more heavily armed and armoured ironclads.

Early experiments showed that wrought iron was superior to cast iron, and wrought iron was subsequently adopted for naval use. British efforts at perfecting iron armour were headed by a government Special Committee on Iron, formed in 1861 by War Secretary Lord Herbert for the continued research into naval armour. Among its members was Sir William Fairbairn, a noted civil and structural engineer who had also built over 80 iron vessels before retiring from shipbuilding. Other members included metallurgist John Percy, civil engineer William Pole and representatives of the Royal Engineers, Royal Artillery and Royal Navy. This committee worked four years, between 1861 and 1865, during which time it formulated the best performing armor with the metallurgy as then known, suggested ways for improving its production and quality and helped develop more effective shot against ironclad vessels.

For instance, two processes were used in constructing iron armor. In the first, hammering, large lumps of iron of scrap or puddled iron were heated to welding temperature and placed under heavy steel hammers. Repeated blows welded these lumps into one solid plate and shaped it to the required form and dimensions. Hammered iron plate was the armor used in the earliest ironclad vessels, including HMS Warrior. The second method, rolling, involved stacking iron lumps atop one another, heating them to welding temperature and passing them between two iron rollers to become one plate of the required size. Rolled iron was difficult to produce initially, as it required machinery of immense size and great power. However, when the Special Committee tested both types of plate in 1863, it found that rolled iron was superior to hammered due to greater uniformity in quality. The committee and iron manufacturers worked together on how to more easily produce rolled plate, which became standard use in warships beginning in 1865.

The committee addressed the use of wooden backing with iron armor. Early European iron armour consisted of between four and five inches (roughly 10 to 13 cm) of wrought iron backed by between 18 and 36 inches (roughly one-half to one metre) of solid wood. After considerable testing, the committee found that wood prevented spalling, cushioned the shock of a hit from damaging the structure of the ship and distributed the force over a larger area, which prevented penetration. The drawback of using wood and iron was extreme weight. Experiments with reducing or eliminating wooden backing to save weight proved unsuccessful. The committee also tested steel as potential armor as its members felt that the harder the armor, the better it might deflect or resist shot. However, the steel being produced at that time proved too brittle to be effective. Iron, being softer, bent, dented and distorted but held together and remained an effective means of protection.

Experiments were also carried out with laminated armour, but these did not lead to any improvements and single plates were preferred. Many ships made during the US Civil War used laminated armour but this was necessitated by lack of facilities for manufacturing single plates of proper thickness.

Due to the ever increasing thickness of the armour, and the associated weight, proposals were made from an early date to faceharden the iron or weld steel plates to the front face of iron armour. Efforts to carry out these proposals failed for many reasons, primarily because the metallurgy at the time was not up to the task.

By the mid-to-late 1870s, iron armour started to give way to steel armour, which promised to reduce the thickness, and therefore the weight, of the armour.
