= Disney bomb =

WW2 British bunker buster bomb

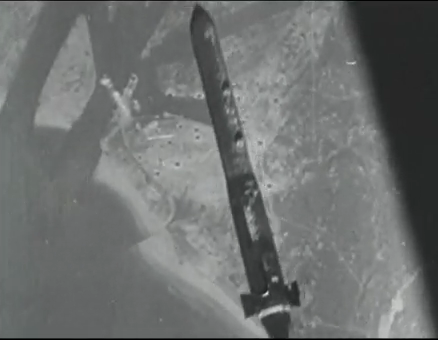
- A Disney bomb just after release
- Type: Bunker buster bomb Unguided air-to-surface rocket
- Place of origin: United Kingdom

Service history
- In service: 1945–46
- Used by: United States Army Air Forces
- Wars: World War II

Production history
- Designer: Edward Terrell
- Designed: 1943
- Manufacturer: Vickers Armstrong

Specifications
- Mass: 4,500 lb (2,000 kg)
- Length: 16 ft 6 in (5.03 m) (Note: Spillman gives 14 feet (4.3 m))
- Diameter: Body: 15 in (380 mm); Tail 17 in (430 mm) (Note: Spillman gives a diameter of 11 inches (280 mm))
- Warhead: Shellite
- Warhead weight: 500 lb (230 kg)
- Detonation mechanism: Base fuze
- Propellant: Cordite
- Launch platform: Boeing B-17 Flying Fortress

The Disney bomb, also known as the Disney Swish, officially the 4500 lb Concrete Piercing/Rocket Assisted bomb was a 4,500 lb bunker buster bomb developed during the Second World War by the British Royal Navy to penetrate hardened concrete targets, such as submarine pens, which could resist conventional free-fall bombs.

Devised by Royal Navy Captain Edward Terrell, the bomb was fitted with solid-fuel rockets to accelerate its descent, giving it an impact speed of 990 mph (1,590 km/h)—substantially beyond the 750 mph (1,210 km/h) free-fall impact velocity of the 5-tonne Tallboy "earthquake" bomb for comparable purposes.

The Disney could penetrate 16 ft (4.9 m) of solid concrete before detonating. The name is attributed to a propaganda film, Victory Through Air Power, produced by the Walt Disney Studios, a division of The Walt Disney Company, that provided the inspiration for the design.

The Disney bomb saw limited use by the United States Army Air Forces in Europe from February to April 1945. Although it functioned successfully if dropped on a target, it initially could not be dropped accurately enough to attack bunker targets. It was deployed late in the war and had little effect on the Allied bombing campaign against Germany.

== Background ==
During the Second World War, Barnes Wallis developed two large "earthquake" bombs for the Royal Air Force: the five-tonne Tallboy and the ten-tonne Grand Slam, for use against targets too heavily protected to be affected by conventional high-explosive bombs.

These enormous weapons were designed to strike close by their target, to penetrate deeply into the earth, and to cause major structural damage by the shock waves transmitted through the ground. (Note: After sliding into the soil or rock beneath or around the target, the energy of detonation is transferred into the structure or creates a camouflet (cavern or crater) into which the target would fall.) In practice, they proved capable of penetrating a significant thickness of concrete if they scored a direct hit, despite not being designed for that purpose by Wallis, who had to work within the accuracy limitations of current bombsights and the resulting low accuracy of the bombings. (Note: The Royal Air Force introduced into operational service in 1943 an improved precision bombsight: the Stabilizing Automatic Bomb Sight. 617 Squadron achieved a precision of 100 yd (91 m) at the V1 Weapon launch site at Abbeville on 16/17 December 1943.)

The Disney bomb, by contrast, was designed from the start to penetrate the thick concrete roofs of fortified bunkers. Whereas the earthquake bomb's target was the bunker itself, the Disney bomb's target was the bunker's contents. To this end, the warhead was composed of an unusually thick steel shell containing a comparatively small amount of explosive. (Note: The Disney's explosive charge was 11% of the weight of the bomb. Around 50% of the weight of conventional bombs is explosive (see General-purpose bomb)) It was much slimmer than was usual for aircraft-dropped bombs, and a cluster of booster rockets accelerated the weapon as it fell. These features accord with Newton's approximation for impact depth and the empirical design equation known as Young's equation that states that the deepest target penetration is achieved by a projectile that is dense, long and thin (i.e. has a large sectional density), and strikes with a high velocity.

== Description ==
The CP/RA (Note: The Disney bomb was officially codenamed the 4500-lb CP/RA bomb. CP/RA stands for Concrete Piercing/Rocket Assisted.) Disney bombs were 16 ft 6 in (5.03 m) long and weighed 4,500 pounds (2,000 kg). The diameter of the body of the bomb was 11 in (280 mm), while the diameter at the tail was 17 in (430 mm). They were composed of three sections.

The forward section was the warhead, an explosive charge of 500 pounds (230 kg) of shellite, contained within an armour-piercing casing of thick steel and fitted with two British No.58 MK I tail pistol fuses at the base (i.e. furthest from the nose). (Note: The No.58 MK I tail Pistol that also equipped the Tallboy bombs were manufactured by Midgley Harmer Limited (London).)

The second section was made up of nineteen rocket motors from the 3-inch Rocket Projectile—essentially metal tubes filled with cordite. In the third rear section, a tail cone contained the circuit that ignited the rockets. This was powered by a small generator with a vane spun by the airstream going past the falling bomb. Rocket ignition was controlled either by a time-delay switch, or a barometric switch. (Note: A switch activated by changes in atmospheric pressure. Also known as "baroswitch". See Applications of pressure sensors.)

There were six small fins at the rear of the bomb for stabilisation. The bomb was suspended from the aircraft by two weight-bearing lugs. Three arming wires also connected the bomb and the aircraft; as the bomb dropped, a brief tug from the wires would arm the warhead fuses and the rocket-ignition circuit, and unlock the electrical generator, allowing it to spin freely.

Diagram and close-up of a Disney bomb
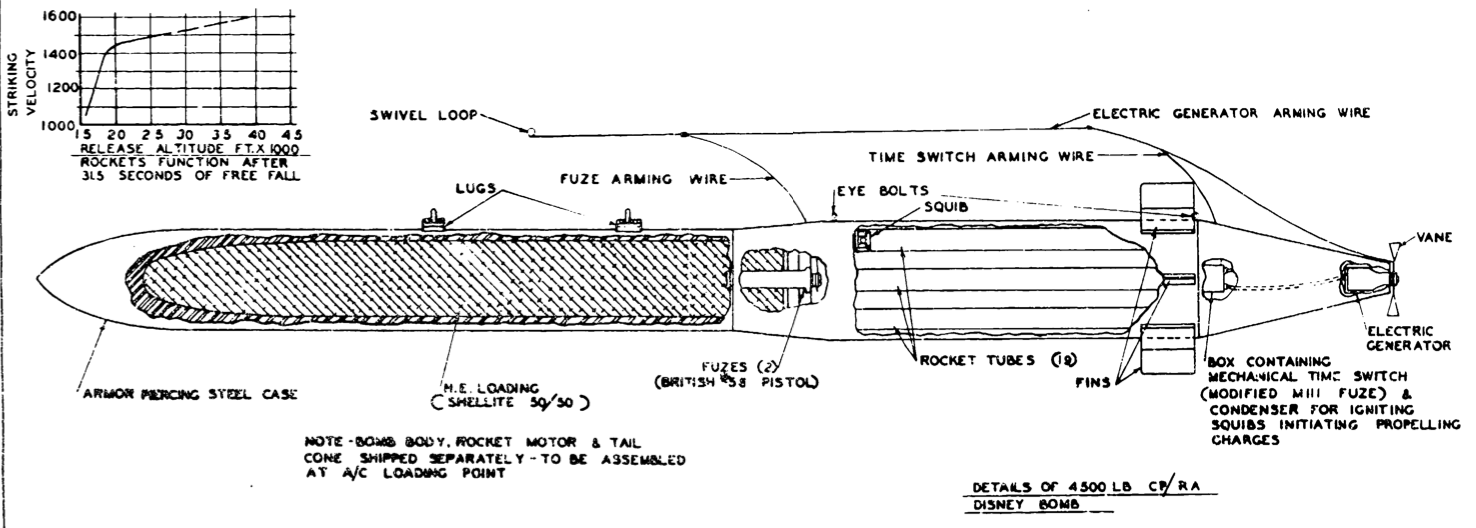
Diagram of a Disney bomb

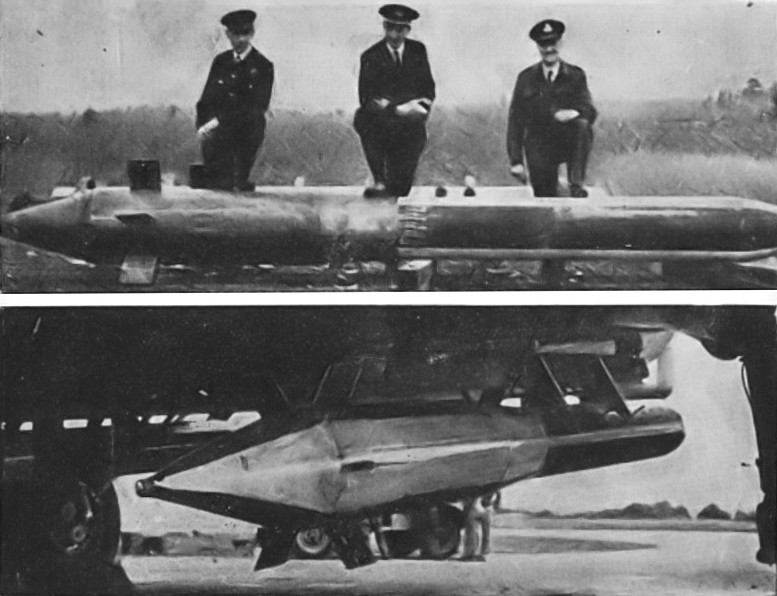
A Disney bomb with Lt-Cdr Murray, Edward Terrell, and an "Air Force Armament Officer". Lower image: a bomb mounted under a B-17 Flying Fortress

For accuracy, the bombs had to be dropped precisely from a pre-determined height, usually 20,000 feet (6,100 m). They would free-fall for around 30 seconds until, at 5,000 feet (1,500 m), the rockets were ignited, causing the tail section to be expelled. The rocket burn lasted for three seconds and added 300 feet per second (91 m/s) to the bomb's speed, giving a final impact speed of 1,450 feet per second (440 m/s), equivalent to 990 miles per hour (1,590 km/h) or approximately Mach 1.29. (Note: Other sources mention a striking speed of 2,400 feet per second (730 m/s; 1,600 mph).)

Post-war tests demonstrated the bombs were able to penetrate a 14-foot-8-inch-thick (4.47 m) concrete roof, with the predicted, but untested ability to penetrate 16 feet 8 inches (5.08 m) of concrete.

== Development and testing ==
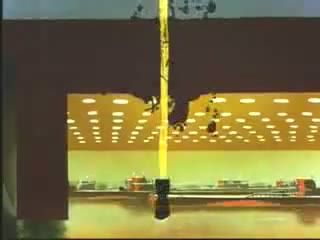
A rocket bomb destroys a U-boat pen in the Disney animated film Victory Through Air Power (1943)

According to an anecdote, the idea arose after a group of Royal Navy officers saw a similar, but fictional, bomb depicted in the 1943 Walt Disney animated propaganda film Victory Through Air Power, (Note: A film adaptation of the book Victory Through Air Power by the air warfare advocate Alexander de Seversky) and the name Disney was consequently given to the weapon. The Royal Navy developed the bomb even though the Fleet Air Arm operated no aircraft capable of carrying it. (Note: Strategic attacks against German shipping, warships and ports were carried out by RAF Coastal Command.) The navy was interested in a concrete-penetrating weapon due to the German navy's extensive use of fortified submarine pens to protect their U-boats and E-boats from air attack while docked.

The Disney Bomb was devised by a British naval officer, Captain Edward Terrell of the Royal Naval Volunteer Reserve, who served in the Directorate of Miscellaneous Weapons Development. Before the war, he had been a lawyer and the Recorder of Newbury. He was also an enthusiastic inventor and had filed several patents pre-war, including ones for a vegetable peeling knife and a bottle for fountain pen ink.

The Disney bomb on the cover of Edward Terrell's book Admiralty Brief: The Story of Inventions that Contributed to Victory in The Battle of the Atlantic (1958)

The bomb's development began in September 1943. Although there was support for the idea at the highest levels within the Admiralty, production of the weapon would have to come under the Ministry of Aircraft Production (MAP). The Road Research Laboratory (Note: The RRL had aided the development of Barnes Wallis' bouncing bomb.) provided theoretical formula for penetration from US data on the performance of 15-inch (381 mm) shells against reinforced concrete, and the Chief Engineer of Armament Development at Fort Halstead prepared a preliminary design to present to the MAP.

In the face of opposition, the First Sea Lord prepared a memorandum for the Anti-U-Boat Committee, of which Churchill was the chairman. Terrell visited Churchill's scientific adviser Lord Cherwell to convince him that it was feasible technically. Due to the Prime Minister's absence through illness, it was not until January 1944 that Churchill expressed a desire that the bomb should be considered by the committee. Due to the number of departments involved there were meetings involving large numbers of technicians and scientists to confirm the technical feasibility.

Terrell received support through the Air Technical Section of the USAAF, and was able to show the Admiralty a mockup under the wing of a Boeing B-17 Flying Fortress. The Air Ministry was still opposed to its development on several technical grounds, and it took a meeting of the War Cabinet in May, which Terrell attended, to decide in its favour, giving it "P plus" priority. As a side effect the meeting focused attention on the issue of the U-boat shelters, and the RAF were directed to make attacks on them, dropping 26 Tallboys in August 1944.

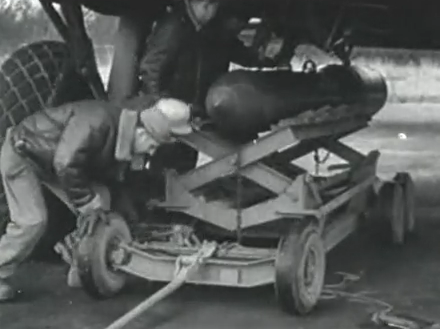
Several American ground crew attaching a Disney bomb to the underside of a B-17 bomber.

Despite being a British weapon, Disneys were used only by the United States Army Air Force, with the bombs becoming a joint project between the American Eighth Air Force and the British Royal Navy. They were never used by RAF Bomber Command. (Note: The reason for this is unclear. In the Avro Lancaster, the RAF had a bomber with a large enough bomb bay and sufficient lift. Several sources (Freeman 2001, p. 228; McArthur 1990, p. 280) cite unspecified technical reasons that prevented the use of British aircraft. Terrell states that the B-17 was the only aircraft capable of bearing the weight "under its wings") The 92nd Bombardment Group was initially tasked with their use. The bombs were also dropped by the 305th Bombardment Group and 306th Bombardment Group. The 94th Bombardment Group prepared to use the bombs, but flew no operations with them before the war in Europe ended.

The Boeing B-17 Flying Fortresses operated by these units carried the bombs in pairs. One was slung under each wing, as they were too long to be carried in the B-17's bomb bay. The Disneys were carried from the same external mounting used for the Aeronca GB-1 glide bomb. Cameras were fitted to the aircraft so the bombs' trajectory and effect could be recorded.

Testing of the Disney bombs began in early 1945. Bombs were initially dropped on a bombing range near Southampton to photographically record their trajectory and calibrate bombsights. This was necessary as the flight-path of a rocket-accelerated bomb differed considerably from that of a free-falling bomb. Test drops were then conducted on the Watten bunker, German codename Kraftwerk Nord West, now known as the Blockhaus d'Éperlecques, a huge German concrete bunker near Watten in northern France. This was ideal for the purpose as the area had been captured by Allied forces in September 1944, so damage to the structure could be inspected after bomb tests. Four bombs, carried by two B-17s, were used and two hits scored on the target. The resultant damage was considered satisfactory by Royal Navy observers on the ground.

== Combat ==
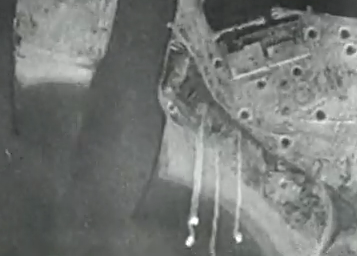
Four Disneys leave rocket trails as they accelerate towards Schnellbootbunker BY (SBB2), IJmuiden, Netherlands, 1945. Still taken from a US Army film.

The first Disney attack was against the port of IJmuiden, Netherlands. This was the site of two separate fortified pens used by the German navy to house their Schnellboote (fast torpedo boats, known to the Allies as "E-boats") and Biber midget submarines. The older structure, codename Schnellbootbunker AY (SBB1), was protected by a 10-foot-thick (3.0 m) concrete roof. The newer one, codename Schnellbootbunker BY (SBB2), had 10–12 feet (3.0–3.7 m) of concrete, with a further 2–4-foot (0.61–1.22 m) layer separated by an air gap. (Note: Only SBB2 has remained until today (52°27′36.72″N 4°34′39.08″E).)

The E-boats laid up in the shelters during the day, safe from air attack, and put to sea under cover of night to attack Allied shipping. The pens were priority targets as the torpedo boats they protected were a considerable threat to the supply lines serving Allied forces in western Europe. Since August 1944, the two bunkers had been attacked four times by No. 9 Squadron and No. 617 Squadron of the RAF, with a total of 53 of the five-ton Tallboy earthquake bombs. There had been numerous other attacks from bombers carrying smaller, conventional bombs.

Nine aircraft of the 92nd Bomb Group, carrying 18 Disneys, attacked Schnellbootbunker BY (SBB2) on 10 February 1945. Royal Navy intelligence learned the concrete had been penetrated, but the pens had been empty at the time of the attack. The 92nd therefore carried out an attack on the SBB1 pen, again with nine aircraft, on 14 March.

A US Army newsreel, reporting on the first Disney attack on IJmuiden.

On 30 March 36 aircraft from the US Eighth Air Force, including 12 from the 92nd Bomb Group, attacked the Valentin submarine pens, a massive, bomb-hardened concrete shelter under construction at the small port of Farge, near Bremen in Germany with Disney bombs. The shelter was nearing completion and was to be a factory for the assembly of Type XXI U-boats. Construction had been under way since 1943, using the forced labour of 10,000 concentration camp prisoners, prisoners of war, and foreign civilians (Fremdarbeiter) who suffered a high death rate because of the horrific conditions they worked under.

Valentin's 4.5-metre-thick (15 ft) roof had already been damaged by two 10-ton Grand Slam bombs dropped by the RAF three days earlier, on 27 March. During the Eighth Air Force attack more than sixty Disneys were launched, but only one hit the target, with little effect, although installations around the bunker received considerable damage. After the bombing the Germans made limited attempts to carry out repairs before abandoning the complex; the area was captured by the British Army four weeks later.

On 4 April 1945, 24 B-17s attacked fortified targets in Hamburg. The target was obscured by cloud so radar guidance was used to launch the bombs. A further mission in May 1945 was cancelled. A total of 158 bombs were dropped before the end of the war. No aircraft or aircrew were lost during the four Disney combat missions.

== Post-war development ==
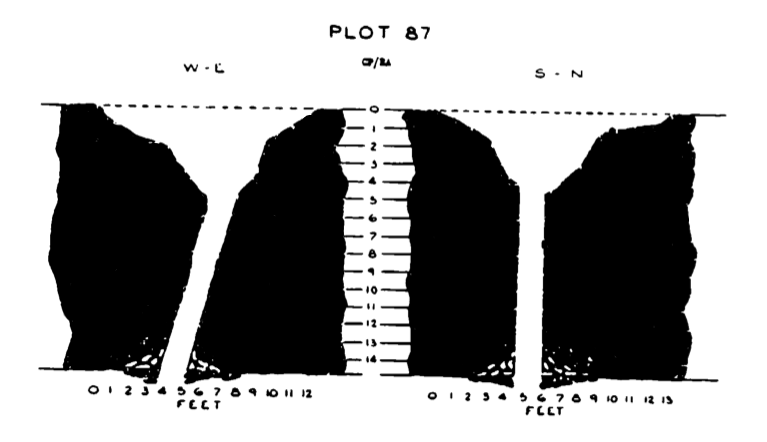
West–east and south–north cross-sections of roof penetration by a Project Ruby Disney strike on the Valentin bunker.

In June 1945 the Air Council (the governing body of the Royal Air Force) wrote to the Lords of the Admiralty expressing "their appreciation" of the work that had been done on the "rocket bomb". The RAF initiated bombing tests of the Disney in June 1945, using the Watten bunker as a target. The actual bombing was carried by the US 8th Air Force on behalf of the RAF. However, Watten proved too small to be a satisfactory target, and the French objected to continued bombing of their territory in peace-time.

Further testing took place as part of Project Ruby. This was a 1946 joint Anglo-American programme to test a range of concrete penetrating bombs against a wartime German bunker on the small island of Heligoland and the Valentin submarine pens. Bombs tested included the Tallboy and the Grand Slam (both British and US-made versions), the American 22,000-pound (10,000 kg) Amazon and 2,000-pound (910 kg) M103 SAP bombs, and the Disney. The bombs dropped on Valentin were inert, as the objective was not to observe the effects of bomb explosions, but rather to test concrete penetration and the strength of the bomb casings. Also, with the restoration of peace, the safety of civilians living around Valentin had become a consideration.

Heligoland was uninhabited at the time as its small population had been evacuated during the war. It was the site of a U-boat pen with a 10-foot-thick (3.0 m) roof. This was used to test bombs loaded with explosive but with inert detonators, to make sure the explosives used would not themselves detonate immediately upon impact with the target, before penetrating it.

This peace-time testing of the bomb was far more extensive than could be carried out prior to its wartime deployment. A total of 76 Disneys were dropped on Heligoland, loaded with a variety of explosive charges, composed of shellite, RDX, TNT, or Picratol. Thirty-four Disneys were dropped on Valentin, 12 with the rockets inactivated and 22 with the rockets firing. A further four had been previously dropped on a bomb range at Orford Ness to test their accuracy, and to make sure none would land outside the safety exclusion zone that was set up around Valentin during the trials.

The penetration performance (14 feet 8 inches (4.47 m) of concrete) of the Disney was found to be satisfactory, with a predicted maximum penetration of 16 ft 8 in (5.08 m). One of the bombs penetrated both Valentin's concrete roof and its 3-foot-thick (0.91 m) concrete floor, coming to rest completely buried in the sand under structure's foundations. However, there were problems with the bombs. The reliability of the rocket booster ignition was considered unsatisfactory, with a failure rate of around 37% during the trials. Also, some bombs broke up on impact with the target due to flaws in the steel casing, and bombs struck at an angle, increasing the effective thickness of concrete they had to penetrate. Furthermore, it was noted that the warhead of the bomb was comparatively small, so a very large bunker complex such as Valentin would have required many penetrating hits to be sure of destroying all the contents.

In comparison, the effective concrete penetration of the Tallboy and Grand Slams was similar to the Disney, around 14 feet (4.3 m). Although these bombs directly penetrated only around 7 feet (2.1 metres) of concrete, the remaining thickness was blown in by the detonation of the bombs' enormous explosive charge. The roof of Valentin had been penetrated by two Grand Slams before the war ended but, as there was no detonation inside the bunker, there was little damage to the complex aside from the large holes in the roof. Post-war examination revealed installations inside the bunker remained comparatively unscathed.

The conclusion of Project Ruby was that none of the bombs tested was completely suitable, and development of a new concrete-penetrating bomb was recommended. The Disney's rocket-assist was viewed as a worthwhile feature that should be incorporated into any new bomb designs because target penetration increases with strike velocity, although penetration increases only marginally from drop altitudes higher than 20,000 feet (6,100 m).

In January 2009, the body of an inactive Disney bomb, with its 500-pound (230 kg) explosive charge, was extracted from the roof of Watten bunker, by then a private museum, where it had embedded itself during one of the 1945 test-drops. The bomb was transferred to the ammunition depot at La Gueule d'Ours, two kilometres from the centre of Vimy, where recovered chemical ammunition and equipment from the First World War is processed.

== See also ==
- German rocket propelled bombs of World War II
- Kinetic energy penetrator, type of ammunition without explosives that uses kinetic energy to penetrate the target
- Matra Durandal, post-war, French, unguided rocket-boosted bomb, designed for use as an anti-runway bomb
- Massive Ordnance Penetrator, a 2000s bunker-buster weapon of similar design and purpose
