= Shellite =

Shellite may refer to:

- An Australian form of Naphtha
- Shellite (explosive), British explosive filling for armour-piercing naval shells of the 1920s to 1930s
