= Leif Ourston =

Leif Ourston was a pioneer proponent of modern roundabouts in the United States, years before any had been built there. He opened his engineering company in 1984, at a time when the American engineering community considered any roundabout a radical and innovative idea, and even the most modest proposals encountered powerful opposition.

== Early career ==
Ourston was introduced to roundabouts in 1979 by Frank Blackmore, while attending training at the Transport and Road Research Laboratory in Berkshire, England. Afterwards, Ourston worked with Caltrans and local agencies to convince the public and highway staff that roundabouts were not a crackpot idea, not the same as old traffic circles, and are instead a valuable, proven, safe, and effective modern intersection suitable for general use in the United States.

== Bringing roundabouts to the U.S. ==
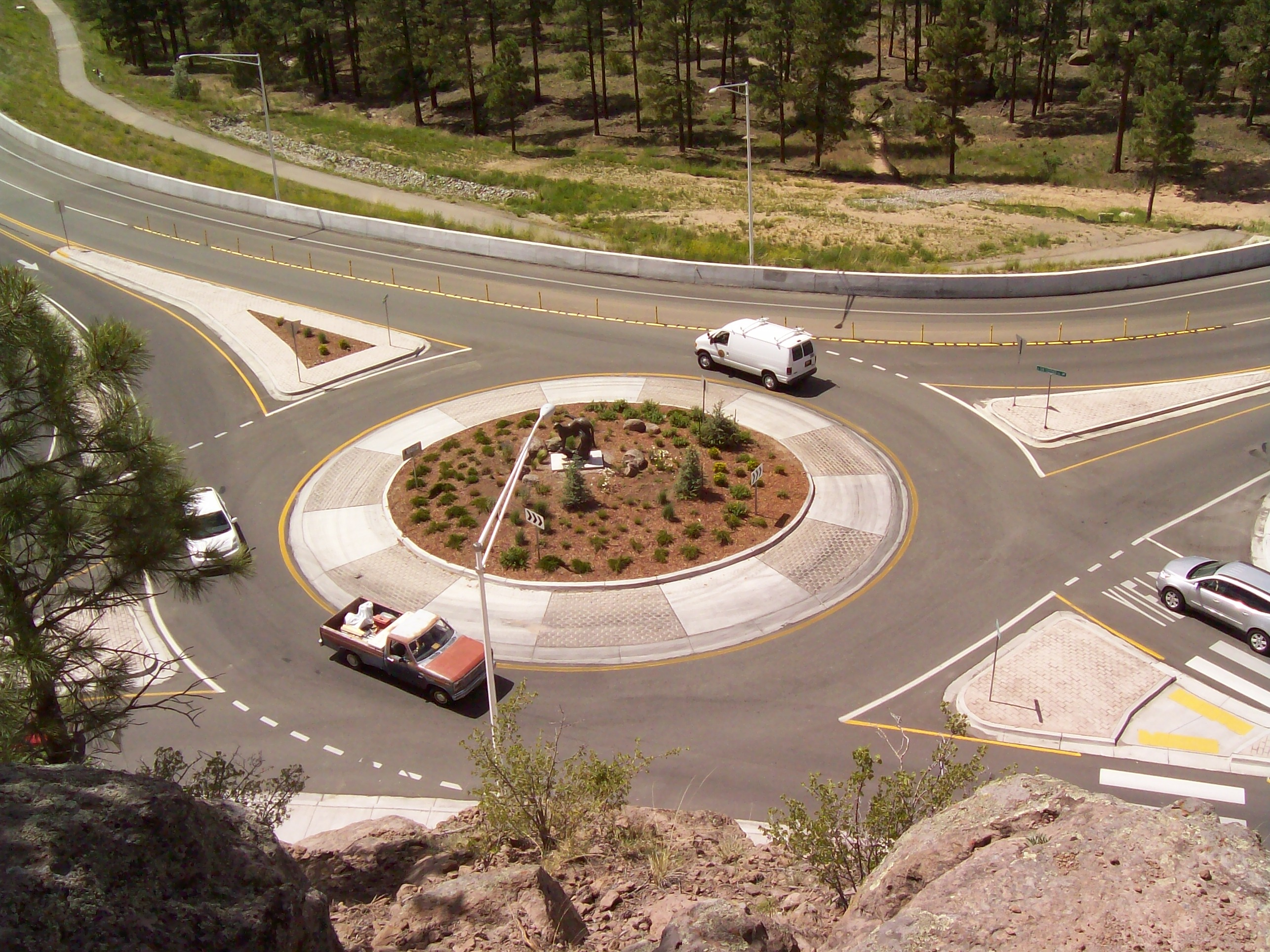
Roundabout in the United States with separated side lanes. Vehicles entering the roundabout give way to vehicles in the roundabout. As of March 2009 the road at upper left carries 10,400 vehicles per weekday.

In the 1980s, roundabouts were regarded fearfully in the US, and met repeated setbacks as a result. Early proposals looked for special “suitable” sites for experiment, engendered strong opposition from road agencies and the public, and consequently had to be abandoned. Among many proposed California sites were Goleta and Santa Barbara (1985), Oxnard (1986), Ojai and Valencia (1988), and several locations in Long Beach.

In May 1986, at his own expense, Ourston brought Frank Blackmore to the United States to speak to all who would listen: at Caltrans District 4 (San Francisco), the Santa Barbara Board of Supervisors, Caltrans District 7 (L.A.), Caltrans Headquarters (Sacramento), and Caltrans District 6 (San Luis Obispo). Earlier that year, Ourston also arranged a visit by Engineering Professor Ragnvald Sagen of Norway, also for the purpose of convincing California road agencies of the efficacy of roundabouts.

In his letter to Blackmore, Ourston pleaded: "In 1941, Sir Winston Churchill asked America to join Britain in a struggle to protect democracy. We joined you and together we triumphed. Now, 45 years later, I am calling upon you to help Dr. Ragnvald Sagen and me with a difficult struggle in which we are both engaged. We are trying to bring the British-style roundabout to the western hemisphere. The fighting is tough, the slogging is slow, and the resistance is stiff. In the spirit of Anglo-American cooperation, will you join us and lend a hand?" (Leif Ourston, letter to Frank Blackmore, March 1986)

The political heat was intense, and no one wanted to go first. Ourston used much of his own savings in the hopes that roundabouts would eventually be accepted in America and engineering work could begin in earnest.

Again quoting Ourston: "To survive the constant rejection emotionally, I expect a stonewall to all appeals, and am grateful whenever I open a little crack and let in a little light." (Leif Ourston, letter to Frank Blackmore, July 1986)

== U.S. roundabouts ==
By 1991, Ourston also began professional collaboration with Barry Crown, eventually bringing him to the U.S. for the same purpose. Among many strategies, he also arranged communications between municipalities in the US and France to further persuade U.S. agencies.

Ourston's efforts gradually convinced enough people that roundabouts could be applied in the U.S., and he built two roundabouts in Nevada in the Summerlin master-planned community in the western Las Vegas valley in 1990, followed by others around the U.S. This allowed Caltrans to confidently convert the Long Beach Traffic Circle to a modern roundabout. These early demonstrations and others elsewhere gradually allowed statistical proof that roundabouts were also safe and effective in North America, paving the way for confident widespread use throughout the U.S. and Canada.
