= Plastic armour =

British World War II stone aggregate ship armour

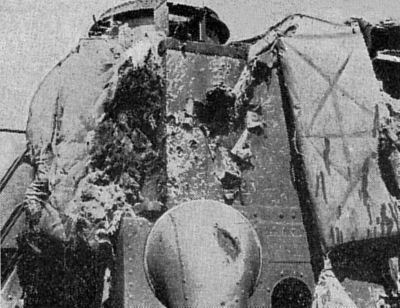
Damaged plastic armour after enemy attack

Plastic armour (also known as plastic protection) was a type of vehicle armour originally developed for merchant ships by Edward Terrell of the British Admiralty in 1940. It consisted of small, evenly sized aggregate in a matrix of bitumen, similar to asphalt concrete. It was typically applied as a casting in situ in a layer about 2 in (51 mm) thick on to existing ship structures made from 1/4 in-thick (6.4 mm) mild steel or formed in equally thick sections on a 1/2 in-thick (13 mm) steel plate for mounting as gun shields and the like. Plastic armour replaced the use of concrete slabs, which although expected to provide protection, were prone to cracking and breaking up when struck by armour-piercing bullets. Plastic armour was effective because the very hard particles would deflect bullets, which would then lodge between the plastic armour and the steel backing plate. Plastic armour could be applied by pouring it into a cavity formed by the steel backing plate and a temporary wooden form. Production of the armour was by road construction firms and was carried out in a similar way to the production of road coverings, the organization of the armouring being carried out by naval officers in key ports.

== Development ==
In August 1939, the British Admiralty had considered the possibility that merchant ships might be attacked by aircraft with machine guns and cannon. No armour plate could be spared to protect the ships' bridges and gun positions, so the Admiralty recommended that ship owners fit concrete paving slabs in layers up to 6 inches (150 mm) thick to protect the vulnerable crew. The Admiralty had done no testing with armour-piercing bullets, and when the fighting started in earnest, it became evident that concrete armour was almost useless against German machine-gun fire. As the fighting in the English Channel intensified in August 1940, casualties rose and the prospect of a collapse in morale threatened.

Edward Terrell was a successful barrister and magistrate with a flair for invention; by 1940, he had registered a number of patents relating to pens, ink bottles, and peeling knives. When war came, he volunteered for the Royal Navy Volunteer Reserve and when he was accepted, he was commissioned as a lieutenant in the Special Branch of the Volunteer Reserve, the highest possible rank permitted by fleet orders under the circumstances.

Terrell was brought into the Admiralty to run an information-gathering section, concerned with the manner in which small ships were attacked by aircraft. Terrell collected reports and gathered a library of film showing attacks on ships. When visiting damaged ships, he found bridges and chartrooms riddled with bullet holes and sections of concrete in shattered pieces. He also saw dried blood. These grim scenes made a deep impression on Terrell.

In August 1940, one of Terrell's staff, Lieutenant-Commander Lane, brought to his attention a report by a shipwright, Lieutenant Hindmarsh. The report had been written in July, about events the previous month during the Dunkirk evacuation. A paddle steamer had been hit by shells and bullets, but with remarkably few casualties. A marginal note read:

I noticed that whenever machine-gun bullets struck the deck, there were no ricochets ... The surface of the deck is covered with a cork-filled mastic substance to aid waterproofing.

Terrell found that the worn-out ship had been heavily caulked with Insulphate, a slightly elastic compound of asphalt filled with small bits of cork. Insulphate was a popular solution to the problem of coping with the flexing of a ship that was old or that was now being used in waters rougher than those for which she was originally designed. Lane suggested that the mastic might have protective properties. Terrell agreed and immediately made an appointment to see the manufacturers, Durastic Bituminous Products Ltd. By 17 August 1940, he had samples for testing.

Just two days after receiving his first samples, Terrell tested them at a rifle range at the Road Research Station, Harmondsworth. The results were disappointing; bullets went straight through the soft material and through a mild steel backing plate. Disappointed, some of the scientists witnessing the tests left. William Glanville, head of the station, stayed and the men performed a few more test shots. In the resulting discussions, Terrell suggested replacing the cork with rock to deflect the hard core of an armour-piercing bullet so that it hit the backing plate at an angle, dispersing its energy so that it would not penetrate.

Terrell recalled an old legal case that he had conducted for the Amalgamated Roadstone Corporation. While studying background technicalities, he had visited Penlee Quarry at Newlyn in Cornwall, where he was told that Penlee granite was the hardest available. Terrell, who owned shares in the company, went on to insist that Penlee granite be used for plastic armour, whatever its material qualities.

Terrell had new targets made to his specifications by Durastic Bitumious Products. The new targets, with a variety of sizes of granite chips and proportions of mastic and limestone, were delivered on 20 August. Testing was performed two days later and supplies of granite started to arrive at the Road Research Station for more trials. Terrell's choice of the Road Research Station for a firing range was convenient, as they had all the necessary experience with dealing with stone and bitumen – though in his memoirs, Terrell insists that the original choice was simply good fortune.

Terrell coined the term "plastic armour" for his invention, partly because it was plastic in the sense of being malleable and ductile while hot, but also because he thought that the term might be confusing to German intelligence, who might assume that the product was made with the synthetic wood plastics then available.

On 27 August, Terrell, Glanville and a Lee drafted a report detailing their efforts and giving a recipe for plastic armour; the entire development cycle had taken just 10 days. The recipe required 55% granite, 38% limestone, and 7% bitumen; it was important that the stone was carefully graded and free from grit. The backing plate was vital; it would usually be 0.25-inch (6.4 mm) thick mild steel. Since this was from what vital parts of a ship's superstructure were made, it was possible to cast plastic armour in situ between existing plates and temporary wooden shuttering, usually to a thickness of 4 inches (100 mm). Where this was not possible, armoured plates could be factory made. Wooden backing could also be used when nonmagnetic protection was needed near the ship's compass. The war had brought road building to a virtual halt, so plenty of suitably qualified workers and machines were available for the task of armouring Britain's ships.

Plastic armour was at first met with resistance from some senior officers. Terrell soon received enthusiastic support from the Admiralty Trade Division, which was responsible for protecting convoys and their ships. To proceed in an orderly manner, the Trade Division needed the approval of the Admiralty's Department of Naval Construction (DNC). Terrell and the chief of the Directorate of Miscellaneous Weapons Development (DMWD), Commander Charles Goodeve, met with representatives of DNC, who rejected plastic armour out of hand. DMWD performed a series of independent tests at the Royal Navy shore establishment HMS Excellent, resulting in a positive report:

There is no doubt that Plastic Armour is very greatly superior to any other non-magnetic material, excluding non-magnetic bullet-proof steel, so far tried ... it is most strongly recommended that the fitting of concrete protection should be discontinued and Plastic Armour fitted in its place.

The report was forwarded to the DNC, but was rejected again. Some within the navy objected to the use of the word armour to describe a mixture derived from road-building materials. The DNC said that it would remove its objections provided the word "armour" was removed from the name of the product. The Trade Division insisted that the term "armour" was important for morale and that at this stage higher authorities decided that the DNC would be bypassed and production would start without their formal approval.

The process and specification was patented secretly under an agreement that the British Crown had full use of the invention. Glanville insisted "in good faith" on his name appearing in the patent; Terrell acquiesced so the armour could be put into use without delay.

Plastic armour was available in large quantities and cost only £12 1/2 per ton – compared with heat-treated armoured plate at about £150 per ton and in short supply (though weight-for-weight somewhat more effective than plastic armour). Plastic armour went into full production in October; facilities were soon in place in every major port involving every major road-building contractor in the country. Word spread abroad to Britain's allies. By the end of the war, plastic armour had been fitted to some 10,000 ships. Plastic armour was even used on the fighting ships of the Royal Navy, although in these cases the Department of Naval Construction insisted on referring to it as "plastic protection".

Development and testing continued. Eventually, the bitumen of the original formulation was replaced by less expensive pitch and the Penlee granite was replaced by flint gravel. Elsewhere in the world, people used whatever stone was available.

Terrell invented the Scorpion, a plastic armoured vehicle apparently similar to the Armadillo armoured fighting vehicle. Also, a semiportable pillbox or strongpoint made of prefabricated panels of plastic armour was made for the Home Guard and was considered as a means of covering the retreat of the commandos at the end of the raid on Dieppe.

Terrell was appointed to the staff of the First Sea Lord and promoted to the temporary rank of commander.

After the war, Terrell and Glanville received a patent for plastic armour, after the invention was disputed by the manufacturers of Insulphate and applied to the Royal Commission on Awards to Inventors for their work on plastic armour. The court hearing lasted for a full week, with the Crown protesting that plastic armour had been developed in the normal course of the men's work. If this had been the case, it would have reduced the size of the award. The court found in favour of Terrell as sole inventor, granting an award of £9,500 in recognition of the usefulness of the invention and the initiative with which it was developed. Terrell, in turn, passed some of the award on to Glanville. (The award was a considerable sum: £9,500 in 1946 is equivalent to £435,000 in 2023.)

== American production ==
In August 1943, American experiments on the general problem of protection against shaped charges began, and by October of that year, a plastic armour much lighter than the steel armour required for the same amount of protection was found. This armour, made by the Flintkote Company, was improved through a series of tests and a modified armour of pure quartz gravel in a mastic of pitch and wood flour was designated HCR2. Tests were also conducted to test plastic armour's ability to protect ships from torpedoes with shaped-charge warheads, but this project was abandoned due to the low probability of these weapons becoming a serious threat and protection of armoured fighting vehicles and concrete fortifications became the priorities.

== Tank protection ==
The original plan for tank protection with plastic armour was to produce HCR2-filled steel panels, small in size to reduce the area damaged by a single projectile, which could be fastened to an M4 Sherman in an emergency. To protect against the largest Panzerfaust, 8-12 tons of plastic protection were required for an M4, while an M26 Pershing's greater base armour meant it required only 7.1 tons of additional protection to equal an M4 with 11.7 tons of plastic protection. This was a 34% increase in weight for an M4, but only a 16% increase for an M26, and the panel for the M26's turret was only 10 3/4 inches thick compared to 13 3/4 inches for the M4. New panels made of welded steel armour, half an inch thick on the sides and three-quarters of an inch thick on the faces, were designed, but their construction was incomplete at the end of World War II. As a result of increasing tank losses to shaped-charge weapons, another type of panel that could enter production in only a few weeks was designed. This new type of panel used 1 1/2-inch mild steel instead of armour steel, and had a two-inch plate of 21ST aluminium alloy backing the face plate for reinforcement. One set of this armour was completed and tested just after the end of World War II and was considered quite satisfactory, although less so than the panels made of armour steel.
