= Panjandrum =

British experimental rocket-propelled explosive cart of WW2

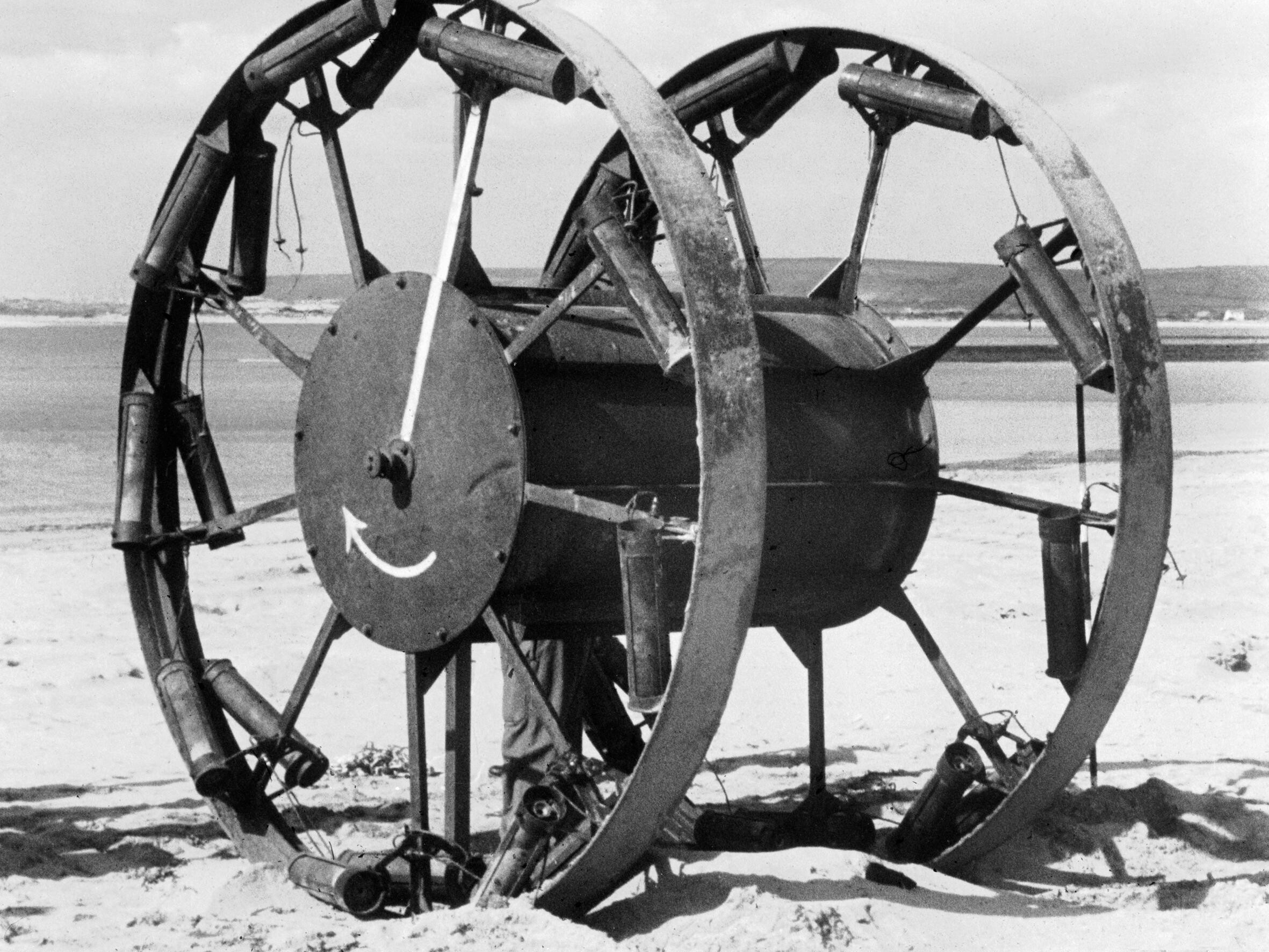
- Type: Rocket-propelled explosive cart
- Place of origin: United Kingdom

Service history
- In service: 1943
- Used by: British Army

Specifications
- Mass: 4,000-pound (1,800 kg)
- Diameter: 10 ft (3.0 m) (wheels)
- Warhead: Unknown
- Warhead weight: 1 long ton (1,000 kg)
- Maximum speed: 60 mph (100 km/h)
- Guidance system: Unguided

Panjandrum, also known as The Great Panjandrum, was a massive, rocket-propelled, explosive-laden cart designed by the British military during World War II. It was one of a number of highly experimental projects, including Hajile and the Hedgehog, that were developed by the Admiralty's Directorate of Miscellaneous Weapons Development (DMWD) in the final years of the war. The Panjandrum was never used in battle.

== Development ==
The DMWD had been asked to come up with a device capable of penetrating the 10 ft (3.0 m) high, 7 ft (2.1 m) thick concrete defences that made up part of the Atlantic Wall. It was further specified that the device should be capable of being launched from landing craft since it was highly likely that the beaches in front of the defences would act as a killing ground for anyone attempting to deliver the device by hand. Sub-Lieutenant Nevil Shute calculated that over 1 long ton (1,000 kg) of explosives would be needed in order to create a tank-sized breach in such a wall. The delivery method for such a quantity of explosives posed a significant problem, and one of the concepts discussed ultimately resulted in the construction of the prototype "Great Panjandrum". The proposed device comprised a steel drum filled with explosives, suspended between a pair of steel-treaded wooden wheels. The wheels were 1 ft (0.30 m) wide, and 10 ft (3.0 m) in diameter. The weapon would be propelled by sets of cordite rockets attached to each wheel. The designers predicted that, with a full 4,000-pound (1,800 kg) load, Panjandrum would achieve speeds of around 60 mph (100 km/h), with enough momentum to simply crash through any obstacles between its launch point and target. The name "Great Panjandrum" was chosen by Shute as a reference to Samuel Foote's famous extempore nonsense paragraph (though Foote's term was actually "the grand Panjandrum"), and in particular to its closing line "till the gunpowder ran out at the heels of their boots".

== Testing ==
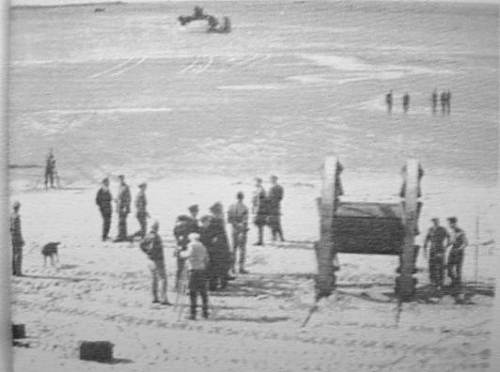
Panjandrum at Westward Ho!, Devon

The prototype was secretly constructed at Leytonstone and transported by night to the testing grounds at Westward Ho!, Devon. However, once there, the secrecy surrounding the project broke down, as the beach chosen as a test site was also a popular destination for holidaymakers; from the first test on 7 September 1943 onwards, every trial was witnessed by large citizen audiences despite the DMWD's warnings concerning the safety of the weapon. Since nothing remotely resembling the Panjandrum had ever been constructed before, the trials began with trepidation—only a handful of cordite rockets were attached to the wheels, and the payload was simulated by an equivalent weight of sand. When Shute gave the signal, the rockets were ignited and the Panjandrum catapulted itself forward, out of the landing craft used as a launchpad, and a fair distance up the beach before a number of the rockets on the right wheel failed and the weapon careened off course. Several further attempts were made with more and more rockets, but on every occasion the Panjandrum lost control before reaching the end of the beach.

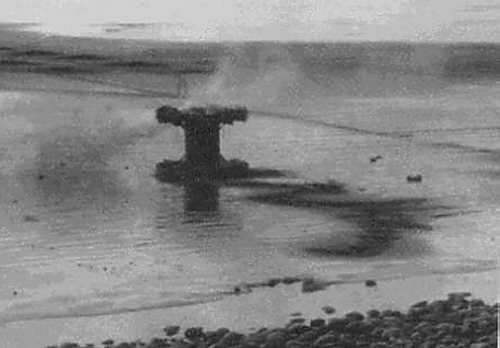
Panjandrum after an unsuccessful test

After tinkering with the project for a further three weeks, the Department returned to the beach. Panjandrum was now equipped with over seventy cordite rockets and a stabilising third wheel. When launched, it hurtled towards the coast, skimming the beach before turning back out to sea. A number of the 20 lb (9.1 kg) rockets detached and whipped wildly above the heads of the gathered audience or exploded underwater. Despite these failures, Shute and his team persevered, removing the third wheel and attaching steel cables to the remaining two wheels as a basic form of steering. Panjandrum proved to be too powerful however, snapping the cables and whipping them back across the beach when they were used. More weeks were spent testing every conceivable variable from thicker cables to heavier rocket-clamps without success before the DMWD received notification that the weapon was only required to be consistently able to travel in the general direction of the enemy. With some degree of confidence, a final trial was scheduled to be performed in January 1944, in front of a number of Navy officials and scientists, as well as an official photographer.

== The final test ==
The day of the test was described in detail by Brian Johnson, for the 1977 BBC documentary The Secret War:

At first all went well. Panjandrum rolled into the sea and began to head for the shore, the Brass Hats watching through binoculars from the top of a pebble ridge [...] Then a clamp gave: first one, then two more rockets broke free: Panjandrum began to lurch ominously. It hit a line of small craters in the sand and began to turn to starboard, careering towards Klemantaski, who, viewing events through a telescopic lens, misjudged the distance and continued filming. Hearing the approaching roar he looked up from his viewfinder to see Panjandrum, shedding live rockets in all directions, heading straight for him. As he ran for his life, he glimpsed the assembled admirals and generals diving for cover behind the pebble ridge into barbed-wire entanglements. Panjandrum was now heading back to the sea but crashed on to the sand where it disintegrated in violent explosions, rockets tearing across the beach at great speed.

Given the results of the trial, it is perhaps not surprising that the project was scrapped almost immediately over safety concerns. However, it has since been suggested that the entire project was a hoax devised as part of Operation Fortitude, to convince the Germans that plans were being developed to attack the heavily fortified defences surrounding the Pas-de-Calais rather than the less-defended Normandy coastline.

== Reconstruction ==
On the occasion of the 65th anniversary of the Normandy Landings a replica was constructed and set off on the original beach in Devon. The wheel, commissioned by the local Appledore Book Festival, was 6 ft (1.8 m) high and 3 ft (0.9 m) wide and loaded with fireworks fitted by Skyburst of Bristol, instead of explosives; it was expected to travel 500 metres at a speed of up to 24 km/h. In the event, it travelled in a straight line, but only for 50 metres. The event was recorded on video.

Neil A Downie described the science and fabrication of a 'Turbo Panjandrum', a Panjandrum driven by 2 or more high power electric motors with propellers attached to a pair of large bicycle wheels. Turbo Panjandrums made by different teams have been raced against each other.

== In popular culture ==
- Although not called Panjandrum, a similar device was the focus of an episode of the comedy Dad's Army, "Round and Round Went the Great Big Wheel", although it was operated by remote control and for comic purposes it was more manoeuvrable and remained active far longer.
- The Panjandrum tests are featured in the film Overlord by Stuart Cooper.
- Mentioned extensively in the "Thursday Next" series, by Jasper Fforde.
- The Panjandrum was mentioned in The Right Stuff by Tom Wolfe.
- The term "Panjandrum" is used frequently in Anathem by Neal Stephenson.
- In the anime feature film Girls und Panzer der Film, the Panjandrum is mentioned when the Ōarai Rabbit Team shoots a Ferris wheel off its mountings, sending it rolling down a slope in order to break up an enemy formation.
- The invention was explored in the third episode of the Netflix series White Rabbit Project as the second contender investigated by host Grant Imahara.
- Adam Savage devoted an episode of his series Savage Builds to studying and unsuccessfully attempting to re-create a Panjandrum.
- In Japan, the Panjundrum is famous for “the British side of military projects”, which includes Nelson-class battleship, Habakkuk aircraft carrier, and the Archer self-propelled anti-tank gun.
- The Panjandrum is referenced as having wounded England in an episode of Axis Powers Hetalia.
- A traction town by the name "Panjandrum", bearing similarity to the experimental weapon system, is featured in The Illustrated World of Mortal Engines by Philip Reeve.

== See also ==
- Hobart's Funnies
