= Edward Terrell =

British politician and inventor (1902–1979)

Edward Terrell OBE QC JP
- Born: 1902
- Died: 13 November 1979 (aged 76–77)
- Education: University of London
- Occupations: Barrister, magistrate, inventor
- Political party: Liberal Party (UK)
- Military career
- Allegiance: United Kingdom
- Branch: Royal Navy
- Conflicts: World War II

Edward Terrell OBE (1902–1979) was a British Liberal politician, barrister and magistrate with a flair for invention; by 1940 he had registered a number of patents relating to pens, ink bottles and peeling knives. When war came, he volunteered for the Royal Navy Volunteer Reserve (RNVR) and was commissioned as a lieutenant in the Special Branch of the Volunteer Reserve to run an information section.

== Early life ==
He was the son of Thomas Terrell KC, who was a Liberal Member of Parliament. He graduated at London University and was called to the Bar by Gray's Inn in 1924.

He first stood for Parliament at the 1929 General Election, when he was Liberal candidate for Watford. He came second, ahead of the Labour candidate. He did not contest the 1931 General Election but stood as Liberal candidate for Lambeth North at the 1935 General Election when he again finished second.

From 1935 he was Recorder of Newbury.

While still a civilian Terrell had outlined a scheme to the Admiralty suggesting that bases and units would need an attached lawyer to deal with the many personal legal problems that would arise with mass call-ups, and at the same time had applied to the commissioning board of the RNVR. Shortly afterwards he was approached by Charles F. Goodeve, on the staff of Sir James Somerville, to run an information section. His selection was based on his scientific background and to some extent that his father (a KC) had practised in patent law. As a result, he joined the RNVR as a lieutenant.

== World War II ==
He was now part of what Terrell described as "private army" for Goodeve to develop naval weapons. It was nominally the staff of the "Inspector of Anti-Aircraft Weapons and Devices" but with Sommerville's departure to the Mediterranean fleet this post would be vacant, and the group (consisting of Terrell, Goodeve, the aeronautical engineer Nevil Shute Norway, the scientist F. D. Richardson, and a regular naval officer Millar) would have been disbanded but Goodeve and Millar made an arrangement with the Trade Division which was responsible for protection of the merchant fleet.

As such Terrell was in charge of collecting information on the German methods of attacking the merchant ships.

He developed plastic armour for which he received an award from the Royal Commission on Awards to Inventors. (Note: Although the Commission decided that Terrell was the "sole inventor", he passed a proportion of the award to Dr Glanville, who had worked with him on it.)

When asked for films of German aircraft attacking merchant ships as propaganda for American production of Oerlikon guns, Terrell proposed a more substantial story using genuine mariners which received immediate approval from Sir Bruce Fraser, Controller of the Navy. The resulting film, The Gun, included the American commentator Edward R. Murrow. The film used some of Terrell's collected footage of attacks on real ships.

Recognised for his ingenuity, energy and tact, Terrell was appointed to the staff of the First Sea Lord as an assistant to Vice-Admiral Cecil Vivian Usborne. He was promoted with exceptional rapidity to the temporary rank of commander. Usborne's task was to develop weapons and techniques against U-boats, and he and Terrell formed a team of two. Their first success was introducing a tactical table to train and practise anti-submarine tactics at Western Approaches Command.

After investigating the captured U-boat U-570, they determined that if the hull was penetrated by 20 mm shells, the crew would be unable to stop the flooding. As a result, patrol craft were armed with Hispano 20 mm cannon.

At the Directorate of Miscellaneous Weapons Development he helped with the development of a more powerful version of the Hedgehog anti-submarine weapon called Squid. He developed techniques for reducing the conspicuous smoke given off by ships, and he worked on a bunker-busting rocket-powered bomb, the Disney bomb.

Terrell enjoyed a close relationship with Millis Jefferis of MD1, and he once defended Jefferis in court when he had been found to be driving while uninsured. In 1947 he represented Robert Stuart Macrae, also of MD1, at the Royal Commission on Awards to Inventors, who was being considered for his work on the sticky bomb and other inventions.

== Postwar life ==
Terrell returned to the legal profession after the war, taking silk and became a Recorder of the Crown Court. In 1958, be published a book on his wartime experiences.

Terrell died on 13 November 1979 at the age of 77. Some of his private papers related to his wartime work are held by the Imperial War Museum.
