= Transport Research Laboratory =

British consultancy company

Coordinates: 51°22′54″N 0°46′56″W

TRL Limited
- Trade name: TRL
- Type: Private company limited by guarantee
- Industry: Automotive transport, roads, engineering, insurance, urban environment, rail travel, motorsport
- Predecessors: Road Research Laboratory (RRL); Transport and Road Research Laboratory (TRRL)
- Founded: 1933; 93 years ago, in Harmondsworth, West Drayton, Greater London
- Headquarters: Wokingham, Berkshire
- Area served: Worldwide
- Key people: David Sharrat (Interim Chief Executive Officer)
- Products: Various transport related items, including software, legform impactors, safety certification rigs
- Services: Engineering, research, consultancy, certification, software development
- Owner: Transport Research Foundation
- Number of employees: approx. 320
- Subsidiaries: TRL Academy; TRL Software
- Website: www.trl.co.uk

TRL Limited, trading as TRL (formerly Transport Research Laboratory) is an independent private company offering a transport consultancy and research service to the public and private sector. Originally established in 1933 by the UK Government as the Road Research Laboratory (RRL), it was privatised in 1996. Its motto or tagline is 'The Future of Transport'.

== History ==
TRL was originally established in 1933 by the UK Government as the Road Research Laboratory (RRL) under the Department of Scientific and Industrial Research (DSIR), and later became the Transport and Road Research Laboratory (TRRL) in 1972.

During the Second World War, the Laboratory contributed to the war effort. Among its contributions, under William Glanville, were research that aided the development of plastic armour, the bouncing bomb and the Disney bomb.

During governmental reorganisation in the 1970s, the TRRL moved from the Department of Trade and Industry (DTI) to the Department of the Environment (DoE).

At the TRRL, Frank Blackmore developed the mini-roundabout and its associated 'priority rule', which was adopted in 1975.

With the encouragement of the UK Department of Transport, TRRL was instrumental in promoting cooperation with other European laboratories. In 1989, TRRL's initiative to create a Forum of European National Highway Research Laboratories led to its hosting of the inaugural meeting.

It became an executive agency of the UK Department for Transport (DfT) in 1992, and changed its name to the Transport Research Laboratory (TRL).

It was privatised in 1996, though earlier plans in 1994 for a proposed privatisation were criticised at the time, notably by former Transport Minister Barbara Castle.

== Operations ==
TRL is based in Crowthorne, Berkshire, with additional offices in Edinburgh and Birmingham.

TRL's key areas of work include road, network and vehicle safety; traffic management; planning and control; investigations and risk management; transport infrastructure; and environmental assessment, including work on climate change, noise and air pollution.

=== Software ===
TRL has produced industry-standard software including Junctions, TRANSYT, SCOOT 7 and UTC, Powered by SCOOT 7.

== Site redevelopment ==
The extensive Crowthorne site has been substantially scaled back, with many of the original buildings disused, creating an opportunity for redevelopment. In 2012, Bracknell Council identified the original site as a strategic area, suitable for a new mini-town of 1,000 homes.

== Corporate affairs ==
To maintain its commercial independence and impartiality, TRL is owned by the Transport Research Foundation (TRF), a non-profit distributing foundation, overseen by 80 sector members from the transport industry. The TRF is classed as a non-profit distributing organisation (NPDO), a form of business structure where all profits are reinvested in services or business growth, rather than being distributed to shareholders. TRL's profits are invested in its own research programmes, selected by the TRF to enhance knowledge in critical areas such as safety, environmental impact and sustainable development.

== See also ==
- Vehicle Certification Agency
- Type approval
- United Kingdom driving test
- Zebra crossing
- MIRA Ltd.
- SHARP (helmet ratings)
- Slough experiment
