= Retrorocket =

Rocket engine providing negative thrust used to slow the motion of an aerospace vehicle

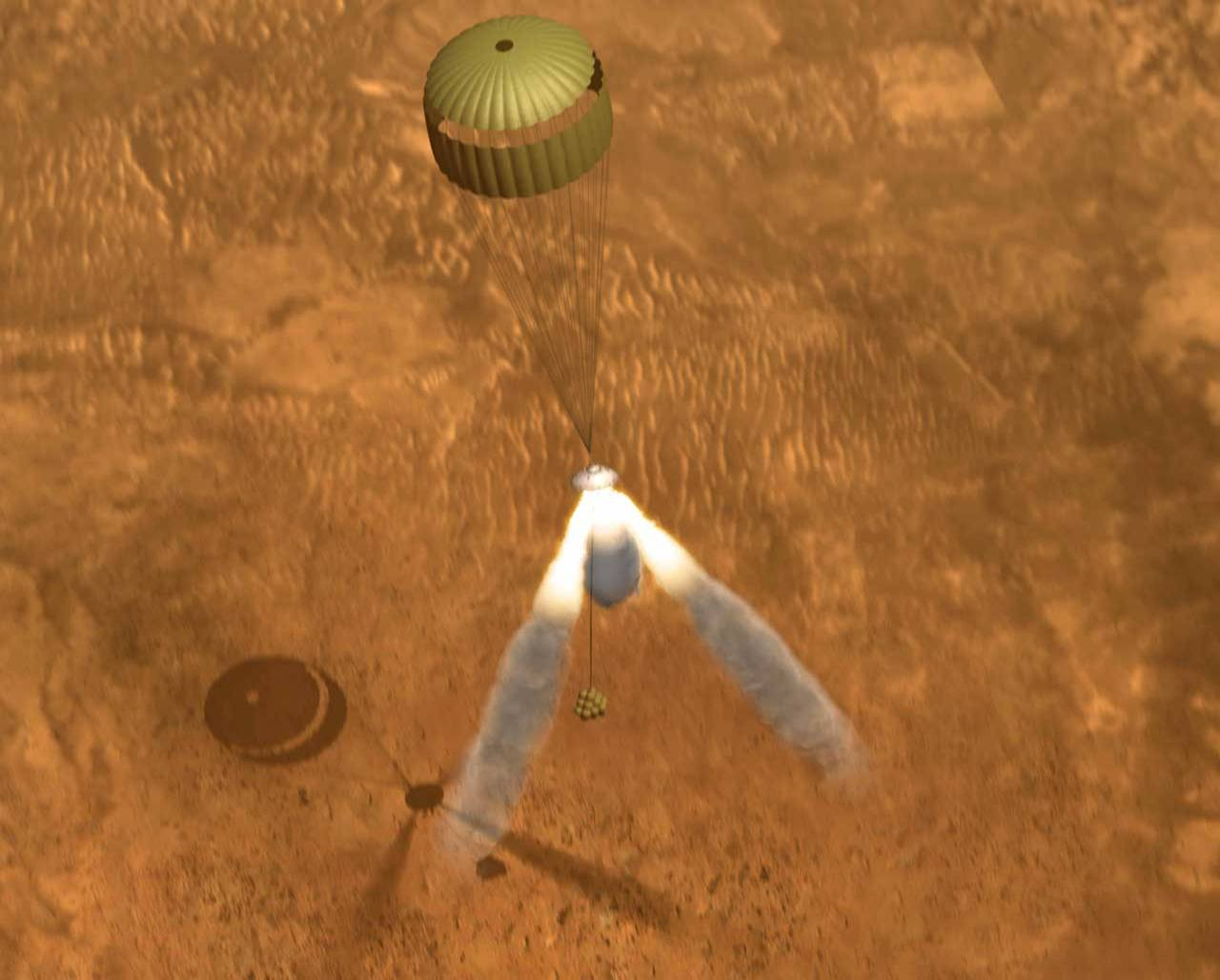
Descent of a Martian lander halted by retrorockets (computer-generated impression)

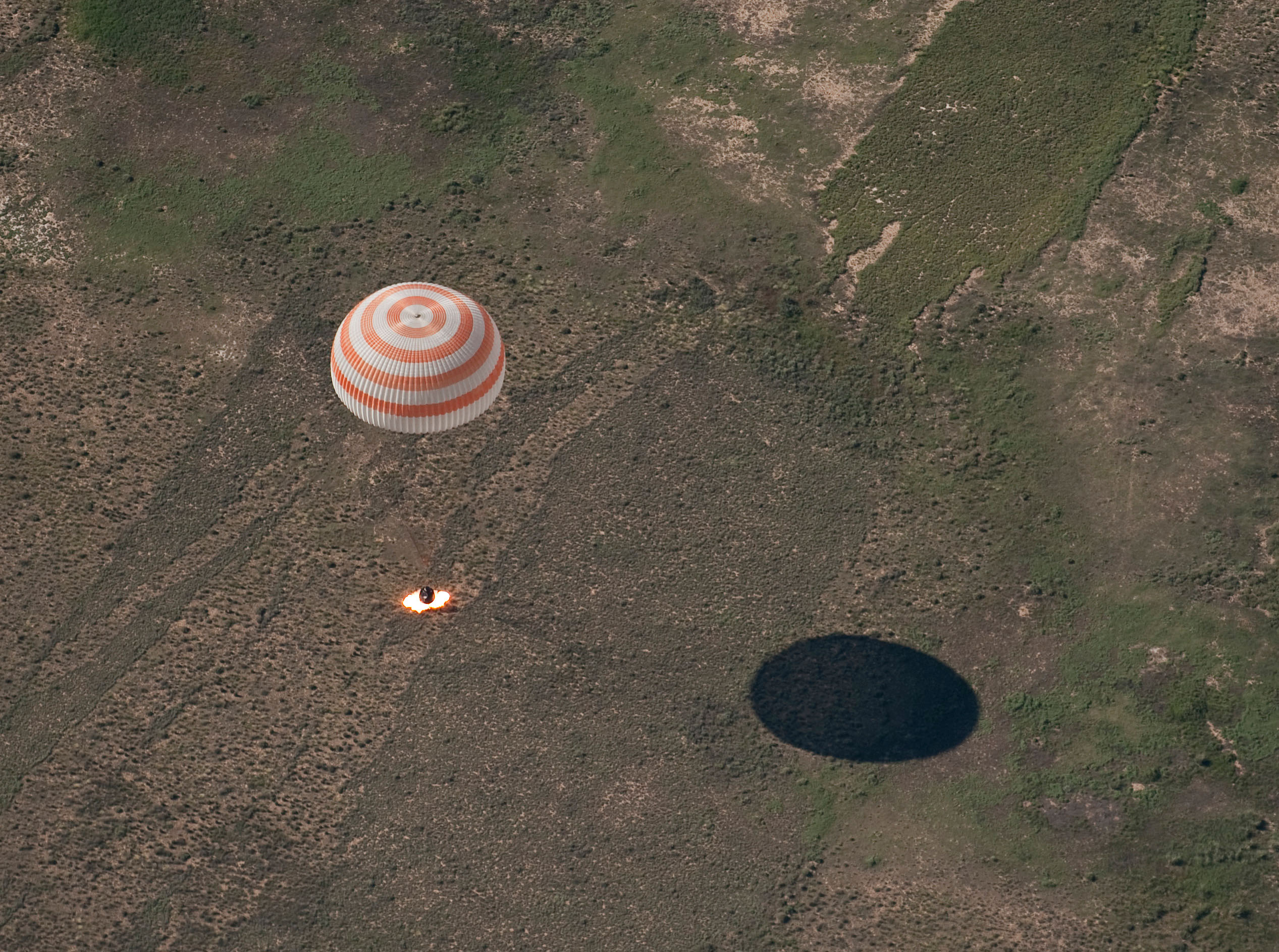
Soyuz space capsule retro-rockets cushion the landing impact

A retrorocket (short for retrograde rocket) is a rocket engine providing thrust opposing the motion of a vehicle, thereby causing it to decelerate. They have mostly been used in spacecraft, with more limited use in short-runway aircraft landing. New uses are emerging since 2010 for retro-thrust rockets in reusable launch systems.

== History ==
Rockets were fitted to the nose of some models of the DFS 230, a World War II German Military glider. This enabled the aircraft to land in more confined areas than would otherwise be possible during an airborne assault.

Another World War II development was the British Hajile project, initiated by the British Admiralty's Directorate of Miscellaneous Weapons Development. Originally a request from the British Army as a method to drop heavy equipment or vehicles from aircraft flying at high speeds and altitudes, the project turned out to be a disaster and was largely forgotten after the war. Although some of the tests turned out to be successful, Hajile was too unpredictable to be used in conventional warfare, and by the time the war drew to a close, with no chance to put the project into action, it was shelved. Later Soviet experiments used this technique, braking large air-dropped cargos after a parachute descent.

== Uses ==
=== Deorbit maneuvers ===
When a spacecraft in orbit is slowed sufficiently, its altitude decreases to the point at which aerodynamic forces begin to rapidly slow the motion of the vehicle, and it returns to the ground. Without retrorockets, spacecraft would remain in orbit until their orbits naturally slow, and reenter the atmosphere at a much later date; in the case of crewed flights, long after life support systems have been expended. Therefore, it is critical that spacecraft have extremely reliable retrorockets.

==== Project Mercury ====
Due to the high reliability demanded by de-orbiting retrorockets, Mercury spacecraft used a trio of solid fuel, 1000 lbf (4.5 kN) thrust retrorockets that fired for 10 seconds each, strapped to the heat shield on the bottom of the spacecraft. One was sufficient to return the spacecraft to Earth if the other two failed.

==== Project Gemini ====
Gemini used four rockets, each 2,500 pounds-force (11 kN), burning for 5.5 seconds in sequence, with a slight overlap. These were mounted in the retrograde section of the adapter module, located just behind the capsule's heat shield.

==== Apollo program ====
For lunar flights, the Apollo command and service module did not require retrorockets to return the command module to Earth, as the flight path took the module through the atmosphere, using atmospheric drag to reduce velocity. The test flights in Earth orbit required retrograde propulsion, which was provided by the large Service Propulsion Engine on the service module. The same engine was used as a retrorocket to slow the spacecraft for lunar orbit insertion. The Apollo Lunar Module used its descent stage engine to drop from orbit and land on the Moon.

==== Space Shuttle program ====
The Space Shuttle Orbital Maneuvering System provided the vehicle with a pair of powerful liquid-fueled rockets for both reentry and orbital maneuvering. One was sufficient for a successful reentry, and if both systems were to fail, the reaction control system could slow the vehicle enough for reentry.

=== Launch vehicle staging ===
To ensure clean separation and prevent contact, multistage rockets such as the Titan II, Saturn I, Saturn IB, and Saturn V may have small retrorockets on lower stages, which ignite upon stage separation. For example, they were used to back the S-IC and S-II stages off from the rest of the vehicle after their respective shutdowns during the Saturn V's launch to Earth orbit. Meanwhile, the succeeding stage may have posigrade ullage rockets, both to aid separation and ensure good starting of liquid-fuel engines.

=== Landers ===
Retrorockets are also used in landing spacecraft on other astronomical bodies, such as the Moon and Mars, as well as enabling a spacecraft to enter an orbit around such a body, when otherwise it would scoot past and off into space again. As pointed out above (in connection with Project Apollo) the main rocket on a spacecraft can be re-oriented to serve as a retrorocket. The Soyuz capsule uses small rockets for the last phase of landing.

=== Reusable launch systems ===
New uses for retro-thrust rockets emerged since 2010 for reusable launch systems. After second stage separation, the first stage of SpaceX's Falcon 9 and Falcon Heavy rockets uses one to three of the main engines in order to decelerate for propulsive landing. The first stage is then recovered, refurbished and prepared for the next flight. The boosters of other orbital rockets are routinely destroyed after a single use by atmospheric reentry and high-speed impact in the ocean. Companies like Blue Origin with their New Glenn, Link Space with their New Line 1 and national projects like the European Commission's RETALT project and the China National Space Administration's Long March 8 are also pursuing retro-thrust re-entry for reusable boosters.

New Shepard is a reusable single-stage suborbital rocket where the booster uses its main engine to land again after a flight. The capsule slows its descent with parachutes and uses retrorockets to slow down just before reaching the ground.

SpaceX's Starship launch vehicle recovers its Super Heavy booster in a similar manner to Falcon 9, lighting thirteen engines, before shutting down ten of these engines for the final descent. The second stage, after reentry, lights its three inner engines and descends to either a splashdown or a catch.

=== Operation Credible Sport ===
Operation Credible Sport, a plan put forward by the US government in 1979 to rescue the hostages in Iran resulted in the construction of two modified Lockheed C-130 Hercules, designated YMC-130H, which featured retro-rockets to allow it to perform extremely short landings. As part of the plan, these aircraft would land in the Shahid Shiroudi Stadium near the US Embassy in Tehran and use the retrorockets to come to a stop. One aircraft was destroyed in a crash during a test flight without any fatalities, and the plan was scrapped later that year.
