= FEHRL =

International organisation

The Forum of European National Highway Research Laboratories (FEHRL) was created in 1989 as an international organisation. In 2000, it became an association international sans but lucratif (AiSBL) or International association without lucrative purpose.

It currently includes 30 members from European countries as well as international affiliates from South Africa, Australia and Israel.

In French, the organisation is/was known as Forum des Laboratoires nationaux Europeens de Recherche Routiere (FLERR).

== Purpose ==
Through research collaboration, the statutory objectives of FEHRL are:

- To provide scientific input to Europe and national government policy on highway engineering and road transport matters.
- To create and maintain an efficient and safe road network in Europe.
- To increase innovation in European road construction and road-using industries.
- To improve the energy efficiency of highway engineering and operations
- To protect the environment and improve quality of life.

== Events ==
FEHRL holds an infrastructure research meeting every two years.

== Membership ==
Members are national institutes nominated by their respective national road administration or ministry. Full members are from European countries according to the United Nations geoscheme for Europe classification or candidates for European Union membership. Associates come from non-European countries with S&T agreements with the EU. FEHRL National Groups are created in several countries to widen the cooperation with academia and other organisations

Current membership is;

- ANAS, Italy
- AIT, Austria
- BASt, Germany
- BRRC, Belgium
- CDV, Czech Republic
- CEDEX, Spain
- CESTRIN, Romania
- CIRTNENS, Bulgaria
- DRD, Denmark
- IBDiM, Poland
- ICERA, Iceland
- IFSTTAR, France
- FCEZG, Croatia
- IP, Serbia
- KEDE, Greece
- KTI, Hungary
- LVCELI, Latvia
- EPFL, Switzerland
- LNEC, Portugal
- RRI, Lithuania
- PCH, Luxemburg
- NPRA, Norway
- NRA, Ireland
- RWS, Netherlands
- TECER, Estonia
- TRL, UK
- VTI, Sweden
- VUD, Slovakia
- ZAG, Slovenia
- DerzhdorNDI, Ukraine

Associates are;

- ARRB, Australia
- CSIR, South Africa
- INRC, Israel

Former associates are;

- Federal Highway Administration, United States
