= Hajile =

British military experiment

Hajile (Elijah Backwards) was an experimental project developed by the British Admiralty's Directorate of Miscellaneous Weapons Development (DMWD) during the final years of Second World War for slowing the landing of air-dropped supplies with retrorockets.

== Development ==
The project was initiated by a request from the Army for a method of dropping heavy equipment and vehicles from aircraft at high speed, retaining the materiel's terminal velocity for as long as possible in order to minimise drift and damage from anti-aircraft gun batteries. It was further required that the materiel suffer only minimal or no damage from landing, and once dropped be ready to deploy within minutes.

The high falling speed ruled out parachutes, so the DMWD came up with the idea of loading the drops onto a platform surrounded with cordite rockets. These would fire at the last instant to decelerate the materiel to a safe landing speed. The initial test produced the project's codename; as the rockets' exhaust engulfed the apparatus in a plume of smoke and fire, an attending officer, Captain G. O. C. "Jock" Davies, remarked "Look at it! It's Elijah in reverse", referring to the biblical prophet's ascension to Heaven in a "chariot of fire".

== Testing ==
=== Initial tests ===
Once testing began, a number of problems became apparent. The most immediate was that of how to get the rockets to fire at exactly the right instant. Too early and the platform would pick up enough speed again to cause damage to the load. Too late and the deceleration would be ineffective. The solution settled upon was a plumb-bob, which would dangle below the platform and activate the rockets when it hit the ground. However, the implementation of this idea was complicated by the fact that the weight of the plumb-bob would have to be carefully calibrated, heavy enough not to be blown back into the underside of the platform by the extreme upward winds during the fall, yet still sensitive enough to react immediately on hitting "fuzzy" terrain such as heather or long grass.

The earliest tests were made by simply dropping a concrete block from a tall crane (surviving film was shown in the BBC documentary series "The Secret War" in 1978). The first two tests used insufficient rocket fuel, resulting in the concrete block embedding itself firmly into the ground. On the third and final test the technicians filled the rockets with too much fuel, and the block launched itself several dozen feet back into the air again before plummeting to the ground.

A prototype device was constructed for use over water, since the relatively flat and smooth surface of the water would work as an idealised ground-target and with luck the rig wouldn't sustain any damage from the fall. The weight for the plumb-bob was worked out experimentally, and so the first full-scale tests began. A large concrete block was strapped to the top of the Hajile platform, and the rig loaded into a Lancaster bomber. After a number of attempts to drop the device ended with hits too far from shore to capture on film, the bomber's crew were instructed to aim as close to the testing facility as possible from a height of 2,000 ft (610 m). Gerald Pawle, a member of the DMWD at the time, recalls (Pawle 1972: 173):

As [Hajile] came screaming through the air the watchers on the pier gazed open-mouthed. Then, suddenly realizing that it was going to score a direct hit, every one started running for dear life down the long plank roadway. The concrete "bomb" landed squarely on the roof of D.M.W.D.'s engineering shop. It sheared through a massive steel joist and then demolished the covered way leading to the steamer jetty. Happily there were no casualties, though the Wren cooks preparing lunch a few feet from the wrecked shelter thought the end of the world had come.

On further testing, the initial four-rocket design proved slightly ineffective. The addition of another four rockets spaced evenly around the platform increased the deceleration enough to bring the block to a complete stop a few feet above the water, and Hajile quietly sank beneath the surface rather than thunderously crashing into the water as it had done while using the four-rocket design.

=== Refinement ===
The DMWD attempted to procure a number of jeeps to load onto Hajile for testing the prototype over land, but it proved difficult to convince the Royal Navy to provide working vehicles to jettison from a plane at 2,000 ft (610 m) strapped to an experimental, and potentially explosive, device. Eventually two jeeps were provided by the United States Navy and trials began in earnest. The first test was a spectacular failure, as snowfall on the day dampened the rocket fuses. The rockets didn't fire and the whole rig crashed to the ground slowed only by a small pilot parachute, hitting the ground at around 40 ft/s (12 m/s) and causing extensive damage to the jeep. Hajile underwent a further two weeks of tinkering before another test was performed. This time the rockets fired successfully and when the smoke cleared, the jeep was relatively intact – but had ended up upside-down, with the platform's rockets pointed skyward.

Further testing showed Hajile to be incredibly unreliable: Rockets on some tests misfired and sent the platform into a spin, while on others the weight of the load was misjudged and the platform shot back up into the air for a distance before crashing back to ground with enough force to tear the fittings apart.

One of the last times the rockets on the rig fired was on the morning of the Normandy landings. Hajile was on the ground surrounded by its crew, when an electrician, unaware the device was live, began to test the wiring – and accidentally connected the firing circuit. All eight rockets immediately fired and the platform shot forty feet into the air before lurching sideways and crashing back to earth, injuring a number of the crew and blinding one for several days.

== Aftermath ==
The testing of Hajile ran on long enough that the device was still not working reliably by the time the war drew to a close, and with no chance to put the project into action, it was shelved. The dissolution of the DMWD following the war led to the shelving becoming permanent. As with many such research projects the details of Hajile were kept secret for many years, and very little interest was aroused once the documents describing the project became public.

== See also ==
- Retrorocket
- Soviet air drop technique similar to Hajile
- Curiosity descent stage
