= Structure of the rail industry in the United Kingdom =

There are effectively two separate mainline railway systems in the United Kingdom – the Great Britain system and the Northern Ireland system, which are regulated and operated separately, and are constituted under separate pieces of United Kingdom legislation.

== Great Britain ==
Railways in Great Britain are run under a structure established by the Railways Act 1993 (as amended), which provided for the break-up of the former vertically integrated state railway, the British Railways Board, and the transfer of its operations into the private sector. The Secretary of State for Transport has overall responsibility for the railways within the UK Government.

The railway track and infrastructure is owned and operated by Network Rail, which is regulated by the Office of Rail & Road (ORR).

In Great Britain, passenger trains are run under either franchises from the Department for Transport, or on an open access basis; which means their operators have no contract with government. Freight train operators have no contracts with government, and rely on the competitiveness and attractiveness of their product and services to maintain and increase their market shares.

Rolling stock is primarily owned by rolling stock leasing companies (ROSCOs).

In 2006, using powers in the Railways Act 2005, the Department for Transport took over most of the functions of the Strategic Rail Authority. The DfT now itself runs competitions for the award of passenger rail franchises, and, once awarded, monitors and enforces the contracts with the private sector franchisees. Franchises specify the passenger rail services which are to be run, and the quality and other conditions (for example, the cleanliness of trains, station facilities and opening hours, the punctuality and reliability of trains) which the operators have to meet. Some franchises receive subsidy from the DfT for doing so, and some are cash-positive, which means that the franchisee pays the DfT for the contract. Some franchises start life as subsidised and, over the tenure of their franchise period, move to being cash-positive.

The other regulatory authority for the privatised railway is the ORR, which, following the Railways Act 2005, is the combined economic and safety regulator. It replaced the Rail Regulator on 5 July 2004.

== Northern Ireland ==
Railways in Northern Ireland are a devolved matter. The Northern Ireland Minister for Regional Development has responsibility for railways in Northern Ireland. Even during direct rule, a Minister of State at the Northern Ireland Office has always had responsibility for railways in Northern Ireland, and not the Secretary of State for Transport.

The structure of the railway industry in Northern Ireland is governed by the Transport Act 1967 (Northern Ireland), an Act of the former Parliament of Northern Ireland that still applies. This established a statutory corporation, the Northern Ireland Transport Holding Company - which trades under the brand name Translink - whose members are appointed by the Minister for Regional Development. The corporation has established a wholly owned subsidiary, Northern Ireland Railways Company Limited - which trades as NI Railways - to carry out its functions relating to railways.

Unlike in Great Britain, where different companies run the network, provide rolling stock, and operate trains, NI Railways carries out all these activities itself in Northern Ireland, and is thus a vertically integrated railway, rather than merely a train operating company. The only exception is the Dublin to Belfast railway line, where services are operated jointly with Iarnród Éireann, the nationalised railway company in the Republic of Ireland, under the brand name Enterprise.

== See also ==
- History of rail transport in Great Britain
- British Rail
- Overview of the rail industry
