= The Secret War (TV series) =

1977 English TV series

- Genre: Documentary
- Written by: Brian Johnson; Dominic Flessati; John Groom
- Starring: R. V. Jones
- Narrated by: William Woollard
- Country of origin: England
- Original language: English
- No. of seasons: 1
- No. of episodes: 6

Production
- Producers: Brian Johnson; Dominic Flessati; John Groom
- Running time: 50 min.
- Production companies: BBC; Imperial War Museum (IWM)

Original release
- Release: January 5 – February 9, 1977

The Secret War is a six-part television series that was produced by the BBC in conjunction with the Imperial War Museum (IWM) that documented secret technical developments during the Second World War. It first aired during 1977 and was presented by William Woollard, drawing on the first-hand recollections of participants from both sides. The principal interviewee was R. V. Jones, whose autobiography informed much of the research before its publication.

== Episodes ==
=== Episode 1: "The Battle of the Beams" (5 January 1977) ===
This episode documented how British intelligence became aware of Luftwaffe navigation beams, such as Knickebein, X Gerät and Y Gerät and the countermeasures developed to combat them in what became known as the Battle of the Beams. It is largely based on the book Most Secret War, which was written by Jones, who appears in the series. The episode contains rare footage of The Blitz including the Coventry Blitz. Interviewees include Albert Speer, Sir Robert Cockburn and Air vice-marshal Edward Addison.

=== Episode 2: "To See for a Hundred Miles" (12 January 1977) ===
This episode covers the development of radar from its first discovery to the creation of the Chain Home system in time for the Battle of Britain and the development of the cavity magnetron. The episode explains how British intelligence learnt of German radar developments, including the Freya and Würzburg radar systems. Operation Biting (the Bruneval Raid) to capture a Würzburg system is described. It also contains details of the RAF Bomber offensive electronic warfare with the Luftwaffe that used devices such as Window, Gee, Oboe, H2S and airborne interception (AI) radar. It features interviews and demonstrations with Jones, Arnold Wilkins, John Randall and Harry Boot, Bernard Lovell, Donald Bennett, Richard Philipp and others. Speer also appears and talks about the Bombing of Hamburg.

=== Episode 3: "Terror Weapons" (19 January 1977) ===
This episode uncovers the development of Adolf Hitler's vengeance weapons, how British authorities became aware of the menace and what actions were taken to prevent or to delay their use. It features rare footage of the V-1 flying bomb, the V-2 missile and Operation Hydra, the bombing of Peenemünde and details of Operation Most III, along with interviews featuring Jones, Duncan Sandys, Albert Speer, Constance Babington Smith, Roland Beamont, Janusz Groszkowski and Raymond Baxter.

=== Episode 4: "The Deadly Waves" (26 January 1977) ===
This episode examines the magnetic mine and the countermeasures developed to overcome it, including degaussing and features an interview with Lieutenant Commander John Ouvry from HMS Vernon, who defuzed the first intact German magnetic mine recovered by the Allies, on the sands at Shoeburyness in Essex. The mine that he recovered was featured in a re-enactment for the episode. It also contains interviews with Commander John Ouvry, Captain Roger Lewis, Sir Charles Goodeve, Sir Edward Bullard and Donald Henley.

=== Episode 5: "If" (2 February 1977) ===
This episode shows certain inventions that never became operational or whose deployment was significantly delayed, leaving one to imagine what could have happened "if" certain developments had achieved widespread use. The programme features many inventions such as the Messerschmitt Me 321 and Messerschmitt Me 323; various contraptions intended to help the Invasion of Normandy, including the Panjandrum and Operation Pluto; the Bachstelze autogyro; early helicopters, British and German bouncing bomb developments; the Henschel Hs 293, the Messerschmitt Me 163 and jet aircraft developments such as the Gloster E.28/39, Messerschmitt Me 262 and Gloster Meteor. Interviewees include Hanna Reitsch, Adolf Galland, Frank Whittle, Stanley Hooker, Constance Babington Smith and Albert Speer.

=== Episode 6: "Still Secret" (9 February 1977) ===
This episode covers the story of the Enigma machine and the Lorenz cipher and how, after valuable initial work by the Polish intelligence service Biuro Szyfrów (BS4) and the French, the codes were broken at Bletchley Park, including some information on the Colossus computer that was still secret when the programme was made. It explains how the codes were broken and how the information was used. It features interviews with Gordon Welchman, Harry Golombek, Peter Calvocoressi, F. W. Winterbotham, Max Newman, Jack Good and Tommy Flowers.

== "The Battle of the Atlantic" (related documentary - 24 January 1978) ==
This documentary is a detailed look into the Battle of the Atlantic, the technical developments and tactics used by both sides during the long and difficult campaign. It features such innovations as Asdic, Type 271 radar, Rudeltaktik (wolf pack tactics), catapult fighters, the Hedgehog, huff-duff, US blimps, ASV radar, the Leigh light, Metox, naval H2S radar, submarine snorkels and escort carriers. Contributions are from Donald Macintyre, Patrick Beesly, Carl Emmermann, Humphrey de Verd Leigh and Bernard Lovell. Although included with some video versions of The Secret War as a purported seventh episode, this programme was not made as part of the series; it was aired as a standalone documentary a year after The Secret War, and preceded a repeat run of the earlier series.

== Production ==
The programme credited contributions from

- Admiralty Degaussing Establishment
- A&AEE Boscombe Down
- Bibliothek für Zeitgeschichte, Stuttgart
- B.I.C.C. Ltd
- British Petroleum
- Ministry of Defence
- Defence Explosive Ordnance Disposal School, Rochester
- Department of the Environment
- Film Polski
- GEC-Henley Ltd
- HMS Belfast
- HMS Collingwood, Portsmouth
- HMS Dolphin, Portsmouth
- HMS Heron, Yeovilton
- HMS Vernon
- National Archive, Washington
- National Film Board of Canada
- National Physical Laboratory
- RAF Museum Hendon
- RAF Farnborough
- RAF Medmenham
- RAF St Athan
- RAF Uxbridge
- The Post Office
- Portsmouth Corporation
- Proof & Experimental Establishment, Shoeburyness
- Rolls-Royce
- Royal Radar Establishment
- Science Research Council
- Admiralty Surface Weapons Establishment, Portsmouth
- Air Commodore Henry Iliffe Cozens provided footage from his 1943 colour film, shot at RAF Hemswell, later released as Night Bombers
- United States Air Force
- US Navy

The historical adviser for the series was Alfred Price.

== Media ==
Episodes 1 to 6 were distributed on a double DVD by Simply Media, licensed from BBC, titled The Secret War: The Complete Original 1977 Series.

Episodes 1 to 6 were distributed on a 3 VHS set(c) BBC Enterprises Ltd 1994, titled The Secret War: BBCV 5339-5341
