= Frank Blackmore =

British traffic engineer (1916–2008)

Frank Blackmore OBE DFC (16 February 1916 – 5 June 2008) was a British airman and traffic engineer. He led the development of modern roundabouts, using deflection to slow approaching vehicles. This overcame capacity and safety issues, greatly increasing their usefulness and popularity around the world. He subsequently invented the mini roundabout.

Blackmore was born in 1916 at Fort National, Algeria, where his father worked as a missionary. Along with his sisters Lorna and Violette and brother William, he later moved to Lausanne, Switzerland, the birth country of his mother. He studied civil engineering until moving to Britain in 1936. He started to work for Colchester borough council until the outbreak of World War II when he joined the Royal Air Force. He was awarded the Air Force Cross for his actions when he made an emergency landing on the beach at Ardnamurchan Point. He rose to the rank of Wing Commander and remained with the RAF until 1959.

In 1960 he joined the Transport Research Laboratory (TRL). During his time with the TRL he came up with several ideas to improve the flow of traffic at junctions, in particular: the use of deflection to slow traffic approaching roundabouts; and the mini-roundabout, which was officially adopted in 1975.

Blackmore was honoured with an OBE in 1976. He left the TRL in 1980. After he retired he continued to work as an overseas consultant in Bangkok, Baghdad, and California.

Blackmore died on 5 June 2008. He is survived by two daughters and a son. His first wife, Ginon Dufour, died of tuberculosis in 1942. His second marriage to Eva Johnson was dissolved in 1969.
