= Picratol =

Shock-insensitive high-explosive mixture

Picratol is a high explosive mixture, comprising 52% 'Explosive D' and 48% TNT. It has a detonation velocity of approximately 6,972 metres per second. Picratol has no civilian applications. It was exclusively intended for military use and was in use in the US during the Second World War.

Two basic advantages of Picratol is its insensitivity to shock and ability to be loaded into ammunition by pouring a melted sludge. As a result, it proved useful as the main explosive filling in armour-piercing aerial bombs. The main application was the American 2000-lb semi-AP bomb M103.

Picratol is an obsolete explosive and is therefore unlikely to be encountered, except in the form of legacy munitions and unexploded ordnance.
