= Shellite (explosive) =

Chemicals used in WWI and WWII munitions

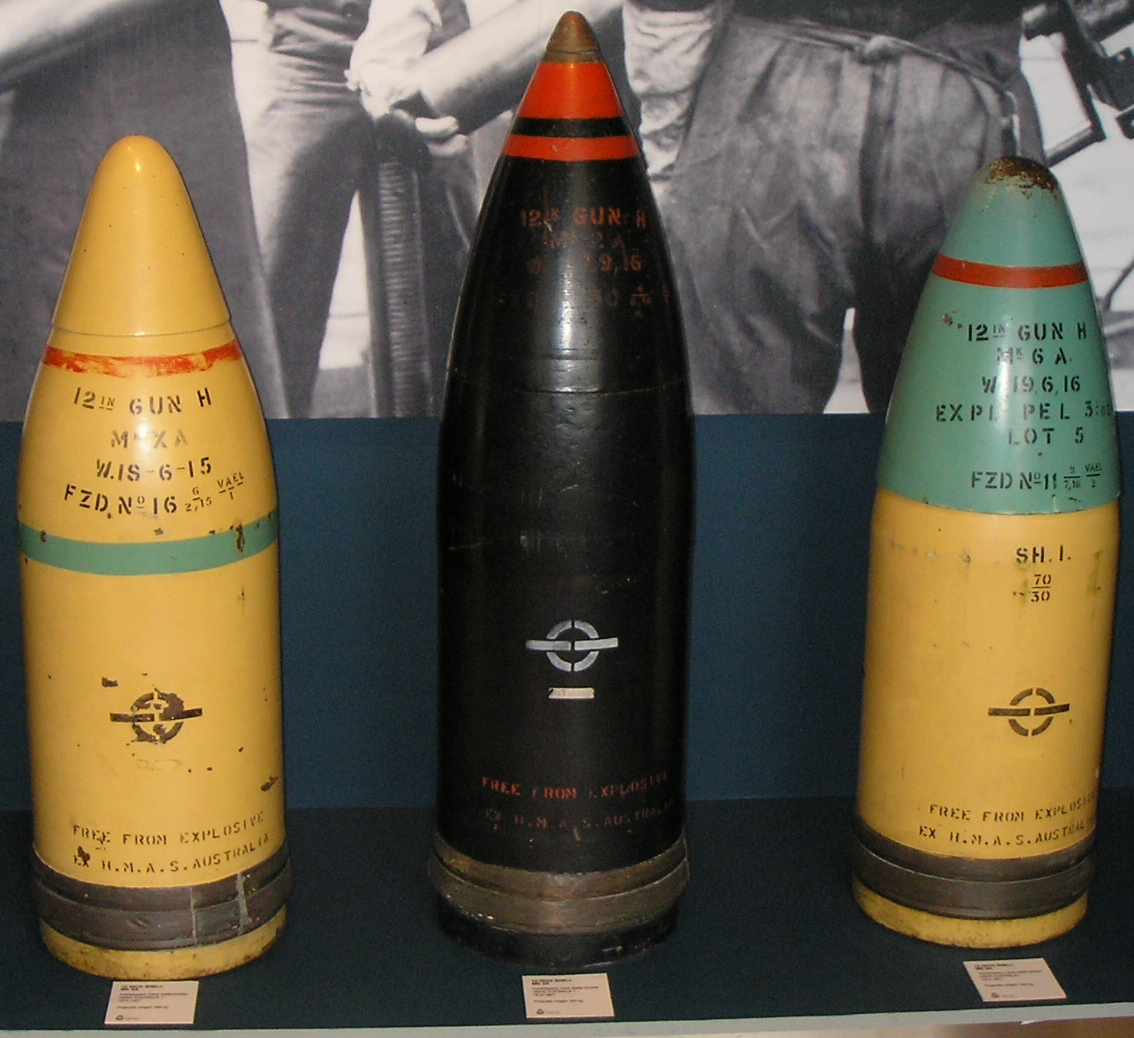
British, 12 inch shells displayed at the Royal Australian Navy Heritage Centre (2008). On the right is a Mk 6A Capped Common pointed shell, (formerly) filled with Shellite 70/30

Shellite (known as Tridite in US service) is an explosive mixture of picric acid and dinitrophenol or picric acid and hexanitrodiphenylamine in a ratio of 70/30. It was typically used as a filling in Royal Navy armour-piercing shells during the early part of the 20th century.

== History ==
Shellite originated after World War I as a development of lyddite (picric acid). During the war, lyddite-filled, armour-piercing shells had been found to be shock-sensitive, with a tendency to prematurely detonate upon impact rather than after penetrating the target's armour plate. Shellite was less sensitive, and also had the advantage of a low melting point, that allowed it to be easily melted and poured into shell casings during manufacture. The first trials of shellite took place in 1921, when the British monitor HMS Terror experimentally fired different types of 15 inch (381 mm) shell at 500-yard (460 m), point-blank range against the surrendered German battleship SMS Baden.

During World War II, Shellite continued to be used in naval shells. It was used in the British Disney bomb, a type of concrete-piercing bomb.

== Legacy ==
Shellite-filled munitions may still be encountered in the wrecks of sunken warships. They are considered hazardous as, over time, picric acid will react to form crystals of metal picrates, such as iron picrate. These crystals are extremely shock sensitive and it is recommended that wrecks that contain shellite munitions not be disturbed in any way. The hazard may reduce when the shells become corroded enough to admit seawater as these materials are water-soluble.
