= Charles F. Goodeve =

Canadian chemist and pioneer in operations research

Sir Charles Frederick Goodeve OBE FRS (21 February 1904 – 7 April 1980) was a Canadian chemist and pioneer in operations research. During World War II, he was instrumental in developing the "hedgehog" antisubmarine warfare weapon and the degaussing method for protecting ships from naval mines.

== Biography ==
Goodeve was born in Neepawa, Manitoba, the son of Frederick W. Goodeve, an Anglican clergyman. His early childhood was in Stonewall, Manitoba, but when he was around 10 years old the family moved to Winnipeg, where he grew up. He attended Kelvin High School and the University of Manitoba, passing his BSc exams in 1925 in chemistry and physics, and receiving an MSc in electrochemistry in 1927. In that year he was awarded an 1851 Research Fellowship from the Royal Commission for the Exhibition of 1851, to study at University College London, where he studied under Fred Donnan.

Goodeve was appointed a lecturer in Physical Chemistry in 1930 and Reader in 1937. He was awarded the D.Sc. from the University of London in 1936 for his work with Donnan, and was elected a Fellow of the Royal Society in 1940.

After the war, Goodeve became the Director of the British Iron and Steel Research Association (B.I.S.R.A.). He was awarded the Bessemer Gold Medal of the Iron and Steel Institute in 1962. After retiring in 1969, Goodeve pursued his interest in operational research.

In 1977, he appeared in the BBC Television series The Secret War (episode: "The Deadly Waves" where he recounted his work on the 'Double L Sweep').

== Death ==
Goodeve developed Parkinson's disease, which contributed to his death in 1980.

== Work ==
=== Naval service ===
While in Winnipeg, Goodeve had served in the Royal Canadian Naval Volunteer Reserve – HMCS Chippawa. In England, he joined the Royal Naval Volunteer Reserve.

In 1936, he was promoted to the rank of Lieutenant Commander. In 1939, he began work at HMS Vernon, specializing in ways to counter the threat of mines. He developed the "Double L" technique for minesweeping magnetic mines. Later he developed the degaussing method for reducing the magnetic field around ships which triggered mines; Goodeve coined the term after the gauss unit, used by the Germans during the war to measure magnetic fields which they named after German scientist Carl Friedrich Gauss (1777–1855). He also developed the related technique of "wiping". To aid the Dunkirk evacuation, the British "wiped" 400 ships in four days.

In 1940, Goodeve implemented the British production of the Swiss-designed Oerlikon 20 mm cannon, which was needed as anti-aircraft protection on naval and merchant ships. His group, renamed the Directorate of Miscellaneous Weapons Development (D.M.W.D.), then worked on antisubmarine warfare developing the hedgehog, an array of spigot mortars which threw small, contact-fused bombs ahead of a ship. At one point, to protect the project from internecine warfare inside the Royal Navy, Goodeve finagled a demonstration of a prototype for Prime Minister Winston Churchill. By the end of the war the weapon had accounted for some fifty U-boats. For his work in weapon development, Goodeve was awarded an O.B.E.

In 1942, the Third Sea Lord, Vice Admiral Sir William Wake-Walker, appointed Goodeve Assistant Controller Research and Development, with broad oversight of the Navy's research and development efforts.

At the end of the war, Goodeve was knighted, and awarded the U.S. Medal of Freedom.
