= Department of Miscellaneous Weapons Development =

1941–1945 British Admiralty department

Department overview
- Formed: 1941
- Dissolved: 1945
- Jurisdiction: Government of the United Kingdom
- Headquarters: Admiralty Building Whitehall London
- Parent Department: Admiralty

The Department of Miscellaneous Weapons Development (DMWD), also known as the Directorate of Miscellaneous Weapon Development and colloquially known as the Wheezers and Dodgers, was a department of the British Admiralty responsible for the development of various unconventional weapons during World War II.

== History ==
The Directorate of Miscellaneous Weapon Development was a temporary wartime body which developed in 1941 from the Inspectorate of Anti-Aircraft Weapons and Devices, set up in 1940 (an office of Admiral James Somerville) which was corrupted to "Instigator of Anti-Aircraft Wheezes and Dodges" to advance radar and other devices for anti-aircraft and other purposes. Charles Goodeve was responsible for its expansion from an Inspectorate and widening of its role.

"Its research and experiments were carried out by officers based in universities, in research establishments, and in the directorate's own experimental establishment, HMS Birnbeck at Weston-super-Mare, and The Frythe at Welwyn, which it took over from the Inter-Service Research Bureau in 1945. It undertook anti-aircraft research, providing devices such as vertical rocket mountings; anti-submarine research, producing radar deflectors and decoys among other things; and amphibious assaults research, producing nets for landing craft etc. It also investigated camouflage for vessels."

"In 1944 some of its staff were detached to set up a Directorate of Admiralty Research and Development in India, which undertook liaison between the East Indies Fleet and technical Admiralty departments, and provided some scientific and technical advice. After the war the directorate amalgamated with Coastal Forces Material and Combined Operations Material Departments to form the Craft and Amphibious Material Directorate. Responsibility for the Admiralty Experimental Station, Welwyn, was transferred to the Director of Aeronautical and Engineering Research in 1946."

Among the staff were Lieutenant-Commander N. S. Norway, RNVR (better known by his pen name, Nevil Shute); Lt-Cdr Edward Terrell RNVR, who developed plastic armour for ships and tanks and who left in late 1941 to join the First Sea Lord's staff; renowned motor racing photographer Louis Klemantaski; and Barnes Wallis, inventor of the Upkeep dam-busting bomb.

== Directors of Miscellaneous Weapons Development ==
Included:

- Captain G.O.C. Davies (known as Jock Davies), 1941-1943 who came from the Ministry of Supply.
- Captain F.W.H. Jeans, CVO, ADC, 1943-1945 who came from the Admiralty in Washington. (1)(5).

== Projects ==
DMWD was responsible for a number of devices of varying practicality and success, many of which were based on solid-fuel rocket propulsion. As might be expected of a small, dynamic and highly experimental group, their efforts had mixed results, notable among which were the Panjandrum rocket-propelled beach defence demolition weapon and Hajile, a rocket-powered alternative to parachutes for dropping materiel.

A scheme to camouflage bodies of water, used as navigation markers by bombers, was undertaken by a group named the "Kentucky Minstrels". It involved spreading coal dust from a ship, ironically named HMS Persil. The scheme failed due to the actions of the wind and tides, but did produce some confusion when the coal-covered waters were mistaken for tarmac in the blackout.

The most successful and significant developments of the department included the Hedgehog anti-submarine weapon and Squid anti-submarine mortar, as well as the Holman Projector, the development of an Army anti-aircraft rocket battery designed to be mountable on naval vessels, and the system of degaussing used to protect ships against magnetic mines. Above all, it played an important role in developing parts of the Mulberry harbour used in the D-Day landings.

Hedgehog was developed after the 29mm spigot mortar anti-tank weapon designed by Lt-Col Stewart Blacker were shown to the DMWD by MD1 ("Churchill's Toyshop").

Several experimental weapons were trialled at Brean Down Fort, a satellite unit of HMS Birnbeck (Birnbeck pier taken over as a base for DMWD) in Weston-super-Mare, North Somerset. Some of the better-known weapons trialled were the seaborne bouncing bomb, designed specifically to bounce to a target such as across water to avoid torpedo nets, the anti-submarine missile AMUCK, and the expendable acoustic emitter designed to confuse noise-seeking torpedoes.
