= Bremen Exchange =

The Bremen Exchange (German: Bremer Börse) in Bremen was one of the eight German Regional stock exchanges until 2007. In 2000 it ceased to use the Open outcry method and in 2007 the last operative units were closed. The property of exchange's holding company went to the newly established Foundation of the Bremen Stock Exchange (Stiftung Bremer Wertpapierbörse), a non-profit organisation which is intended to benefit scholarship, research, and culture.

== Origins ==
In the late Middle Ages the Bremer Marktplatz and Liebfrauenkirchhof passage were the most important centres of trade and commerce in Bremen. Desire for an exchange arose at the beginning of the seventeenth century. Therefore, in 1613/14, 28 small houses at the south end of Liebfrauenkirchhof passage were torn down. Twenty-one stone vaults for wine storage were constructed over the next six years. The empty space in the vaults was made into an exchange and was soon playing host to most business activities.

== The Old Exchange ==
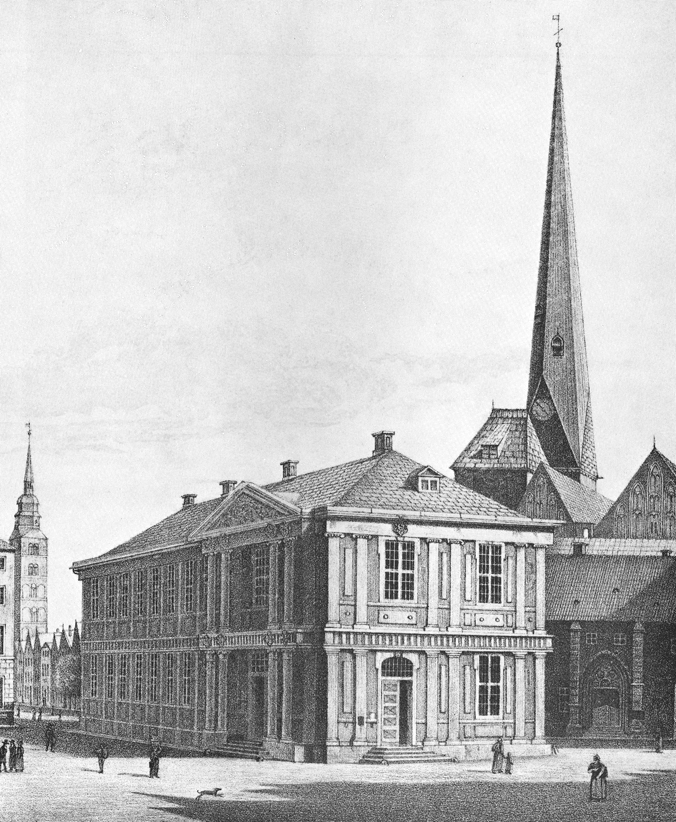
The Old Exchange (Alte Börse) with the Church of Our Lady (at right) and St. Ansgarii's (at left in the background) in 1822

On account of the dilapidation of the vaults and the ever-increasing volume of trade, the Senate of Bremen issued the First Exchange Ordinance on 14 March 1682, as a result of which the architect Jean Baptiste Broebes began construction of a single story building in the Baroque style above the cellar in 1687. A second story, designed by Giselher von Warneck was built between 1734 and 1736.

This baroque building is known as the Old Exchange (Alte Börse). On the ground floor there was the trading hall and the lottery office. The office was rebuilt towards the end of the eighteenth century as a book store. In the new second story there was a large banquet hall and two smaller halls for concerts, weddings, guest receptions and similar events. At the time the vaulted cellar was probably connected to the Bremen Ratskeller. Activity in the Old Exchange concentrated predominantly on real estate, merchandise, and banking transactions, but stocks were also traded.

After Napoleon Bonaparte and his troops occupied Bremen, the Exchange was temporarily closed by the French. This prompted a move to Kramerhaus and the Town Hall, where commerce was able to continue. In October 1813, after the defeat of the French, the Exchange was able to resume its activities in the building on Liebfrauenkirchhof.

In 1816 the Merchants' Guild issued the Second Exchange Ordinance with the support of the Senate. The commercial situation of the merchants was not very promising at the time, but it improved in the 1820s and very soon the Old Exchange was found to be inadequate. The Third Exchange Ordinance was published in 1849, which vested oversight of commerce with a Chamber of Commerce. From 1853, this Chamber received support from the newly founded Bremen Exchange Association (Bremer Börsenverein). Additionally, the building became home to the Upper Court, Lower Court, Commercial Court and Civil Chamber of the Bremen District Court.

In 1864, trade was shifter to the New Exchange (Neue Börse) in the Marktplatz. The Old Exchange, no longer in use, burnt down in 1888. After the demolition of the ruins, the vaulted cellar was lowered and made part of the modern Bachuskeller in the Bremer Ratskeller.

== The New Exchange ==
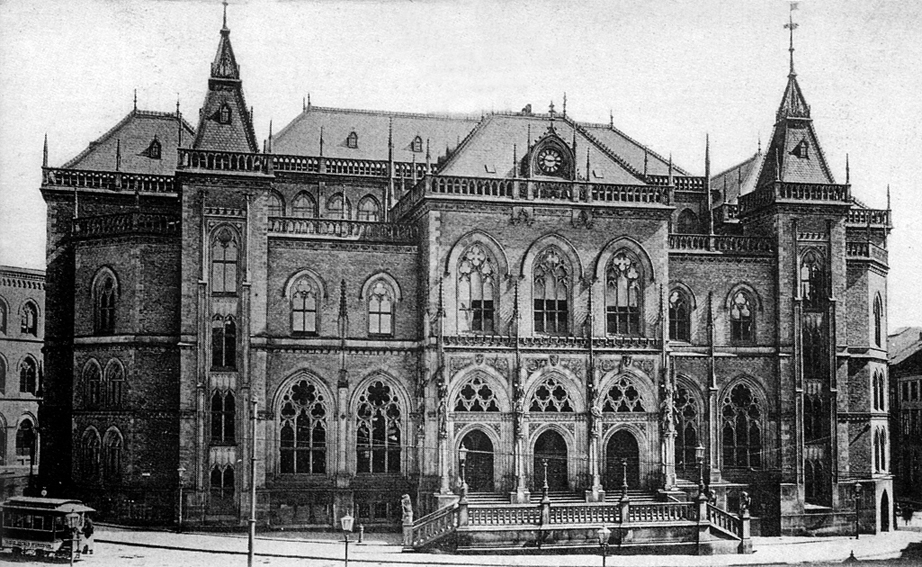
The New Exchange (Neue Börse) in the Marktplatz at the end of the 19th century

In 1855 the Bremen Chamber of Commerce and the Exchange Organisation agreed on the construction of a new building. For this purpose they had an area on the east side of the Marktplatz cleared between 1860 and 1863, demolishing seventeen old gabled houses and Wilhadi Chapel. A new commercial hub was erected between 1861 and 1864 under the direction of Heinrich Müller and inaugurated on 5 November 1864.

The New Exchange (Neue Börse) on the Marktplatz was a large Neo-Gothic building with two towers and a passage to the Schütting (the offices of the Bremen Chamber of Commerce). The interior was decorated by many of the most well-known artists of the time, including the painters Arthur Fitger and P. Janssen and the sculptor Diedrich Samuel Kropp among others. The building included a great hall, several counting rooms, a meeting room, and offices which were also used by the Bürgerschaft of Bremen. In addition there was a restaurant in the basement, which is still in operation.

When the New Exchange opened, the trade in securities was still a minor part of its business. It was mainly concerned with the exchange of promissory notes and actual goods. This changed in the 1890s. On 1 January 1890 a stock exchange was set up which would trade in shares and other securities, according to new guidelines. Thereafter the Bremen Stock Exchange grew ever more important and soon made connections with other European institutes. With the entry into force of the Imperial Stock Exchange Act on 23 June 1896 it became a publicly funded organisation. With the establishment of the independent Bremen Cotton Exchange (Bremer Baumwollbörse) trade in goods at the New Exchange significantly decreased.

In the course of the November Revolution of 1918, the New Exchange was briefly in the political spotlight when the politician Alfred Henke announced the seizure of power by a Worker's council and the dissolution of the Bremen Senate and Bürgerschaft in a hall of the building, marking the beginning of the short-lived Bremen Civic Republic. In 1934 the New Exchange was closed and the civic trade in securities was transferred to the Hanseatic Exchange in Hamburg.

=== New Exchange annex ===
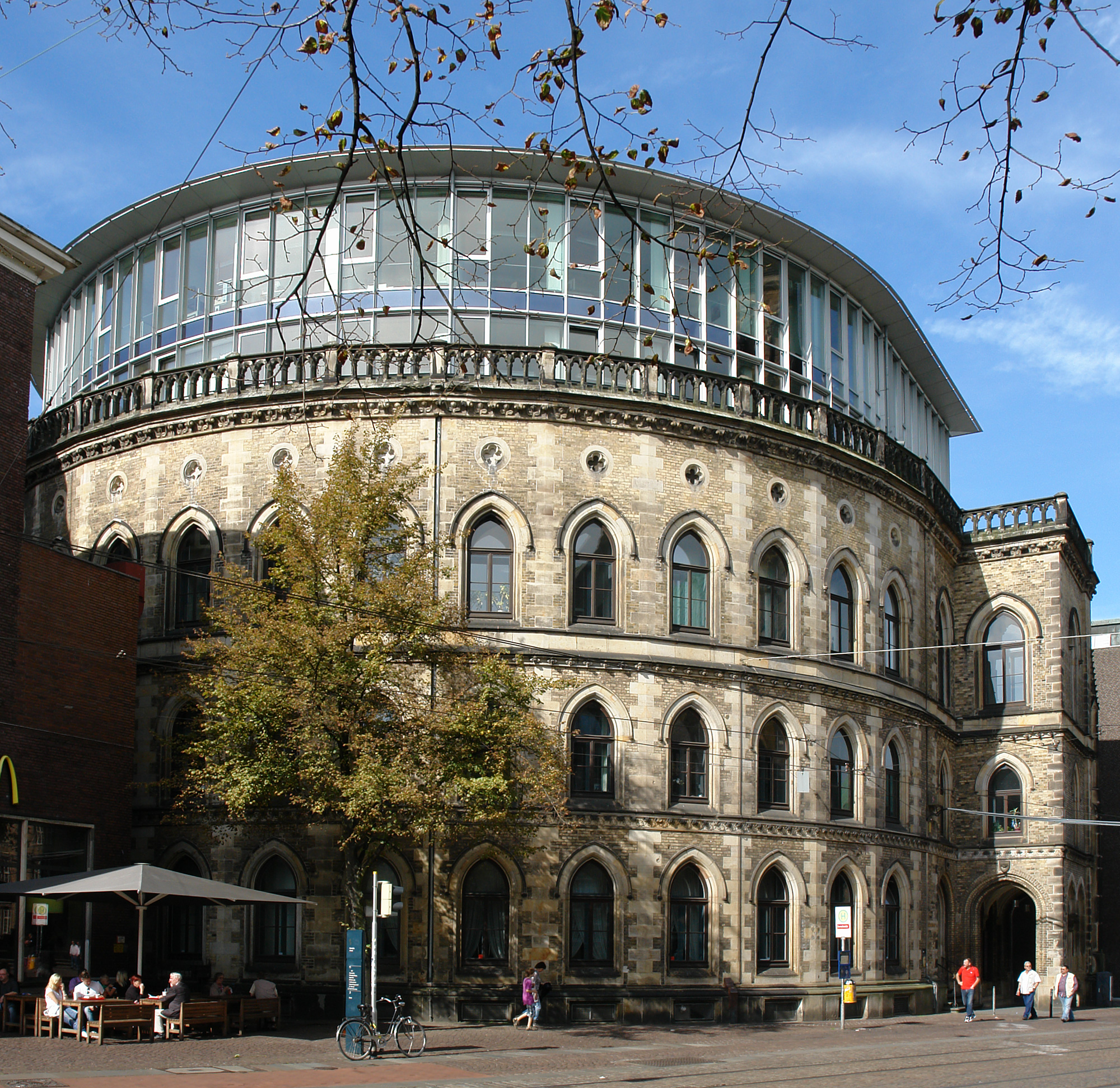
Exchange Court A (Börsenhof A)

Exchange Court A (Börsenhof A), Am Dom No. 5 A, was an annex of the New Exchange. While the main building built by Heinrich Müller between 1861 and 1864 had to be demolished by the Bürgerschaft after heavy bombing in 1943, the counting house still survives. This is Exchange Court A, which was placed under protection as a cultural monument of Bremen in 1992. Between 2000 and 2001, this semicircular building was restored and expanded by the Bremen architects Schomers and Schürmann.

== World War II to present ==
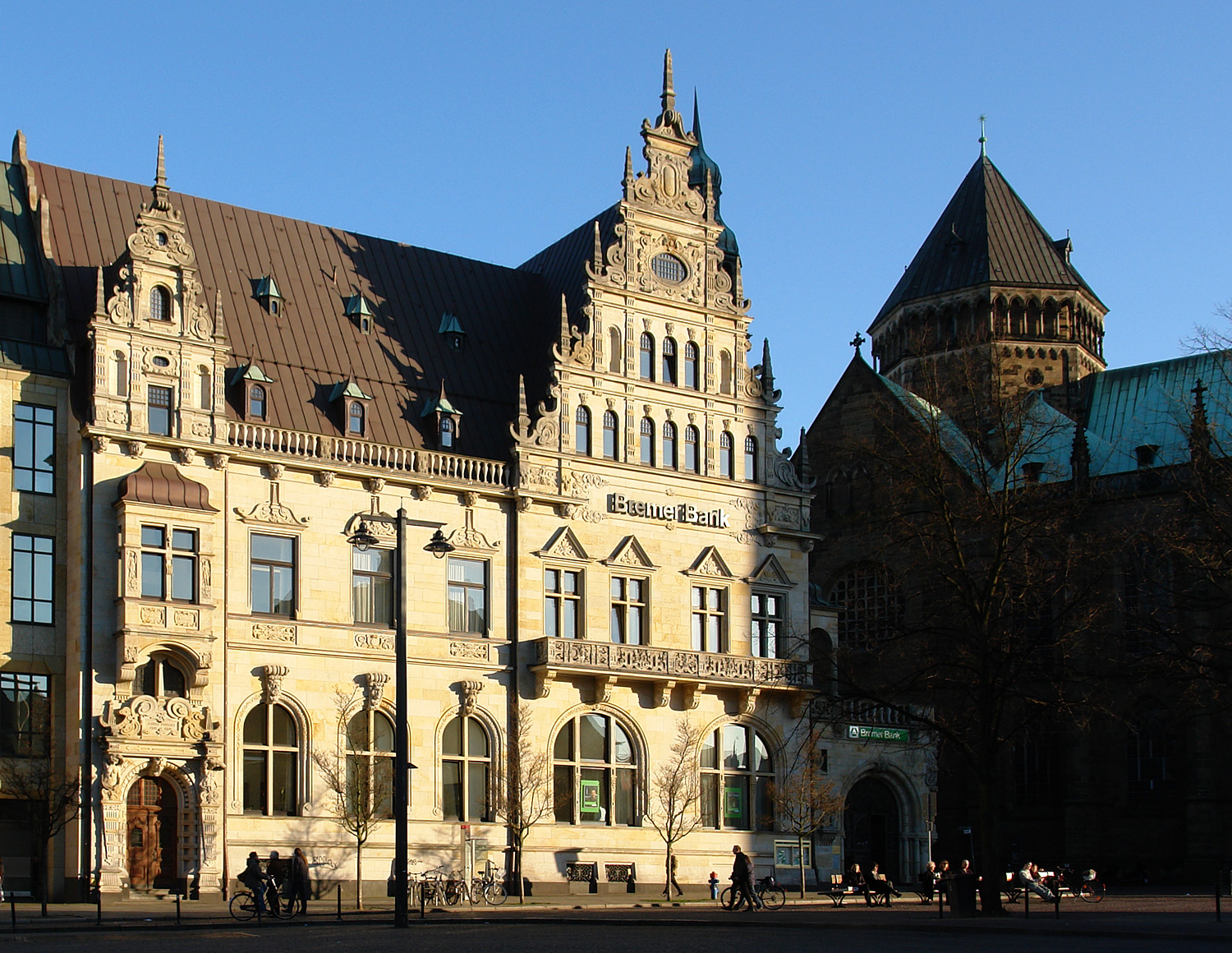
The Bremer Bank building was the home of the Exchange between 1980 and 1990.

On 20 December 1943, the main building of the New Exchange was burnt down in an air raid. Only the associated buildings to the east survived. The Bremen Stock Exchange was reopened on 16 February 1949, with the consent of the American occupying power. Business was at first conducted in the Savings Bank and then in a room in the Schütting.

The surviving portion of the Old Exchange was restored and expanded. The ruins of the main building of the New Exchange remained in place for twelve years, until their demolition in 1955. Early in 1957 the Chamber of Commerce sold the lot to the city. The house of the Bürgerschaft of Bremen, designed by Wassili Luckhardt, was built there in 1965/6.

In 1980 the Exchange moved into the Bremer Bank building on the Domshof. Ten years later it moved into the building at 2-12 on Obernstraße near the Marktplatz, which had formerly been occupied by Schröder-Bank.

The Bremen Exchange early adopted the use of computers in security trading. From 1990 trades were extensively supported by the program BIFOS. In the following years, further programmes were adopted, including BOSS-CUBE, BÖGA (now XONTRO) and IBIS (succeeded by Xetra). Further measures were taken, especially to make trading attractive to private lenders, such as the reduction of the lower limit on continuous trading and the significant expansion of trading hours. In addition, the Bremer Exchange was active through subsidiaries in emissions trading, securities trading and settlement for third parties, especially small credit institutes and brokerage firms. This collection of measures led to a significant revival of trading activity from 1990.

Beginning in 2000, open outcry was conclusively replaced by computer trading, whereupon the institute moved once more on the basis of changed space requirements and settled about thirty securities dealers and brokers in the Beutsche Bundesbank building on Kohlhöker street. In 2002 it acquired a ten percent share in NASDAQ Deutschland AG, together with NASDAQ Europe AG (50%), the Berlin Exchange (10%), comdirect (7.5%), Commerzbank (7.5%) and Dresdner Bank (15%). The goal was the establishment of a new German stock exchange on the model of NASDAQ in the USA. However, expectations were not met.

In March 2003 the Bremen Exchange merged with the Berlin Exchange as the Exchange Bremen-Berlin (Börse Berlin-Bremen). In 2005 the operating company of the Bremen Exchange was sold to the Swiss Exchange after the failure of the joint venture with NASDAQ. In 2007, the agreement with the Berlin Exchange was dissolved. Foundation of the Bremen Stock Exchange (Stiftung Bremer Wertpapierbörse) was created from the company's holdings in Bremer Wertpapierbörse Holding (merged with BWB Wertpapierbank) and BWB Wertpapier-Emissionsberatung. The Foundation has operated since September 2007 as a non-profit organisation supporting scholarship, research and culture.

== Bibliography ==
- Herbert Schwarzwälder, Bremen im Wandel der Zeiten. Carl Schünemann Verlag, Bremen 1970.
- Herbert Schwarzwälder, Das Große Bremen-Lexikon. Edition Temmen, 2003, ISBN 3-86108-693-X.
