= Bremer Bank =

Bremer Bank may refer to:

- the Bank of Bremen, a former German bank
- banks owned by the Otto Bremer Trust in Minnesota
