= Bank of Prussia =

Former central bank

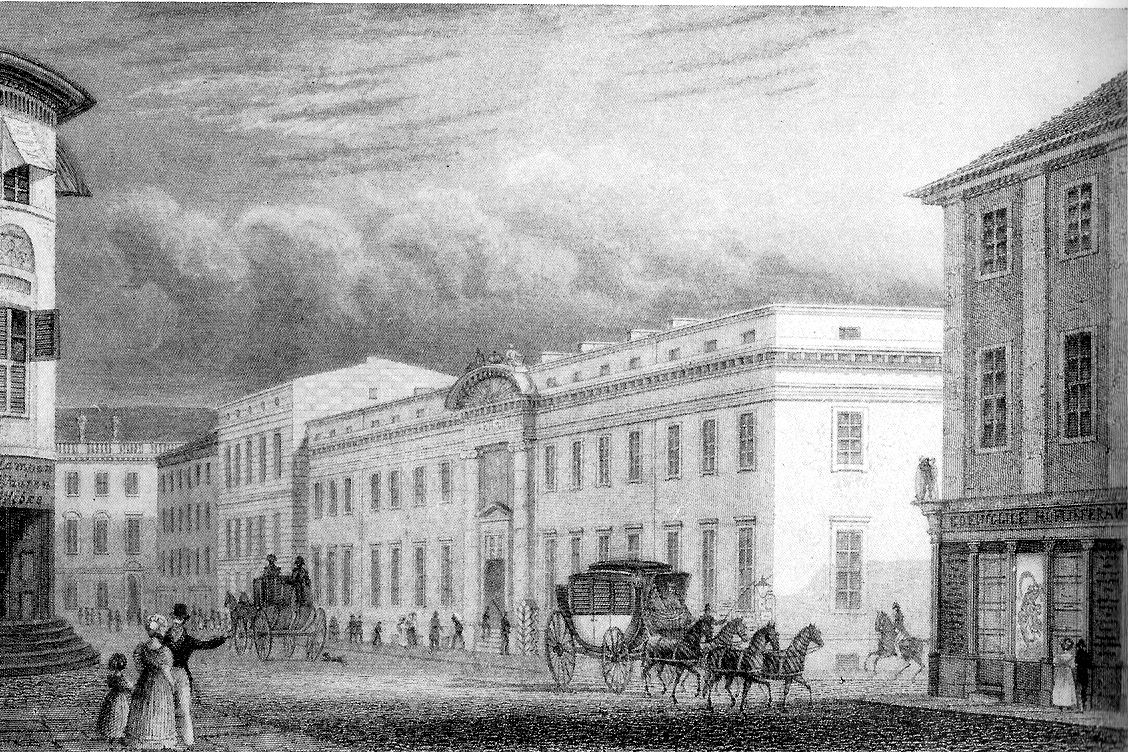
The Bank of Prussia on Jägerstrasse 34-35 in Berlin, around 1850

The Bank of Prussia (German: Preußische Bank) was the central bank of the Kingdom of Prussia. It was originally founded by Frederick the Great in 1765-1766 as the state-owned Prussian Royal Bank (German: Königliche Giro- und Lehnbank or Königliche Hauptbank). In 1847, it was reorganized as a formally private-sector entity and renamed the Bank of Prussia. It operated until 1 January 1876, when it was succeeded by the newly created Reichsbank.

== Prussian Royal Bank ==
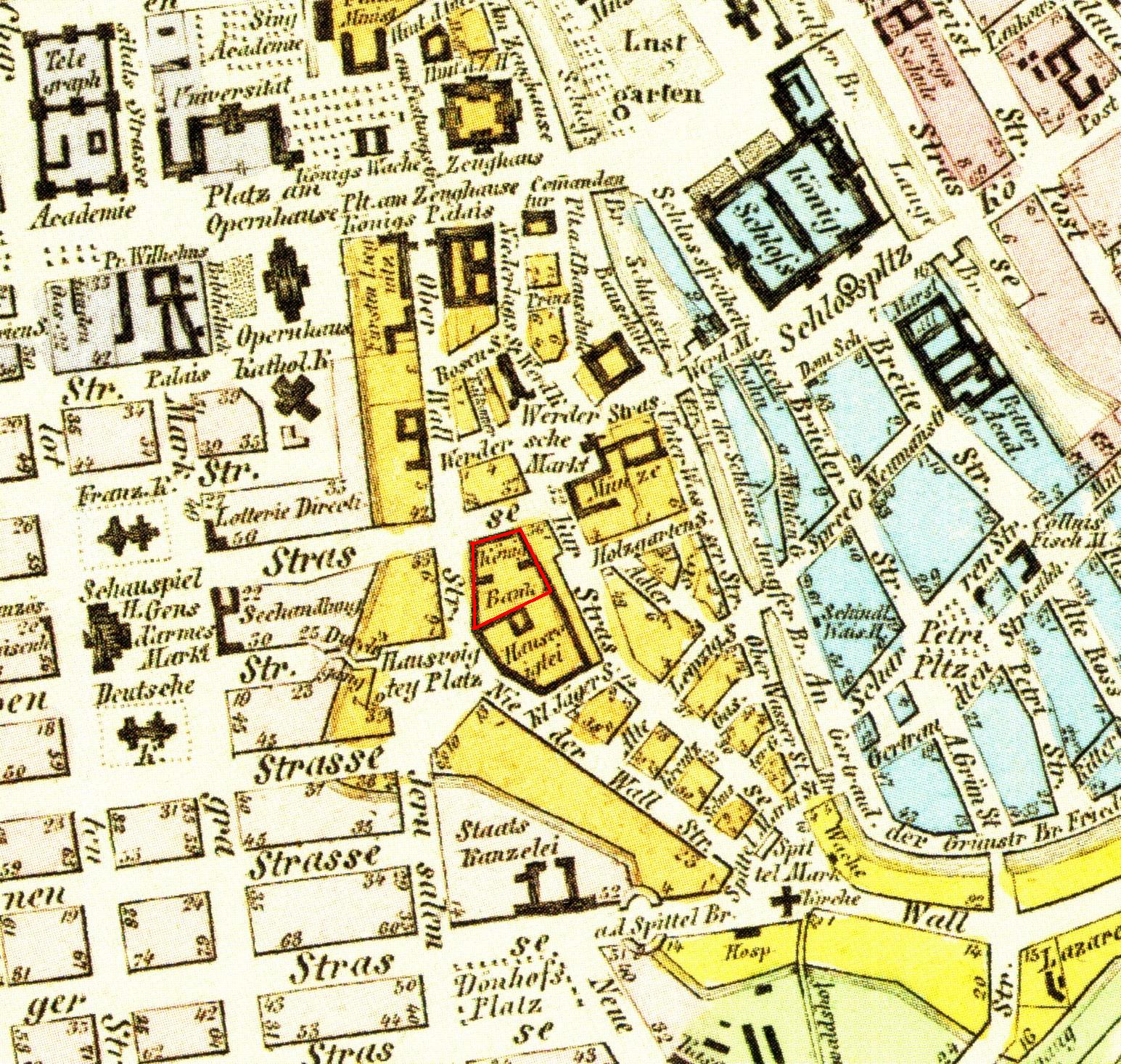
Map of central Berlin in 1847, with the Bank lined in red

Frederick II founded the Royal Bank on 17 June 1765, but it soon ran into financial trouble and had to be granted a revised charter to issue banknotes on 29 October 1766, which is why 1766 is often referred to as its founding date; it started operations under that new guise in 1767. The bank was located at Jägerstrasse 34-35 in Berlin's Friedrichswerder district, originally only on the ground floor of a building that had been erected by architect Johann Arnold Nering in 1690 as a home for the chief huntmaster of Brandenburg. Around 1786, the bank expanded into the whole building.

The Royal Bank's equity capital became negative in 1806 following the defeat of Prussia by Napoleon at Jena–Auerstedt, and subsequently remained so for an extended period of time, with convertibility gradually reinstated in the 1820s and fully achieved only in the 1830s. It developed more as a savings institution than as a central bank, and its note issuance remained comparatively limited.

== Bank of Prussia ==
The Bank of Prussia began operations on 1 January 1847, with individual private shareholders providing new equity capital while the Prussian state became a minority shareholder through its contribution of the old Royal Bank's business. Thus, the Prussian state contributed around 1.2 million Reichstaler, and private investors (not all Prussian) 10 million Reichstaler. Even though the individual shareholders were represented in an advisory board with a degree of influence, the management of the bank remained firmly under government control. The Bank's first President was the Prussian Minister of State Christian Rother, who had previously held the same position at the Royal Bank.

In 1848, David Hansemann became the bank's head, but his views on banking reform could not prevail under the conservative Prussian government of the time and he resigned in April 1851.

The bank's greatest challenge was to establish a monopoly on issuing money in order to assert itself against competing note-issuing banks. In 1856 the bank received an unrestricted but non-exclusive issuance privilege. That same year, in alliance with conservative Interior Minister Ferdinand von Westphalen, it successfully opposed the creation of joint-stock banks in Prussia, which had stopped at the single case of A. Schaaffhausen'scher Bankverein in 1848. The aftermath of the panic of 1857 cemented the Bank of Prussia's position as premier note-issuing bank in Germany.

The Bank of Prussia had 143 branches in 1867, growing to 167 in 1875. From 1869 to 1876, its head office was rebuilt on a design by architect Friedrich Hitzig; the completed structure was directly taken over by the Reichsbank, which had replaced the Bank of Prussia in the meantime.

== See also ==
- Bayerische Hypotheken- und Wechsel-Bank
- Frankfurter Bank
- Bank of Bremen
- List of banks in Germany
