= Unser Lieben Frauen Kirchhof =

Central square in Bremen, Germany

Coordinates: 53°4′36.70″N 8°48′26.88″E

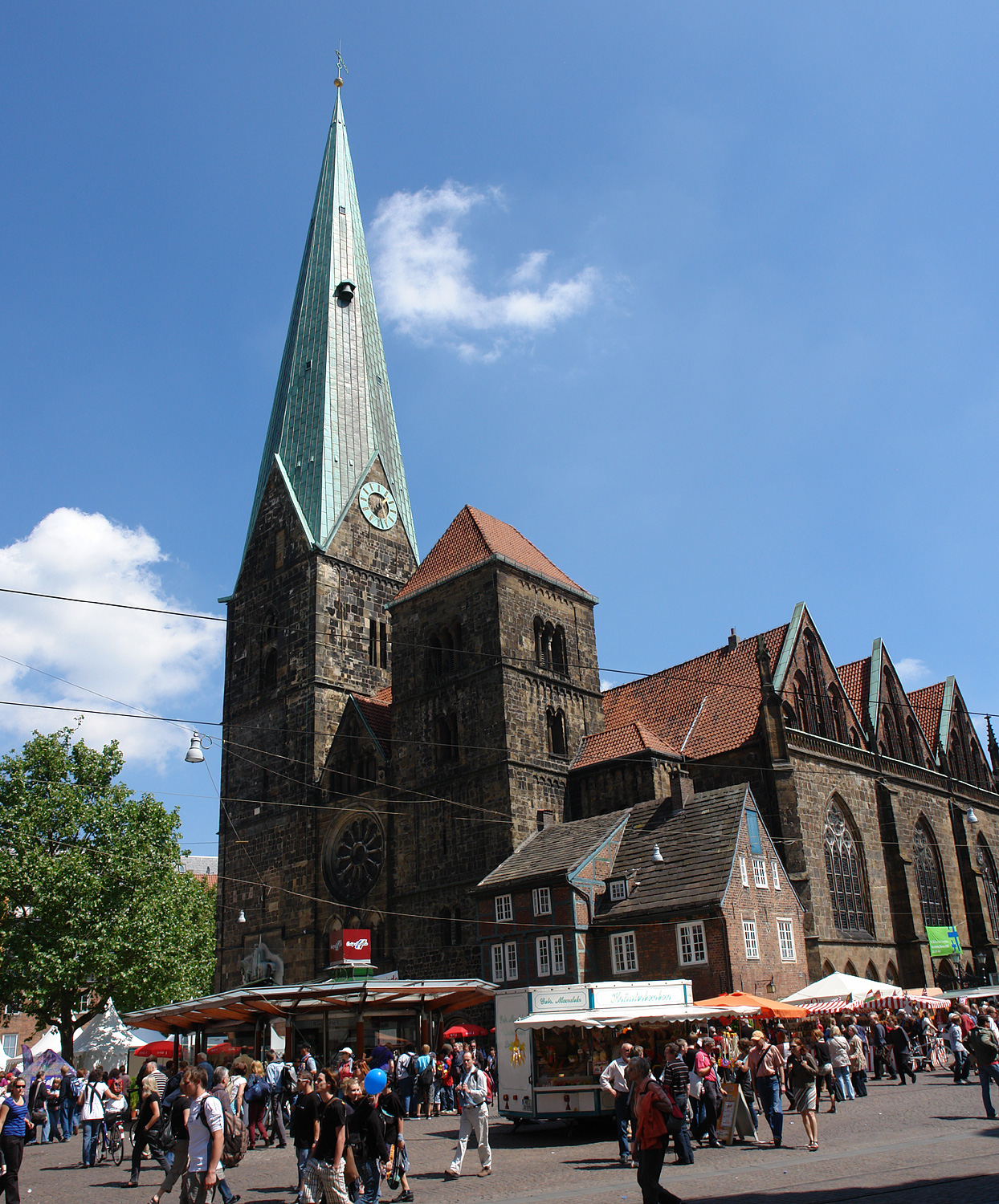
View of Liebfrauenkirche from west south west, from Obernstraße

Unser Lieben Frauen Kirchhof (German: Our Dear Lady's Churchyard) is a central square in Bremen between the Bremer Marktplatz, Obernstraße, Sögestraße and the Domshof. The square is used as a flower market. The appearance of the square is quite consistent: sandstone (as in the church), dark brick (as in the Rathaus) and clinker brick.

== History ==
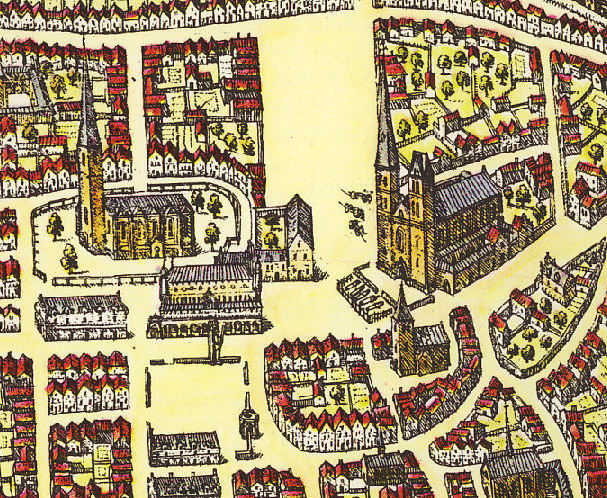
Frans Hogenberg 1589, a popular but very incorrect plan (detail): Left of the middle foreground, the Marktplatz, behind it the Bremen City Hall and to the left the (Old) Börse, behind both, the Unser Lieben Frauen Kirche with Kirchhof. Right of this, the Bishop's Palace projects into the (Main) Domshof. At the right corner of this the Dom and in front of its west facade is the fenced Little Domshof, in front of the now demolished Wilhadikapelle. In front of the Dom to the right is the Domsheide.

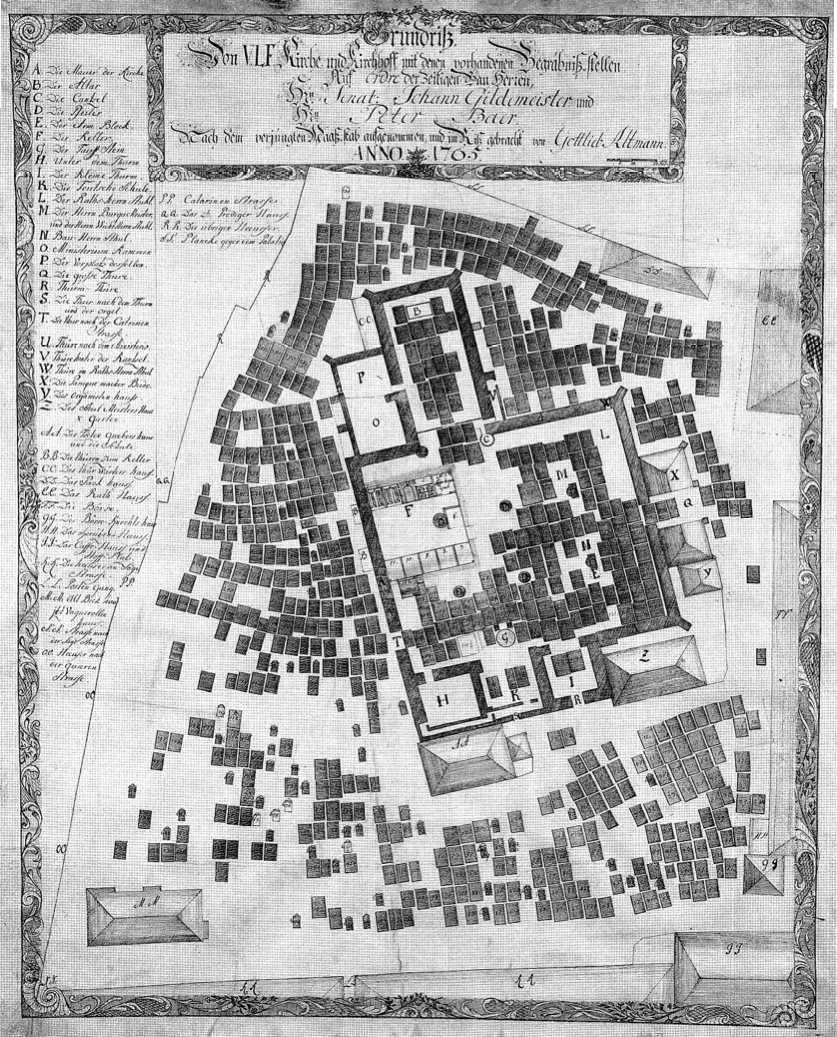
Graves in and around the Church of Our Dear Lady in 1765 (upside is south east)

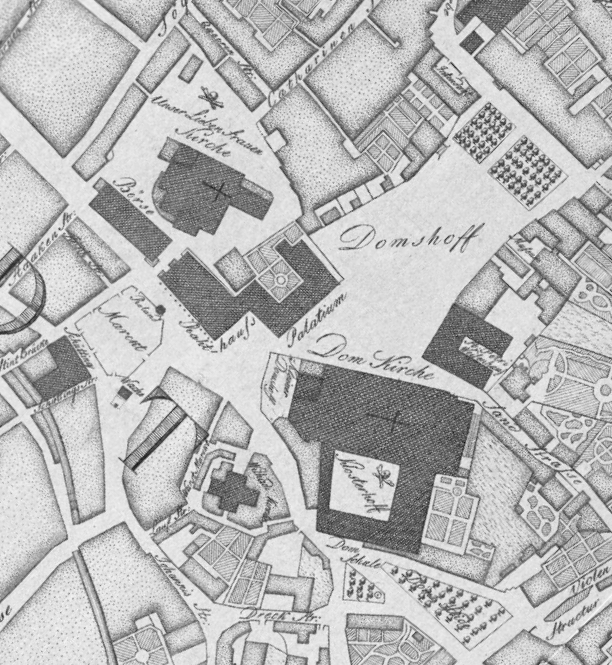
Central squares of Bremen, exact map of 1796. Area around "Unser Lieben Frauen Kirche" marked as a graveyard, but not fenced.

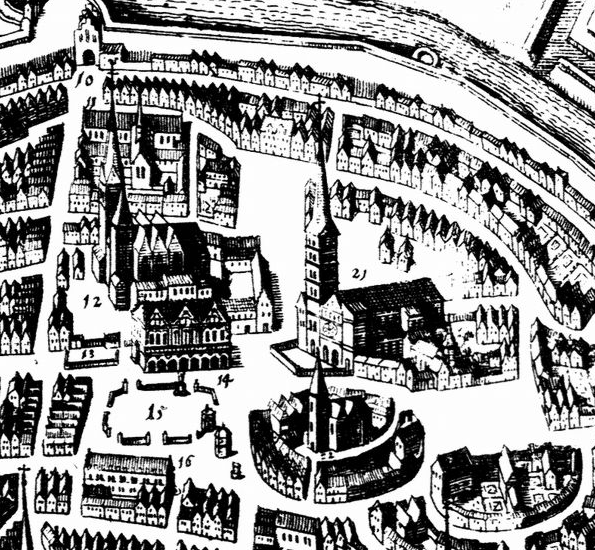
Matthäus Merian between 1638 and 1647: Rathaus after 1608-1612 renovations, south tower of the Dom collapsed in 1638. The construction of the Börse (stock exchange) had been stopped due to Thirty Years' War, the paved surface of its cellar was used for lazy walking.

The square surrounds the Unser Lieben Frauen Kirche (Church of our Lady) on three sides; the fabric of Medieval Gothic, it is the second oldest church in Bremen.

In the 16th century, there was still a fenced graveyard, but later on, almost the whole square was packed with graves. The churchyard and the flour of the church were the most important burial ground of Bremen. The first city hall of Bremen was situated at the south western edge of the Square, facing Obernstraße (High Street) to the south and Sögestraße (Pig Street) to the west. At this time the square also served as a marketplace, together with the Bremer Market, which was levelled and paved already in the thirteenth century. Liebfrauenkirche was specified as market church. In the seventeenth century the Old Börse stood on the north side of Obernstraße (which was mentioned already in the 13th century as Platea Superior ("Upper Paved Street"); the construction was interrupted in the Thirty Years' War, the basement could already be used as a wine cellar, the top side was provisionally paved with fine ashlar that had been bought for the building and was used as a ground for lazy walking ("spazierplatz"). In 1687, a one-story building was erected above the wine cellar in Baroque style, following plans of the Council's architect Jean Baptiste Broebes, who had fled from Paris. A second floor was added between 1734 and 1736 by the plans of Giselher von Warneck.

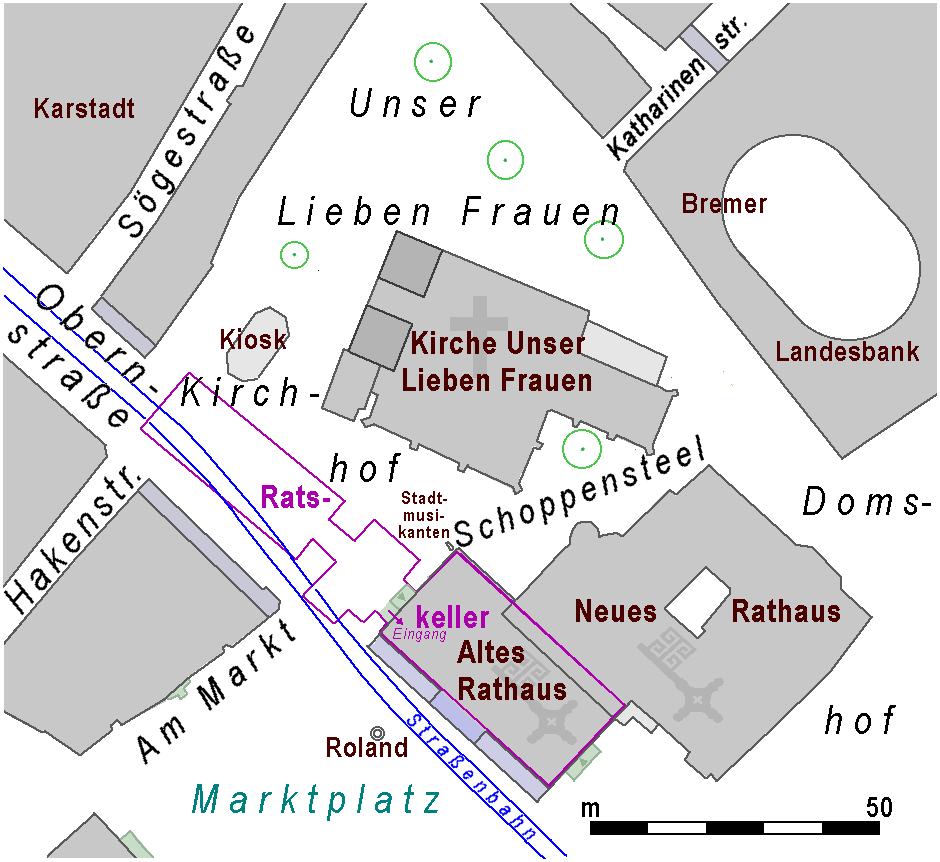
Unser-Lieben-Frauen-Kirchhof and Council cellar (without kitchen and storerooms)

For several centuries, despite its use as a market place, the soil under the square was packed with graves. In 1813, burials in the square and in the church were forbiddem for health reasons. The first office of the mutual bank "Sparkasse Bremen" was in the Alte Börse from 1825 to 1845. In 1888 the Alte Börse burnt down. When the yearly autumn market "Bremer Freimarkt" developed from a trade fair to a popular event, it was held here at first.

The Kaiser Wilhelm monument stood here from 1890/3 until it was melted down for armaments as a Metallspende (metal donation) i 1942. Today the square is surrounded on its northern and western sides by shops and offices; to the east still stands the Liebfrauenkirche with its rectory. In 1909, the decagonal Marcus Fountain, donated by Mayor Marcus, was inaugurated on the square. In the same year a monument was installed on the west façade of Liebfrauenkirche for Helmuth von Moltke.

The east side is formed by the Neues Rathaus, which was built on the location of the old Bishop's Palace in the Neo-Renaissance style, according to plans by Gabriel von Seidl and was inaugurated in 1913.

== Monuments ==
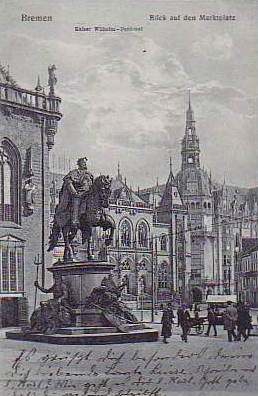
The Kaiser Wilhelm I Monument

The whole square, with the following buildings is under cultural heritage management:

- Houses 6, 8–15, 17–24, 26–30
- Liebfrauenkirche from the 1220s
- Sculpture of the Town Musicians of Bremen by Gerhard Marcks in 1951, placed in 1953 near to the 17th-century office extension of the old town hall
- Marcus Fountain from 1909
- Kirchhof 6: Deutsche Nationalbank from 1896
- Kirchhof 15: Office house, c. 1900
- Kirchhof 17: Office house Herms from 1909
- Kirchhof 26: Residential and commercial building of Rohlandseck from 1914
