= Johann Poppe =

German architect

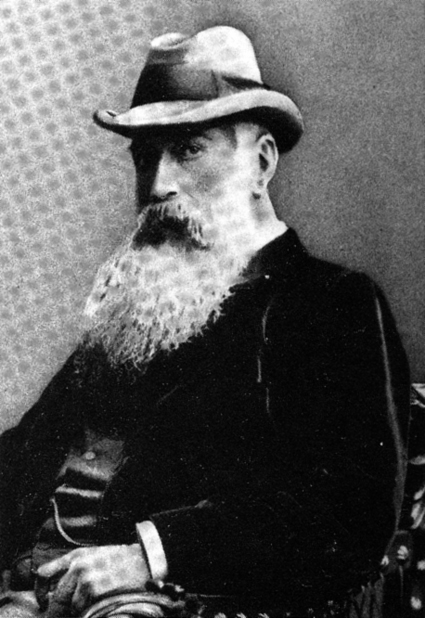
Johann Poppe in 1906

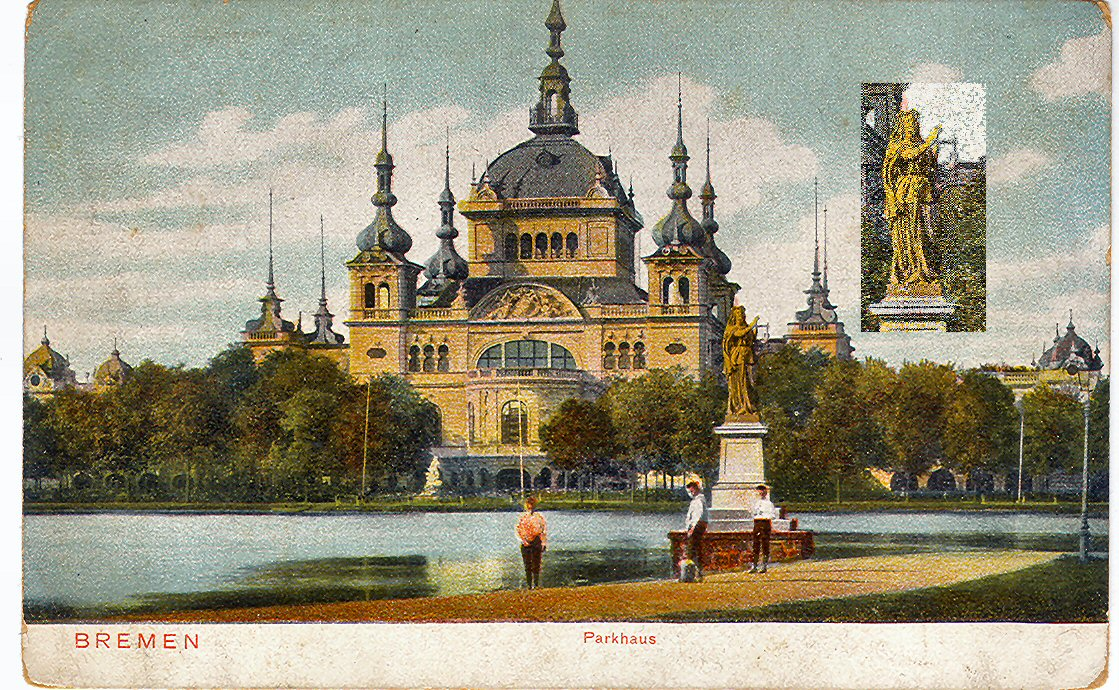
Park House, former Festival Hall of the 1900 Bremen Exhibition, on an early 20th-century postcard

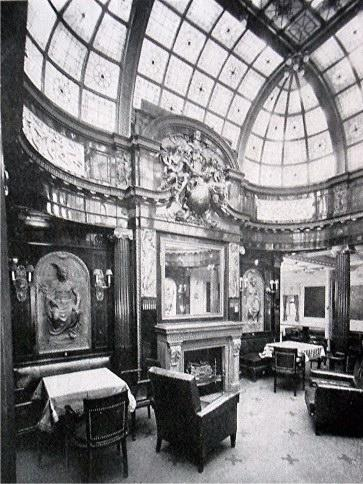
First class smoking room aboard SS Kronprinzessin Cecilie

Johann Georg Poppe (12 September 1837 – 18 August 1915), often called Johannes Poppe by English-language writers, was a prominent architect in Bremen during the German Gründerzeit and an influential interior designer of ocean liners for the Norddeutscher Lloyd. He worked in an eclectic mixture of historical revival styles sometimes called "Bremen Baroque".

== Life and career ==
Poppe was born in Bremen into a family with a heritage as architects; his father was also a cabinetmaker. From 1855 to 1859, he studied architecture at the Polytechnic School in Karlsruhe, forerunner of the University of Karlsruhe. From 1860 to 1861 he practised architecture in Berlin; he worked under Hermann Friedrich Waesemann on the Rotes Rathaus. But from 1863 on, he worked in Bremen. He was greatly influenced by six years of travel and studying in Italy, Greece, and especially France, where he lived for some time in Paris.

He acquired a reputation by building large public buildings, including the Bremen waterworks (1873), library (1896), Cotton Exchange (1902) and Rice Exchange (1904). He was chief architect for the Nordwestdeutsche Gewerbe- und Industrieausstellung (Northwest German Trade and Industry Exhibition) of 1890; the Festival Hall for this was later known as the Park House. In 1883 he oversaw the redesign of the upper chamber of the Town Hall of Bremen, including one of its three doors, and in 1903 designed new seats for the city councillors; like most of his work, this has been much altered since.

He also designed numerous villas and country houses for the elite of Bremen, mostly in the Horn and Oberneuland districts which at the time lay outside the city. Most of these have since been demolished. He rebuilt Villa Ichon and lived there for many years.

From 1881 to 1907, Poppe was chief interior designer for the ocean liners of Norddeutscher Lloyd, the first "lay" (non-marine) architect responsible for entire ships, and transformed them into floating hotels. He was responsible for the innovation of placing the first-class dining saloon in the centre of the ship, where it could be two or three decks high, lit by a giant skylight. Hired by Johann Lohmann, the director of the company, to do the interiors of the twelve Rivers class liners because of his preeminence as a designer, he first worked on the SS Elbe of 1881; only in 1906, when Poppe was seventy years old, did Lohmann's successor, Heinrich Wiegand, replace him with younger, progressive architects for some of the interiors on the SS Kronprinzessin Cecilie, but he was still responsible for her main public rooms. When Albert Ballin commissioned the first express liner for the rival Hamburg America Line, the Augusta Victoria, he hired Poppe to design the interior. The new headquarters building he designed for NDL (1901–1910) was at the time the largest building in Bremen.

Poppe's historicism was not favoured by younger architects, who worked in Jugendstil and reformist styles. At the end of his life he withdrew to his estate of Poppenhof on the right bank of the River Lesum in Burglesum, now part of Bremen, where he died in 1915. He is buried in the Riensberg Cemetery in Bremen.

== Style ==
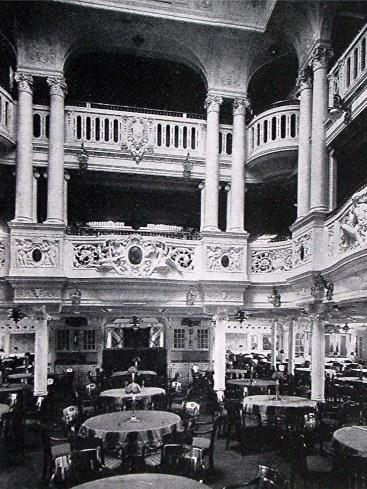
First class dining saloon aboard SS Kronprinzessin Cecilie

Poppe's designs drew most on the Renaissance and the Baroque; in the first part of his career he was greatly influenced by what he had seen in Italy and especially France. In the 1870s he began to build more in the style of the English Gothic revival. His buildings were richly ornamented inside and out; as his career progressed, he increasingly worked with large interior decorating firms, especially Bembé of Mainz, who executed his ship interiors. The result was popular with his wealthy clients; at the turn of the century, he was Bremen's most prominent architect; but after fashions changed, was outmoded. Kreyenhorst Castle was demolished in the 1920s. His ship interiors have been described as "overblown, over-decorated, and dark", as "a seagoing baroque collage of high ceilings, massive pillars, gilded balustrades, trumpeting cherubs, and gigantic statuary," as "temples of high baroque, grand galleries of an aspiration so Valkeyrian that only megalomaniacs might dally there in comfort or good conscience", by Cunard executives who visited the SS Kaiser Wilhelm der Grosse and SS Kronprinz Wilhelm in 1903 as "bizarre, extravagant and crude, loud in colour and restless in form, obviously costly, and showy to the most extreme degree" and by a contemporary American as "'two of everything but the kitchen range', then gilded." The architecture critic Walter Müller-Wulckow described the Bremen Cotton Exchange, which started to shed its profuse ornamentation after exposure to the elements, as the "crassest" manifestation of "cancerous" building styles.

== Selected works ==
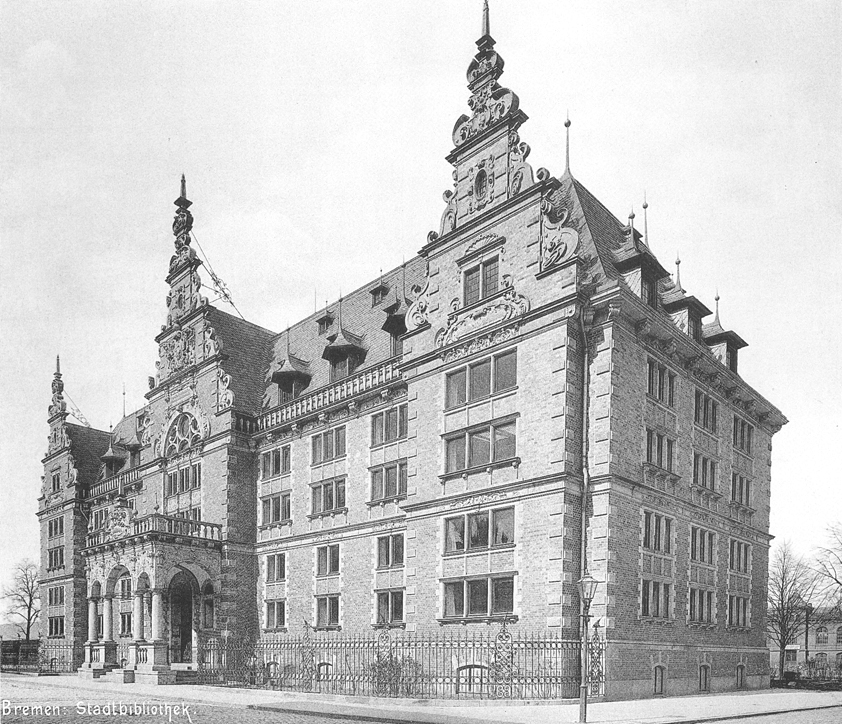
Bremen City Library (1896)

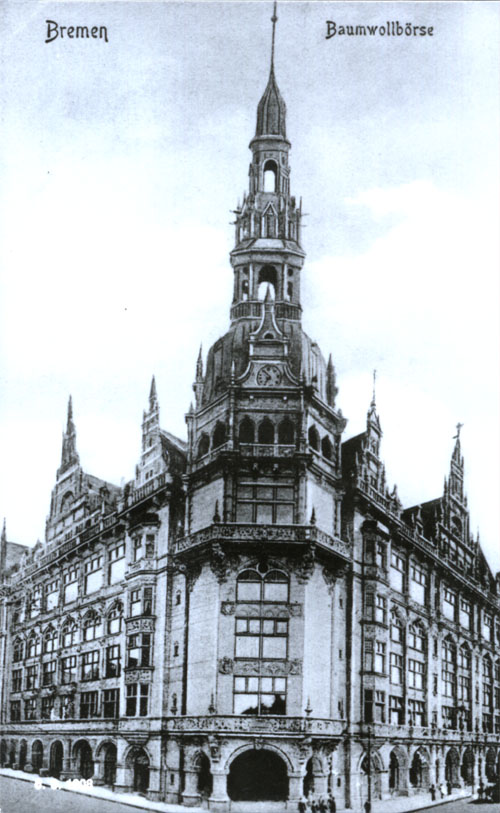
Bremen Cotton Exchange, on a 1908 postcard

=== Public buildings ===
- Bremen Waterworks (1871–73), with Dietrich Berg as technical designer, Poppe designed Bremen's first municipal waterworks, housing it in a square red-brick Gothic revival tower with four corner turrets which emulated the form of the Grand Master's Residence in the Marienburg fortress of the Teutonic Knights in East Prussia (now Malbork Castle in Poland). Initially water was drawn from the River Weser and filtered through sand; it was pumped into two storage tanks on the upper floor, with the turrets housing chimneys for the steam pumps, piping and access. The shape of the building led to the nickname umgedrehte Kommode (upside-down commode); the turrets have been shortened because of the danger of bricks falling from them. The tower has been protected as an architectural monument since 1978. Since the waterworks are no longer in service, the tower is to become the centrepiece of a projected residential development.
- Nordwestdeutsche Gewerbe- und Industrieausstellung (1890), chief designer for the largest German exposition up to that time, held jointly on 37.5 hectares of grounds in the southern part of the Bremen Bürgerpark by the Free Hanseatic City of Bremen, the Grand Duchy of Oldenburg and the Prussian Province of Hanover. Dissatisfied with the competition entries received from architects hoping to design the main buildings, the committee instead commissioned Poppe, at the time the most popular architect in Bremen, for the six main exhibit halls and the Festival Hall. These were built in only seven months, at a cost of approximately 500,000 Gold marks. All were timber, in a historical style with Baroque and Renaissance elements. After the exhibition closed in October 1890, they were demolished except for the Festival Hall, which was renamed the Park House. It was destroyed by fire in 1907, and the five-star Parkhotel Bremen now occupies the site.
- City Library (since 1927 State Library) (1896) Poppe won the contest to design the building against 34 other entrants. Poppe's building was heavily ornamented, but employed a modern layout in the stacks, with metal shelving and stepladders rather than floor divisions for minimal fire risk and maximum visibility. It was heavily damaged in the Second World War and eventually renovated and enlarged in a simplified form with a flat roof. In 1974 it was replaced by a modern building on the campus of the university; it was the home of the Übersee Museum Bremen until 1989, when it was demolished to build a multi-screen cinema.
- Bremen Cotton Exchange (1900–02) on the southeast corner of the Marketplace. Poppe won the contest to design the building in summer 1898 against 53 other entrants. His building, which cost 4.3 million marks, had a tall, ornate cupola and a heavily ornamented façade in neo-Renaissance style; however, the stucco ornamentation proved inadequately weather-resistant and the building was re-faced with sandstone in plainer style in the early 1920s. Mosaics by Hermann Prell were added to the lunettes of the entrance hall in 1906, and carved reliefs by Friedrich Lommel to the new façade and the ceiling above the stairs in 1923–24. The rear of the building was destroyed by bombing in the Second World War; after the war the cupola, which had been damaged, and the decorations were removed, the steeply pitched roof and gables were replaced with a simpler top floor, and in 1961 a multi-storey carpark was built at the rear. The building has been a protected landmark since 1993.

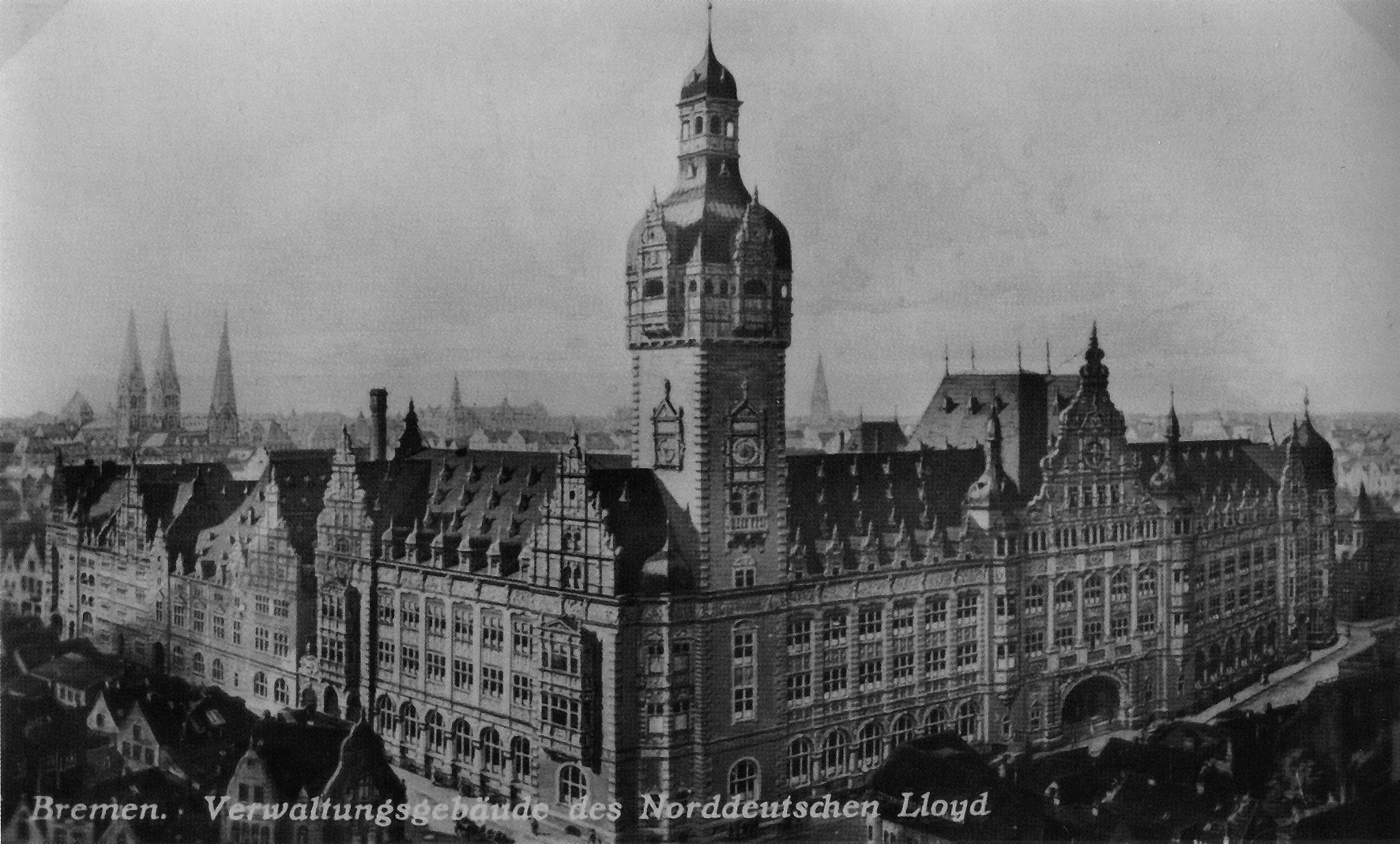
Norddeutscher Lloyd Headquarters, 1911 painting reproduced on a postcard

=== Commercial buildings ===
- Headquarters of Sparkasse Bremen bank (1881–82), in Italian Renaissance style with richly detailed façade and interior; destroyed in the Second World War.
- Norddeutscher Lloyd Headquarters (1901–10), a new headquarters occupying almost an entire quarter of the city, with the cornerstone of the final phase being laid in 1907 to celebrate the company's fiftieth anniversary. The Renaissance revival building was the largest in the city, with large gables and a bottle-shaped tower 75 metres tall. Covered in sandstone reliefs inside and out, it resembled a castle. The project coincided with an economic downturn and its costs caused problems for the company, but the building was finished on time. It was severely damaged in an air raid in October 1944; after the war the company was restarted in the cellar. The tower and gables were removed in 1953 and for a while a bierkeller operated in the cellar. In 1968 it was sold to Horten AG, who demolished it the next year to build a department store.

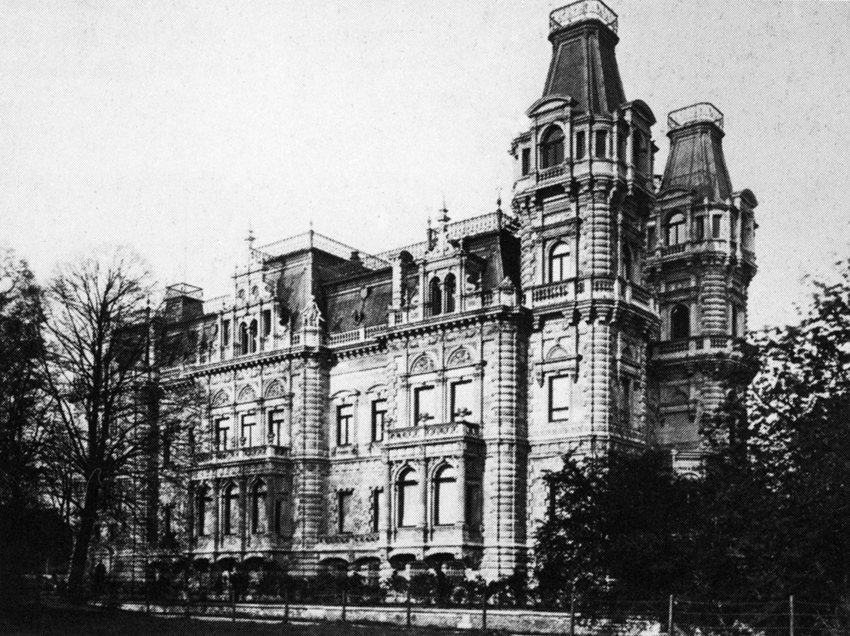
Kreyenhorst Castle in 1900

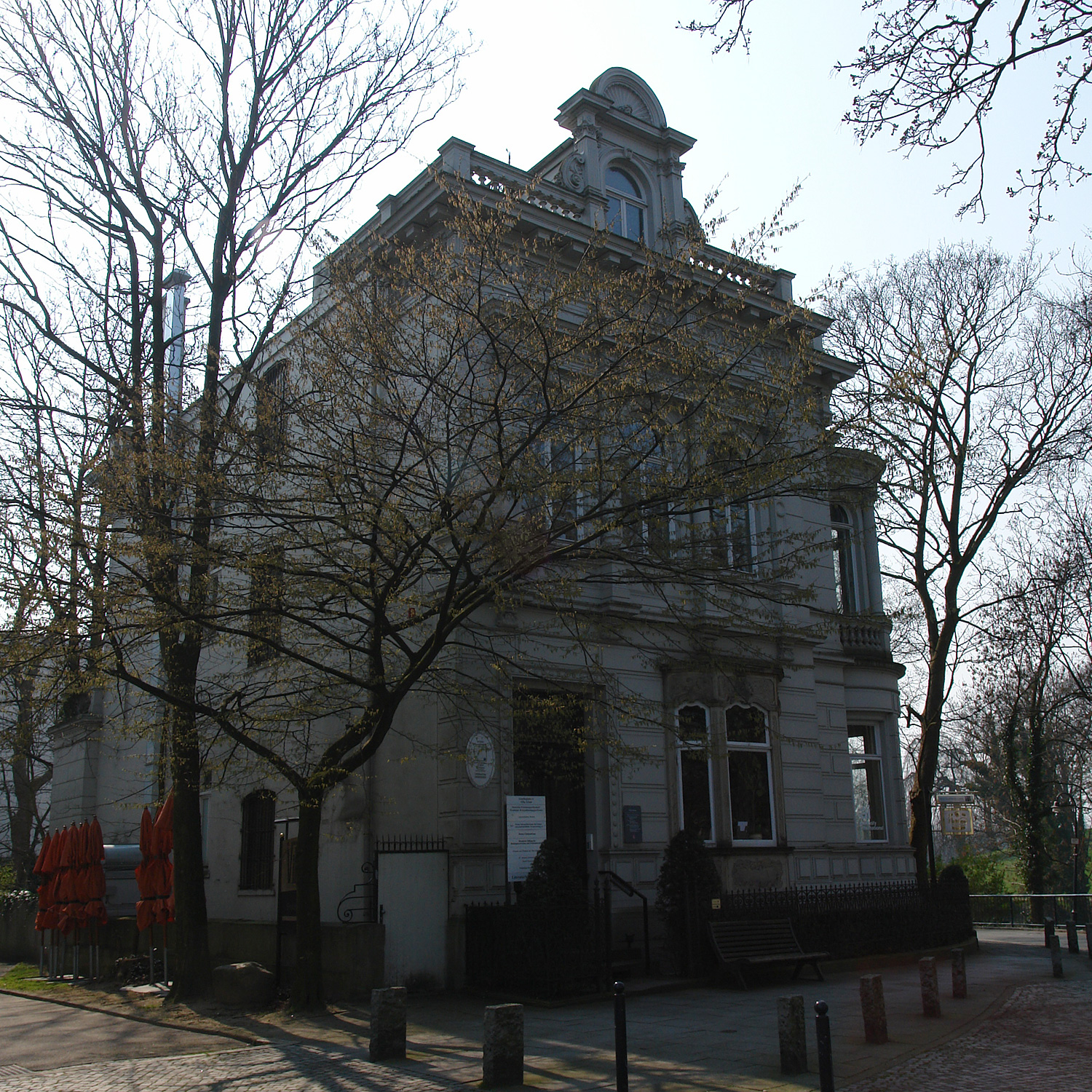
Villa Ichon, Goetheplatz façade

=== Residences ===
- Knoop Castle (1873–75), a neo-Renaissance great house in the then village of Horn built for Daniel Diederich Knoop on the site of a late 18th-century residence surrounded by extensive gardens and parkland. It was the largest and most prestigious residence in the area, and the major work of Poppe's early period, influenced by French châteaux which he had seen on his travels. He also had French craftsmen execute the interior details. Arthur Fitger created several wall paintings for a later owner, Willi Rickmer Rickmers, who also enlarged the estate and renamed the house Kreyenhorst Castle. After Rickmers' death the grounds, reduced by road building, were abandoned and the house was derelict for 20 years. In 1911 the city of Bremen bought the estate and had the house demolished in 1912; the further reduced grounds are now a public park and the only remaining building is a tea-house in the form of a classical 'temple of friendship' designed in the first half of the 19th century by Jacob Ephraim Polzin, which is now protected as an architectural monument.
- Villa Ichon, an 1849 residence in the Ostertorviertel part of Bremen on what is now the Goetheplatz next to the former city wall, which Poppe rebuilt in 1871 for R. Feuerstein, then bought in 1893, rebuilt again with extensive interior design changes, and used as his personal residence beginning in 1895. The elaborate façade is neo-Baroque; the interior features gold leaf on the ceilings, mosaic floors, and wall paintings by Arthur Fitger. On the ground floor there is a marble fireplace and a stove of blue and white Meissen faïence. After being the residence of the director of the adjacent Theater am Goetheplatz, the office of the lawyer Ichon who gave it its current name, and office and storage space for the theatre, it was taken over by the city and threatened with redevelopment. Klaus Hübotter, a Bremen patron of the arts, and Die Initiativgruppe zur Erhaltung der Villa Ichon (The Action Group for the Preservation of Villa Ichon), saved the building and restored it, receiving the German Prize for Landmark Preservation in 1984 for their efforts, and it is now administered by the Verein der Freunde und Förderer der Villa Ichon in Bremen e. V. (Association of Friends and Supporters of Villa Ichon in Bremen) and houses a restaurant and a number of peace groups, including Amnesty International and the German Peace Society. Since 1983, the Association have awarded an annual €5,000 Villa Ichon Culture and Peace Prize. The house has been listed as an architectural monument by the city of Bremen since 1973.
- Frerichs residence (1882) in one of the new quarters of the city, in a highly decorated neo-Renaissance style.

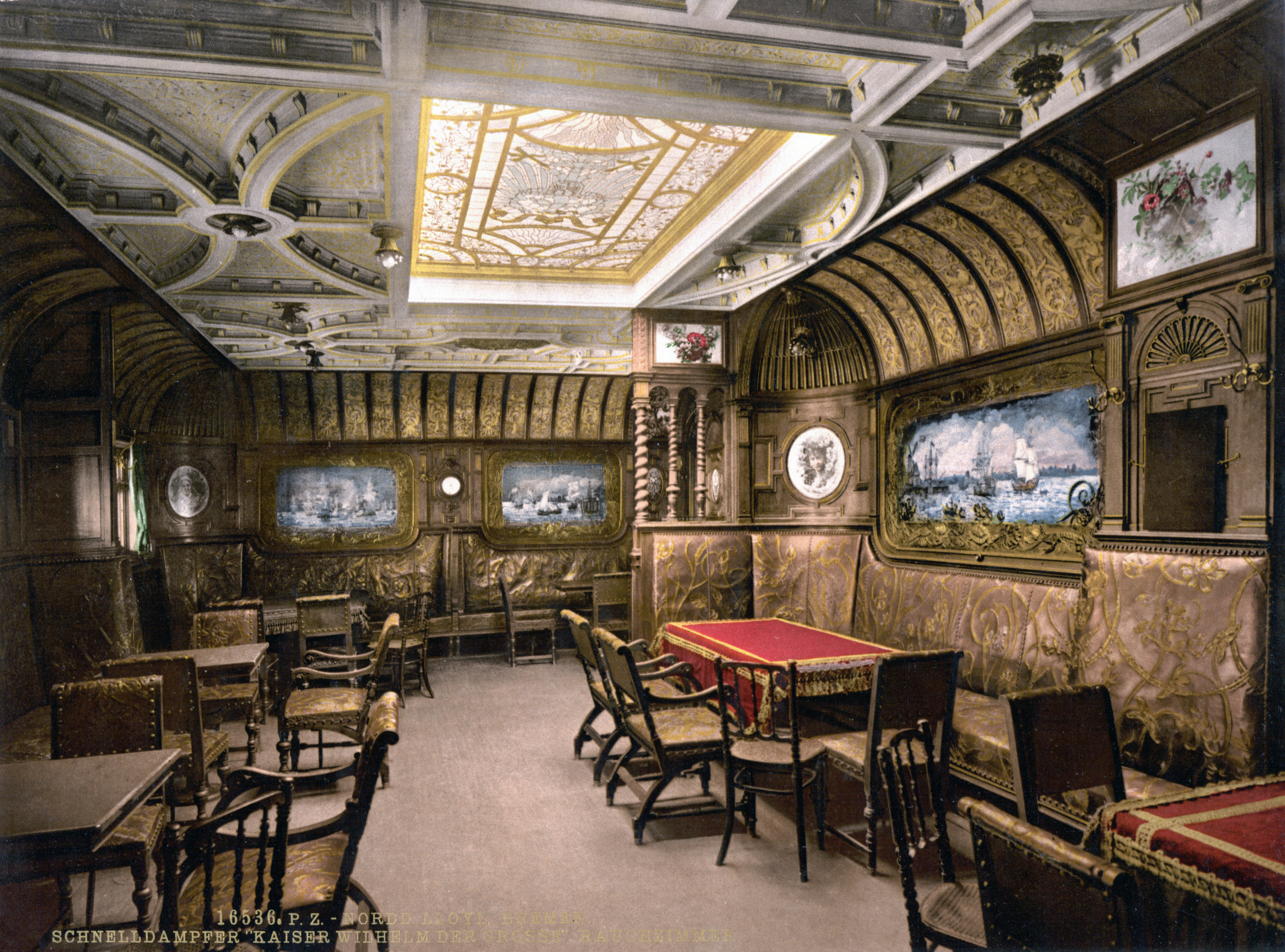
Smoking room aboard SS Kaiser Wilhelm der Grosse

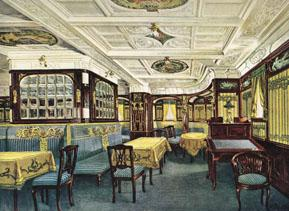
First class reading and writing room aboard SS Kronprinz Wilhelm

=== Interior design of ocean liners ===
- Lahn (1887): the first ship in which Poppe's neo-Baroque grandeur was clearly manifest.
- Augusta Victoria (1888): for the Hamburg America Line's first express liner, Albert Ballin hired Poppe, the Norddeutscher Lloyd's interior designer, because of his proven track record designing luxury liners.
- Kaiser Wilhelm der Grosse (1897): a ship described as "a sea-going boast", with ornate neo-Baroque architecture that "overwhelmed and overawed", and portraits of Bismarck, von Moltke and Kaiser Wilhelm I himself in the first class dining saloon. This was the first liner with four funnels, arranged in two pairs so that the public rooms amidships could be lighted by skylights. Poppe designed a "heavy, dark" smoking room in German Baroque style and a French Rococo ladies' drawing room in white and gold with light blue upholstery.
- Kaiser Wilhelm II (1904): Neo-Baroque interiors, including a three-level First Class dining saloon which ran the entire width of the ship and was decorated with carved festooned shields. The room also had a life-size portrait of the Kaiser, between "allegoric figures of loyalty and sagacity" and cherubs representing "the Trades, Commerce, and Shipping", all upheld by gilded eagles.
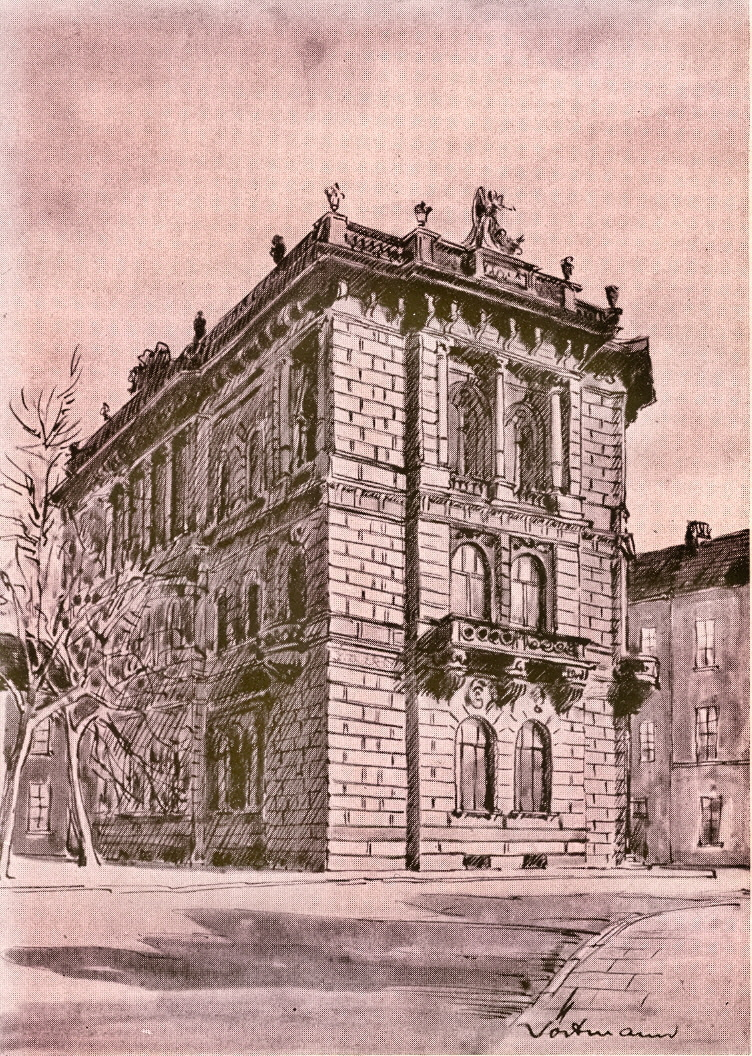
Sparkasse Bremen bank (1882)

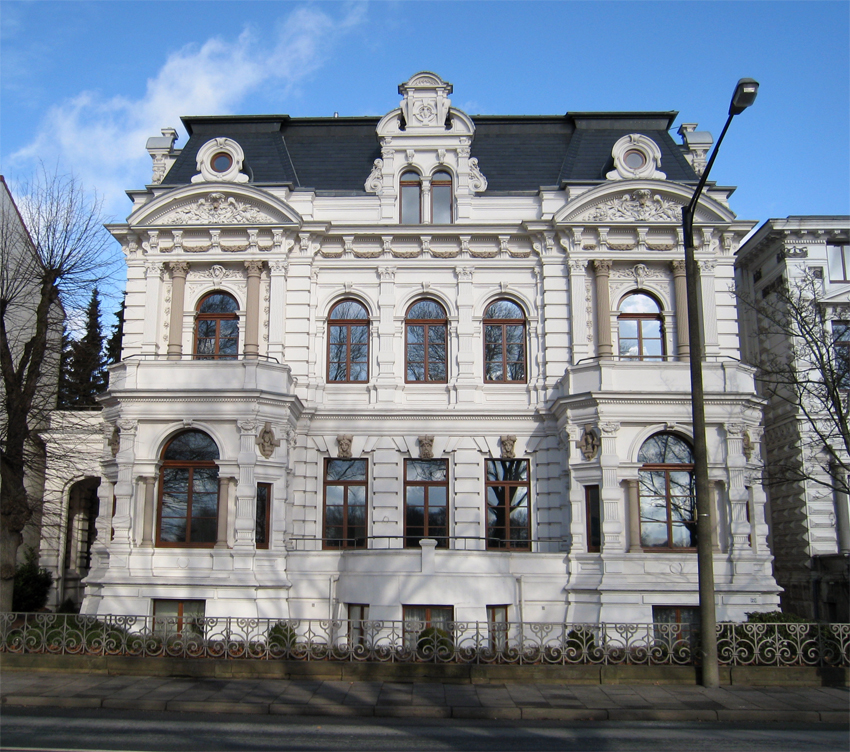
Frerichs residence (1882)

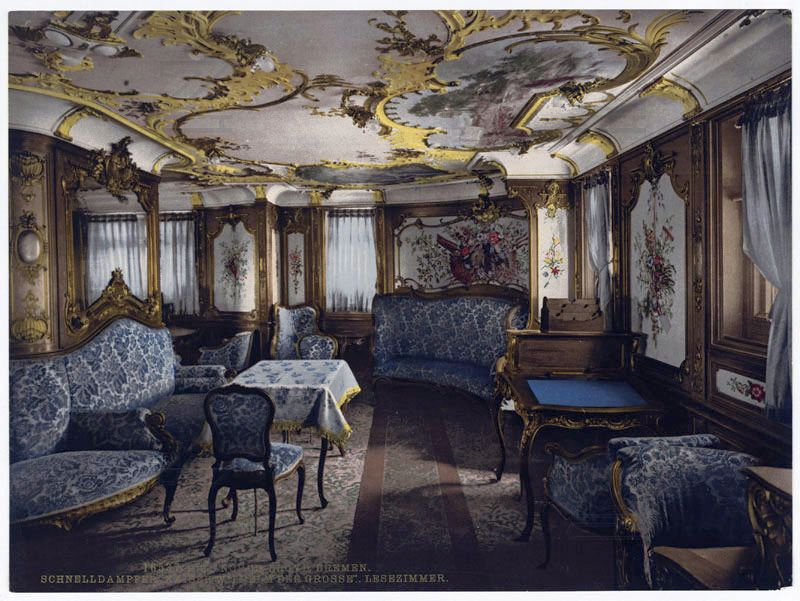
Ladies' drawing room, SS Kaiser Wilhelm der Grosse

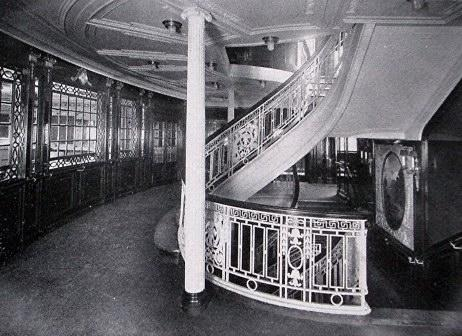
Grand staircase, SS Kronprinzessin Cecilie

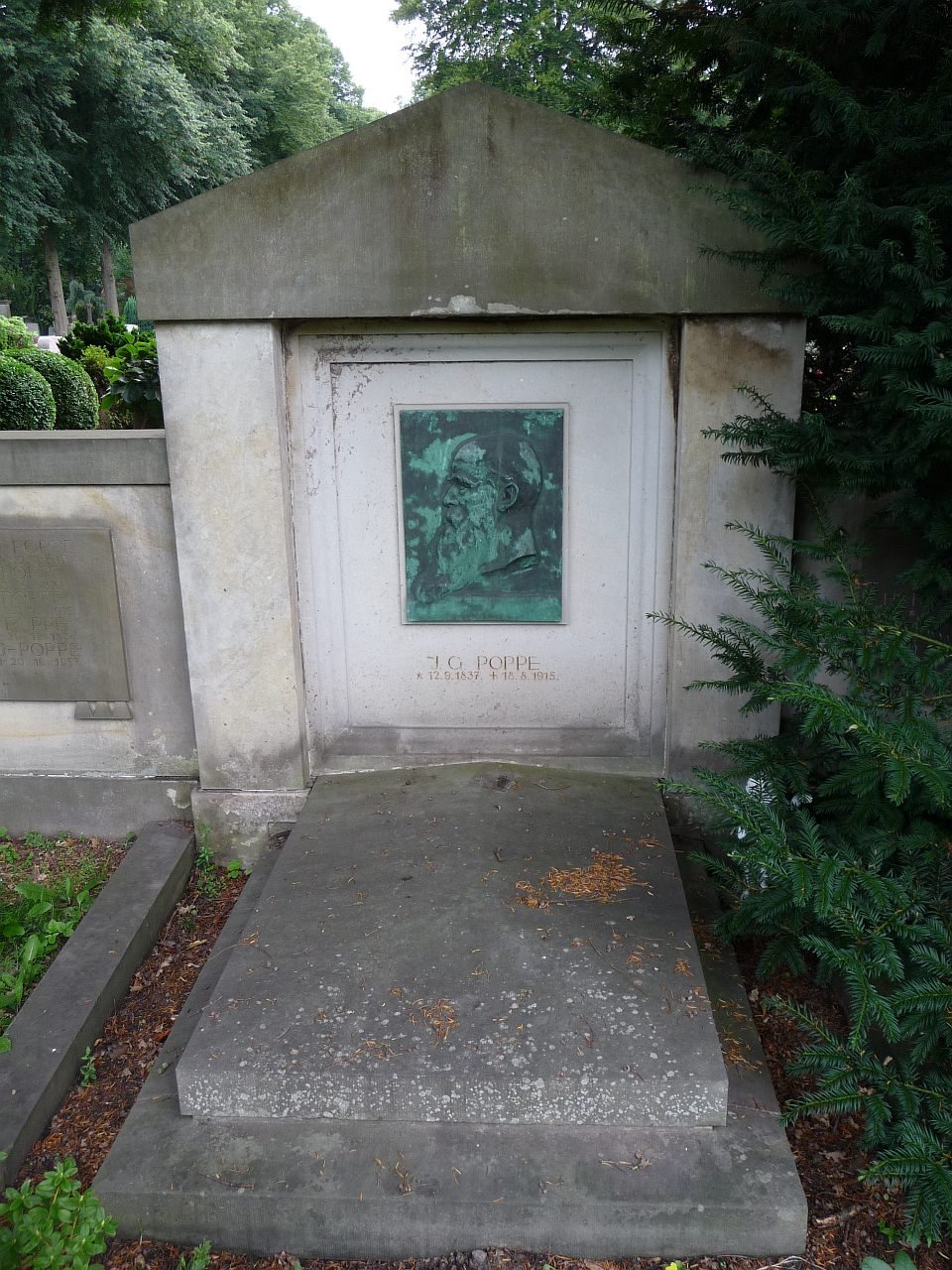
Poppe's grave in the Riensberg cemetery
