= Bremen Cotton Exchange =

Coordinates: 53°04′28″N 8°48′26″E

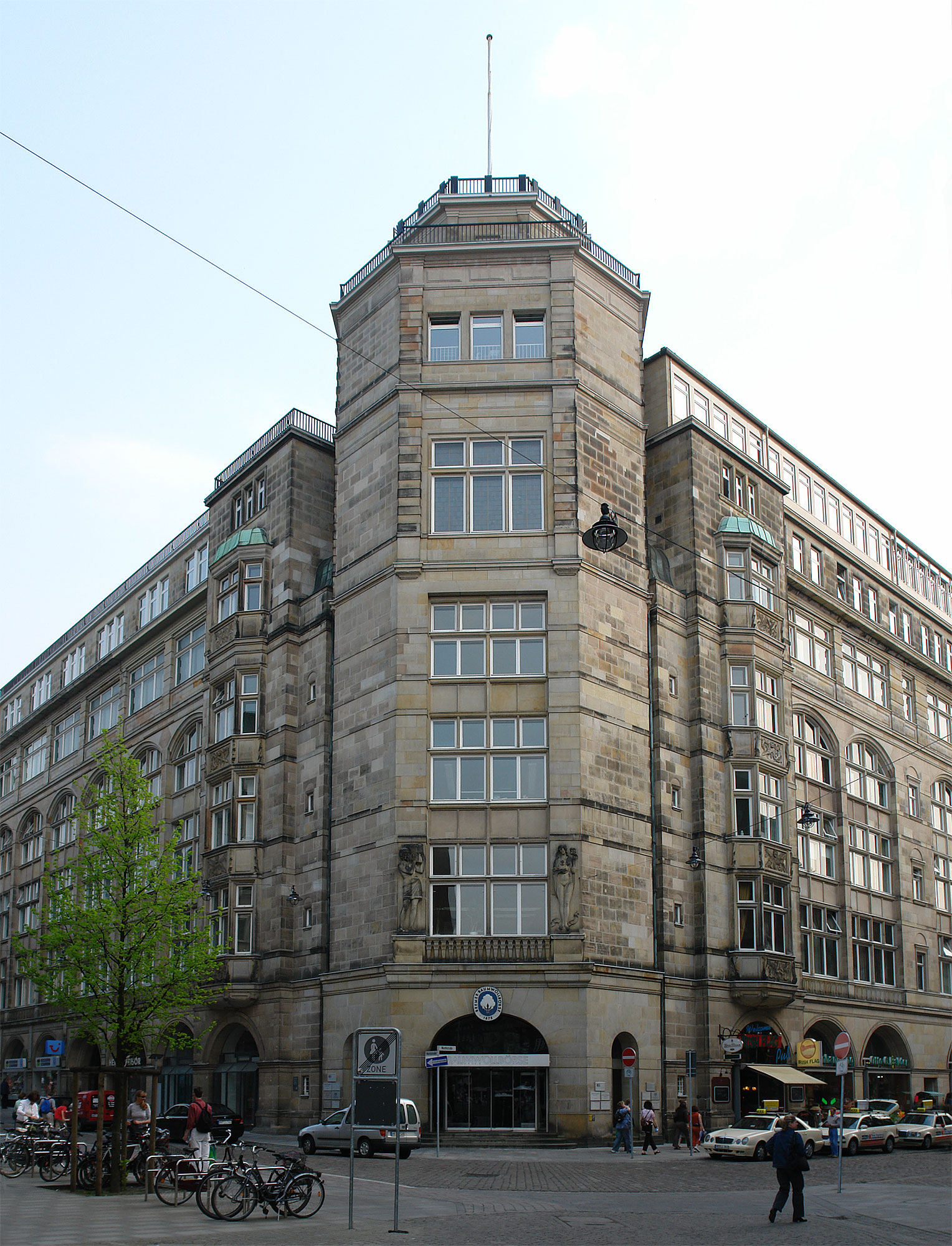
Bremen Cotton Exchange

The Bremen Cotton Exchange (German: Bremer Baumwollbörse) was built in 1902 on the market square in Bremen, Germany, to house the offices of the city's cotton exchange founded in 1872. Johann Poppe's Neo-Renaissance facades and carefully finished interiors can still be seen today.

== Background ==
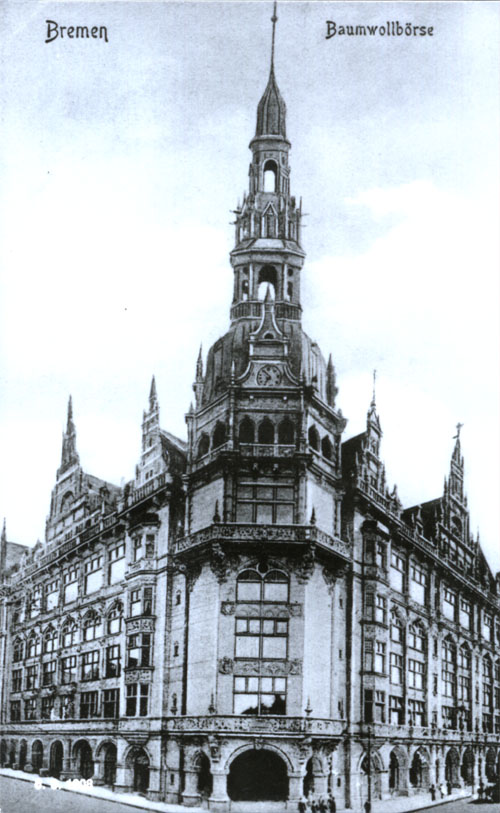
Original building,1908

Since 1788, when it first arrived in Bremen on emigrant ships returning from North America, cotton has been an important commodity for the city. In 1894, over a million bales of cotton were unloaded, reaching a maximum of 2.6 million bales in 1927. In 1872, the Committee for the Cotton Trade (Komité für den Baumwollhandel) was created to promote the interests of those involved in the cotton market. Banks, shipping companies, cotton mills and insurance companies later became members too. In 1900, work began on the construction of the Cotton Exchange Building in the centre of Bremen. The exchange allowed the trading of Futures in 1914, but the First World War and the ensuing inflation prevented their re-establishment until 1926.

The exchange closed again for the Second World War. During the war, the rear part of the building was destroyed in RAF bombing attacks on Bremen, and the steeple-like tower in front was severely damaged and later pulled down. After repairs, the exchange reopened in 1956. In 1961, a multistory parking garage was built where the rear part of the building had been.

Even today, the "Rules of the Bremen Cotton Exchange" serve as a useful reference in drawing up contracts and solving disputes in the international cotton market. The Bremer Baumwollbörse still has over 200 members (2014) but its offices are now in Wachtstraße.

== Architecture ==
Johann Poppe (1837–1915), who had gained a reputation for his skill in designing some of Bremen's large public buildings including the waterworks (1873) and the library (1896), was selected as the architect for the Cotton Exchange. Located on the corner of Wachtstraße and the Marktplatz, the building which originally had five storeys was completed in 1902. It combined the latest structural techniques (becoming Bremen's first steel-framed building) with a high degree of functionality and an imposing Neo-Renaissance facade. The architecture critic Walter Müller-Wulckow described the Bremen Cotton Exchange, which started to shed its profuse ornamentation after exposure to the elements, as the "crassest" manifestation of "cancerous" building styles. As a result of weathering, the richly decorated outer walls of sandstone had to be almost completely renewed from 1922 to 1924 under the supervision of Otto Blendermann.

Its carefully designed interiors can still be seen today. Of particular note are the stairway with railings by Hermann Prell and the glass mosaics in the main entrance by Puhl & Wagner.

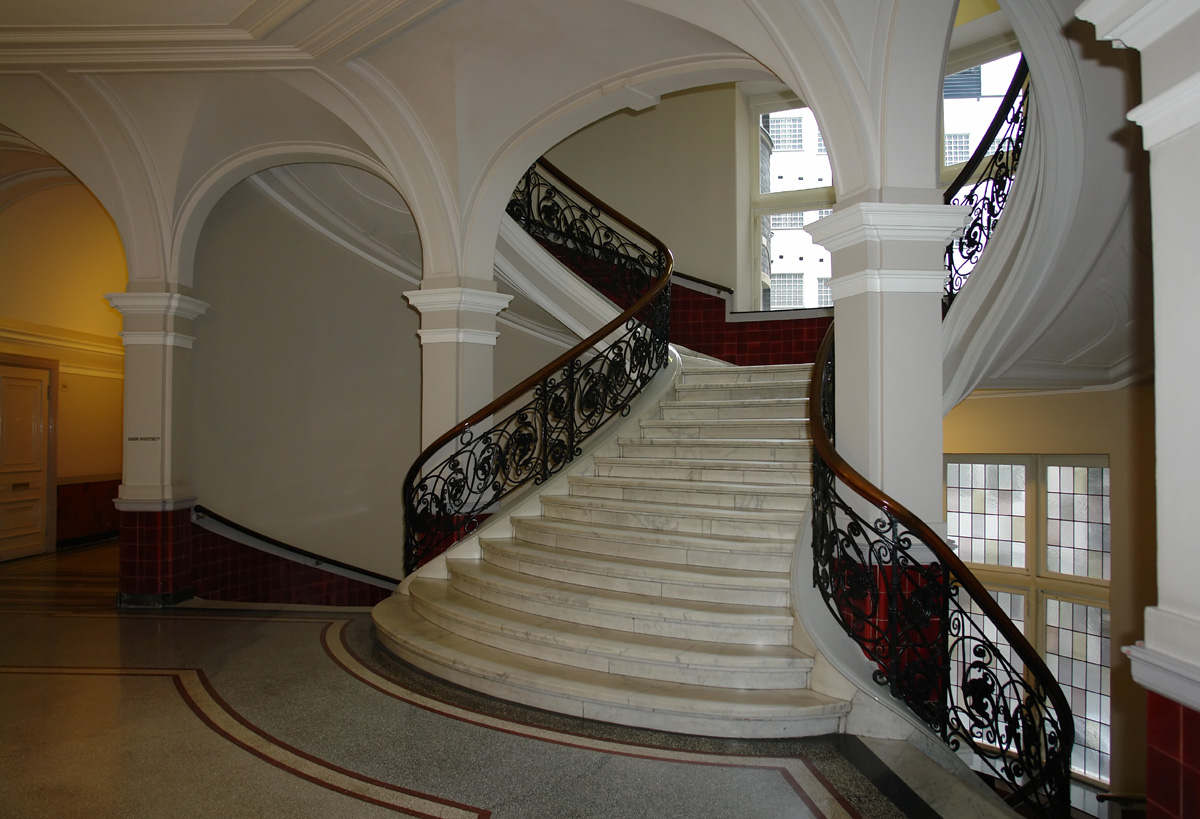
Staircase

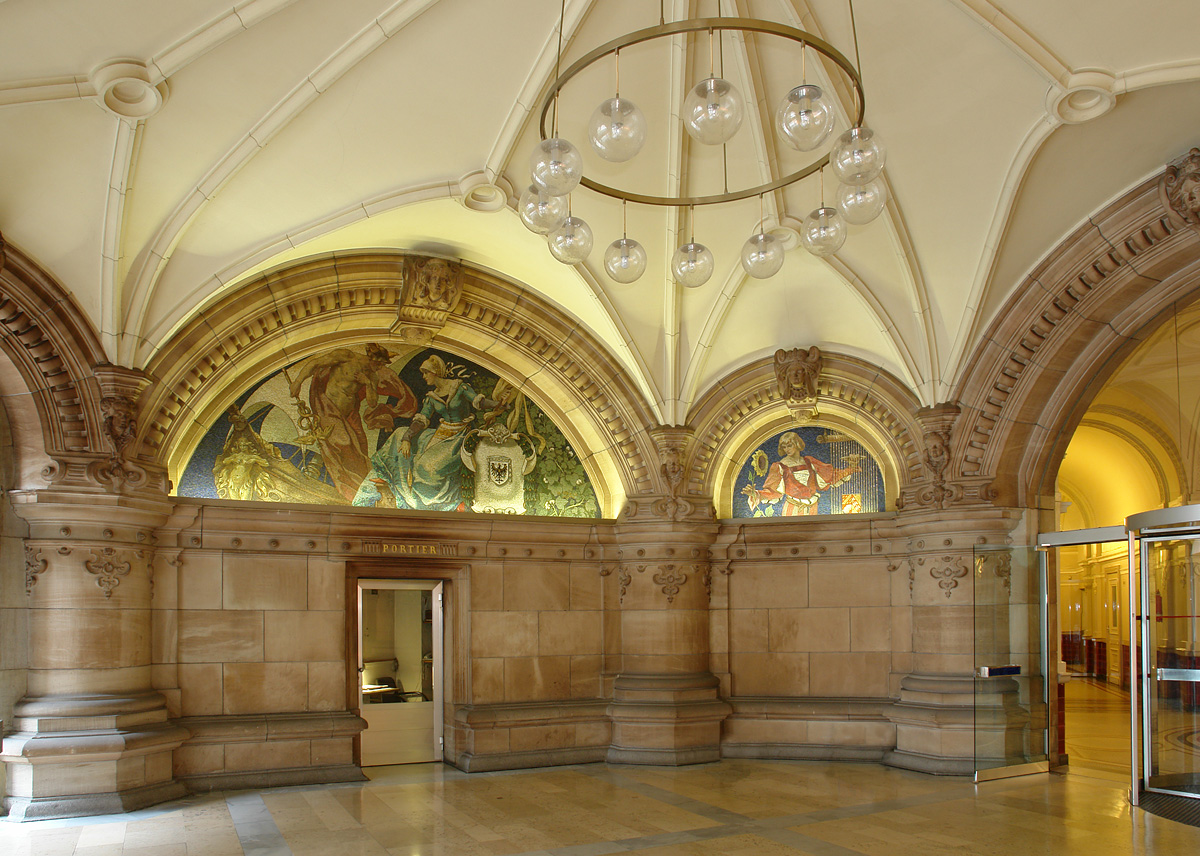
Entrance hall mosaics

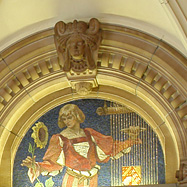
Mosaic detail

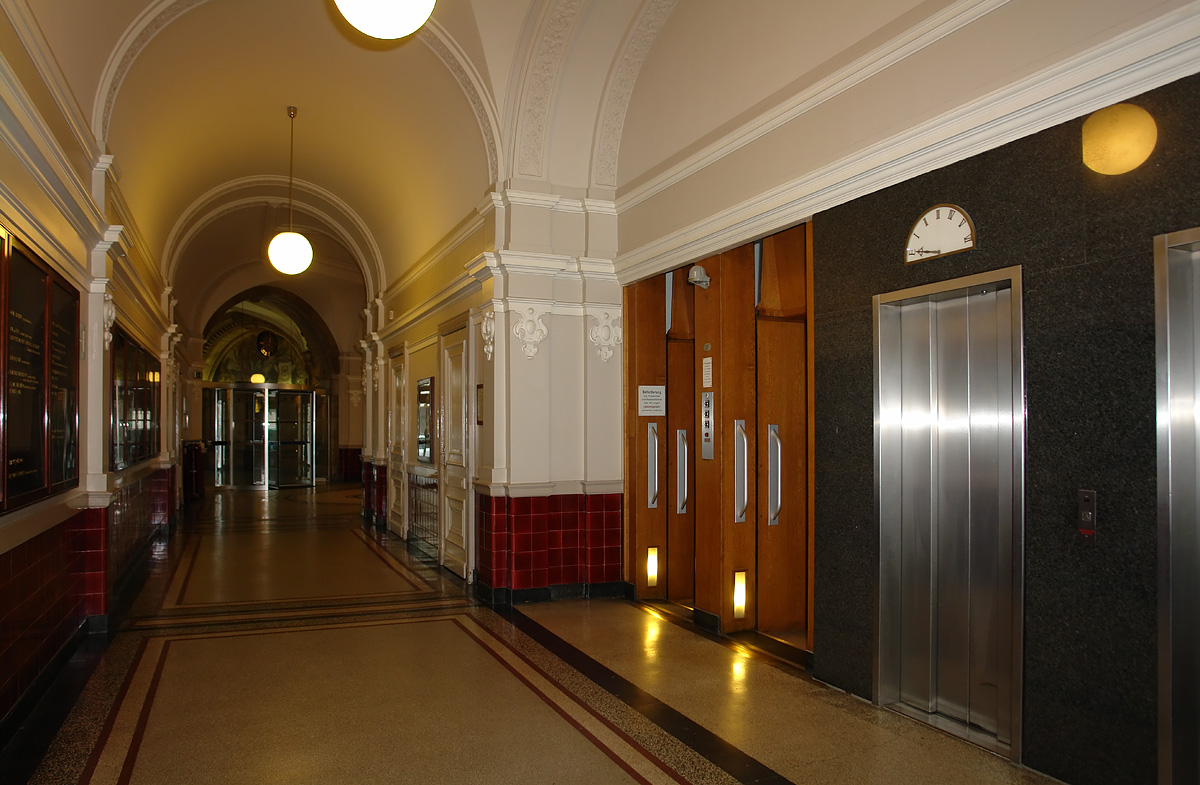
Ground-floor corridor

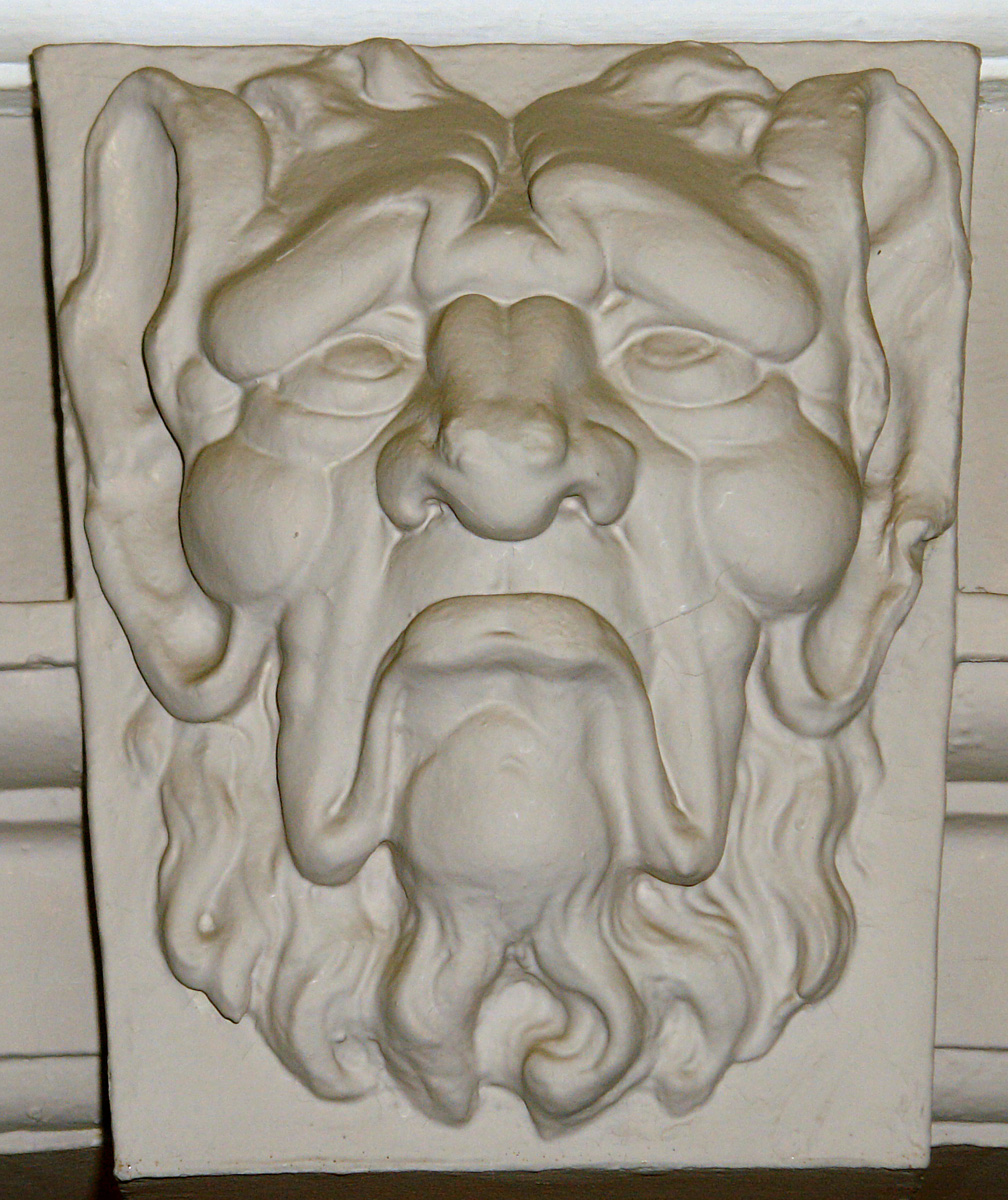
Relief
