= Church of Our Lady, Bremen =

Evangelical Protestant church in Bremen, Germany

Kirche Unser Lieben Frauen
- Liebfrauenkirche
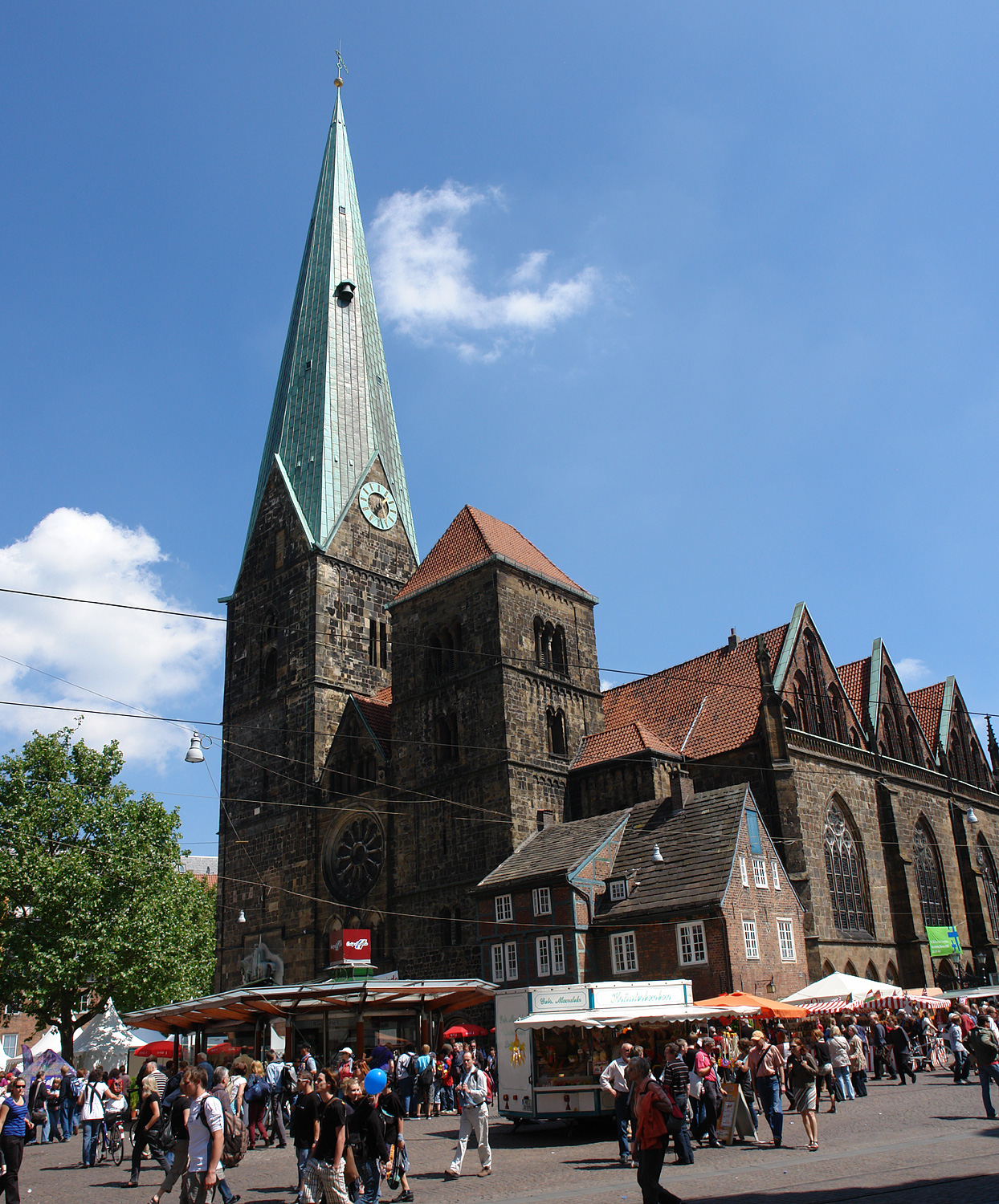

Religion
- Affiliation: protestant

Location
- Location: Unser Lieben Frauen Kirchhof 27 Bremen, Germany
- Interactive map of Kirche Unser Lieben Frauen
- Coordinates: 53°04′35″N 8°48′27″E

Specifications
- Length: 59 meters (194 feet)
- Width: 34 meters (112 feet)
- Spire: 2
- Spire height: 84.2 meters (276 feet)

Website
- www.kirche-bremen.de Unser Lieben Frauen

The Church of Our Lady (German: Kirche Unser Lieben Frauen) is an Evangelical Protestant church situated northwest of the Market Square in Bremen, Germany. Like Bremen Cathedral, today's building dates from the 13th century. The brightly coloured stained-glass windows are the work of the French artist Alfred Manessier. In 1973, the church was listed under the monument protection act.

== History and architecture ==
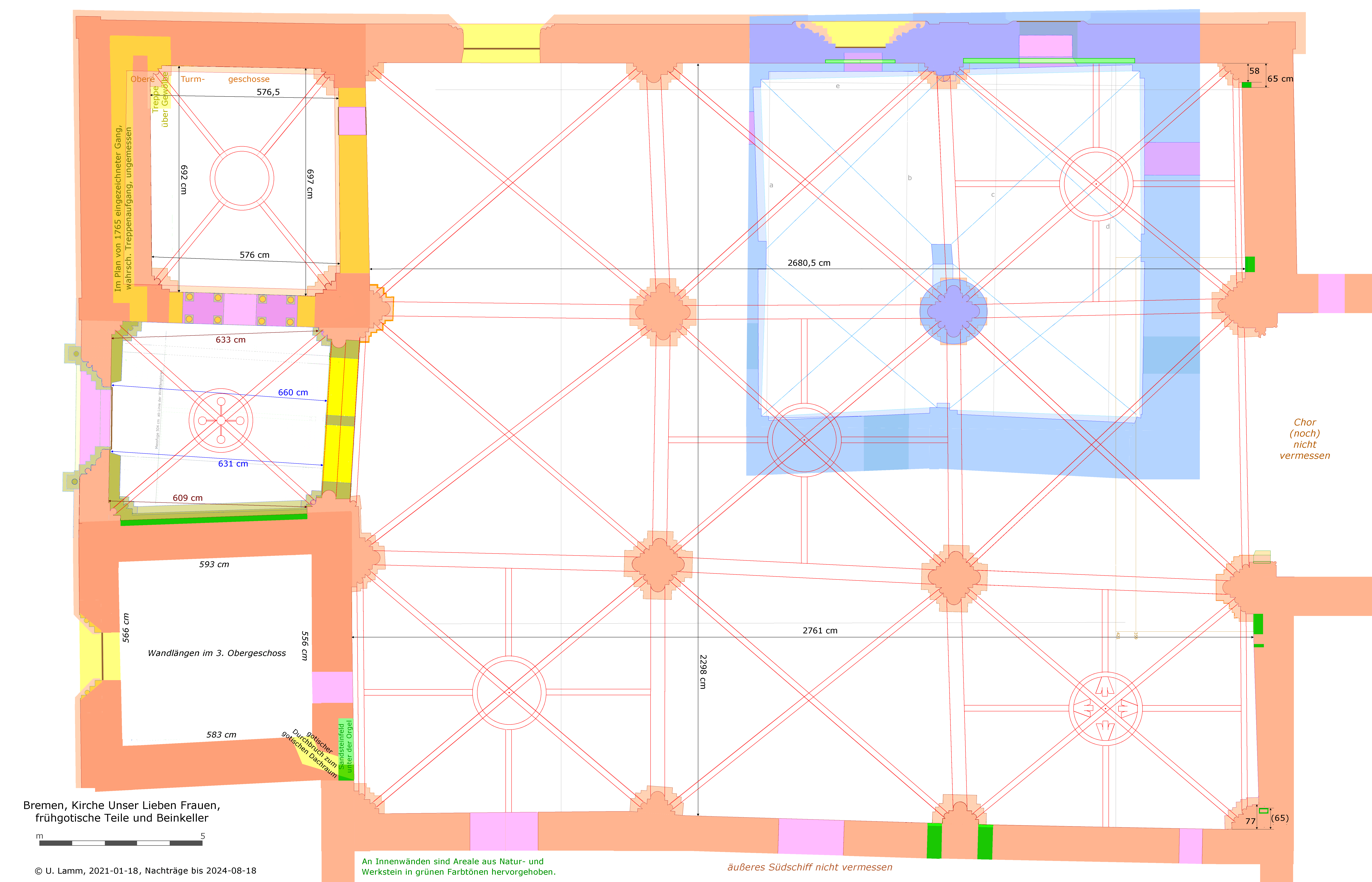
Footplan of the southern tower and the Early Gothic parts (orange) and the ossuary (blue). Green marks stone on walls inside the nave.

Already bishop Willerich, in late 9th century, had built a third church beside the cathedral and the tomb chapel for his predecessor Willehad. But the first church definitely on the actual ground was built by archbishop Unwan (ruling 1013 to 1029) and dedicated to Saint Vitus. It served as market church of the city and later also as church of the city council. Adam of Bremen recorded it as basilica sancti Viti in a time, before architectural terminology was developed, but there is no evidence that its shape had been a basilica at any time.

In 1220 it was mentioned as Church of St Mary, for the first time. In 1219, Gerhard II had become archbishop. It is supposed that he changed the dedication and almost at the same time began to rebuild the church as a hall church. The only remainders of the buildings before are the southern tower, the ossuary cellar and parts of the inner side of the northern wall above the ossuary. Therefore, the footplans of the preceding churches are unknown. The ossuary had been built with two accesses (as typical for crypts), but its positions seems not to be typical for a crypt.

In the 1220s, the church was built in early Gothic style, with Angevin vaults. The core was a hall of three to three bays with four pillars. In the east it had a chancel of one bay, and the lateral vessels ended with apses. North of the old tower it has an original additional bay and in the northwestern edge a second tower, larger than the Romanesque old one. Originally, the ground flour of the 1220s tower was open to the nave, on two sides. In the following century, it was cut off by walls, as it had to house the archive of the city council, known as the Tresekammer.

At about 1343 (d), the nave was enlarged by addition of a second southern aisle, of the same width and height as the older vessels. In 1461 (d), the old chancel was replaced by long choir of three bays. The apses at the side vessels disappeared.

In the 1860s, the additional vessel was cut off by Gothic Revival windows, and it was divided into a ground flour with small rooms and the Christophorus-Saal (St Christopher's hall) in the upper storey (with high Gothic Revival windows). In the 1890s, a new western portal was opened between the two towers. In 1924, the ground flour of the northern tower was converted into a war memorial – which was re-designed in pacifist purpose, recently.

== Interior ==
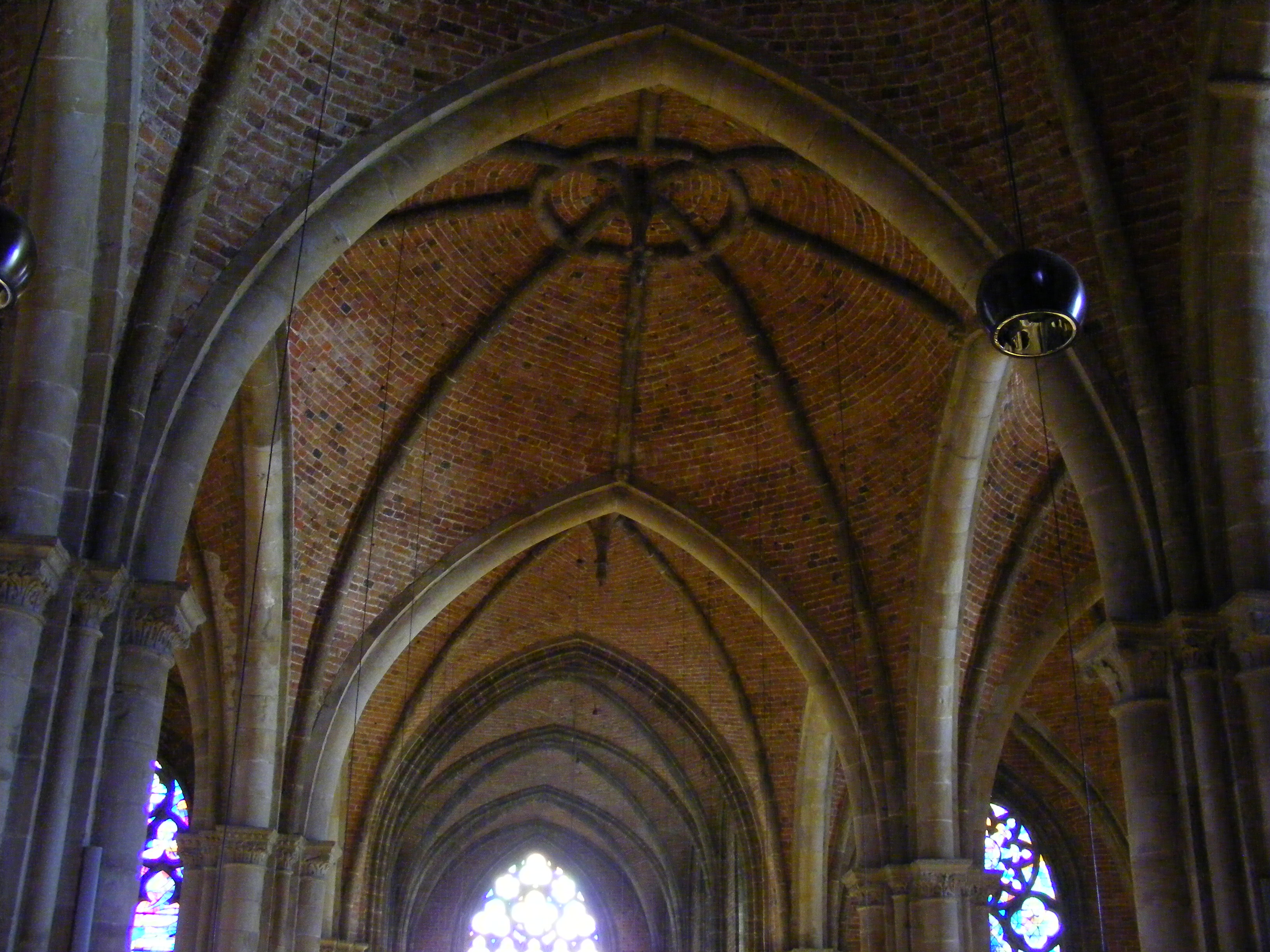
Vaults of central nave and choir

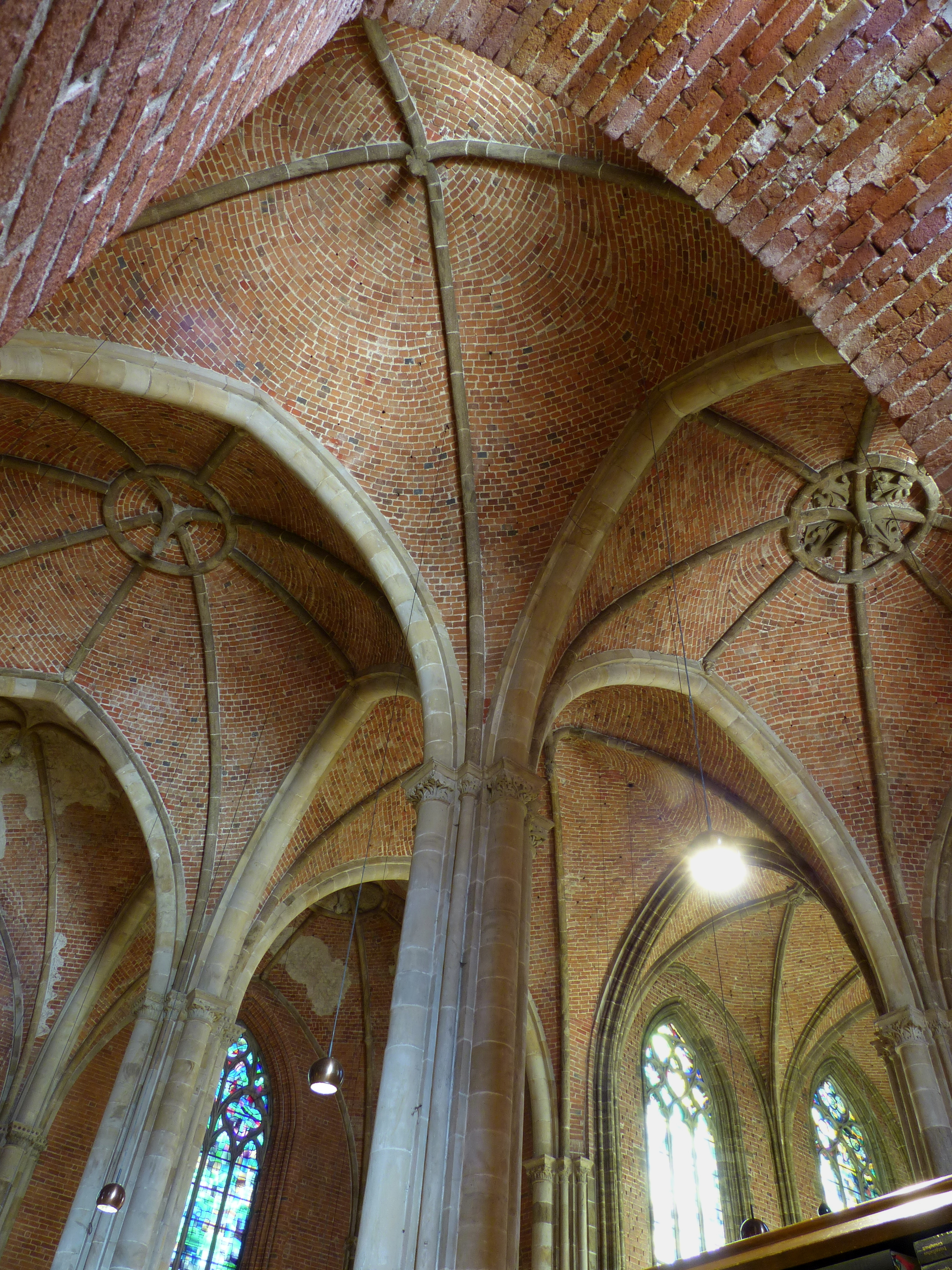
Right – the most decorated southeastern vault, left – the central vault, background – the long choir

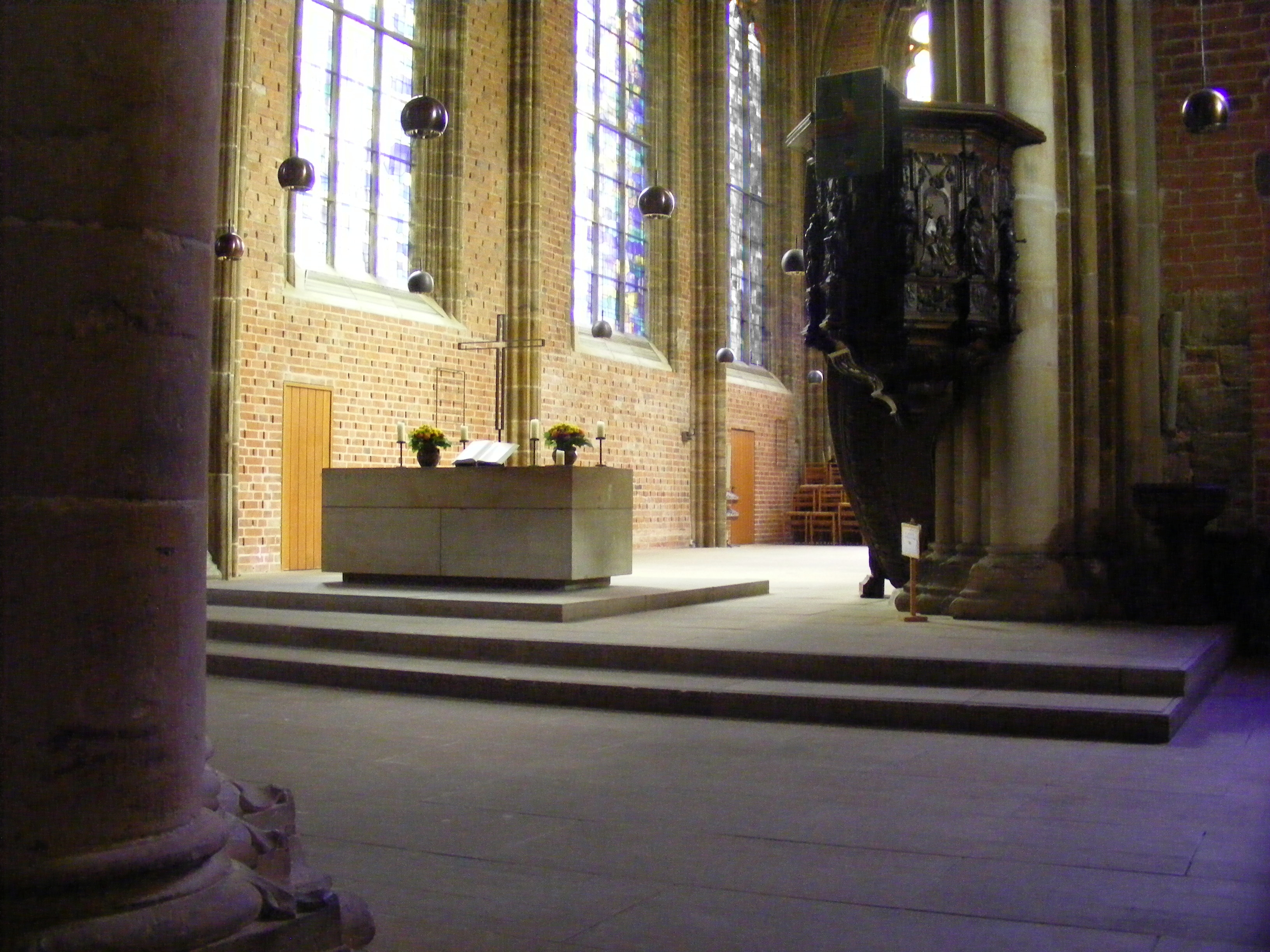
The moderate altar fits the principles of Reformed churches

The interior was damaged by fire in 1944, but much less than the other medieval churches of the city. When the new organ was installed in 1953, the acoustics were so poor that in 1958 the city assigned Dieter Oesterlen to manage the church's refurbishment. The residual medieval plastering and the remains of the frescos were removed, leaving plain brick walls. In 1966, the French artist Alfred Manessier was charged with redesigning the 19 windows that had been destroyed during the Second World War. Inspired by verses from the Bible, he embarked first on the design of the four main windows, employing brightly coloured stained glass representations with expressive linear patterns. Together they depict various manifestations of the Word of God. At the end of the aisle to the north of the altar, the Christmas Window is inspired by "The Word became flesh" (John 1:14), while the Pentecost Window at the east end of the chancel is inspired by the Miracle of Tongues (Acts 2). The Sermon Window symbolises the preached word: "We are ambassadors for Christ" (2 Corinthians 5:20) while the Virgin Mary Window, a rose window at the opposite end of the church draws on the Christmas story: "Mary kept all these sayings, pondering them in her heart" (Luke 2:19). With the assistance of François Lorin from Chartres, Manessier completed his work in 1979.

== Name ==
Since 1220, the church has been named after Mary, the mother of Jesus Christ. This name (Church of Our Lady) has been used by more than 250 churches in the world and by more than 150 religious orders or convents in Germany.

In Bremen, the name is widely used:

- the space around the church is named Unser-Lieben-Frauen-Kirchhof
- there used to be a cellar, northwest of the church, named Liebfrauenkeller, which was used as a restaurant between 1948 and 2002 (ice cream parlour, confectionery Schnuchel, restaurant Liebfrauenkeller, Disco New Yorker.
- There used to be a school named Liebfrauenschule which was taken over by the city in 1901 and subsequently abandoned and knocked down. The school was situated in the second aisle of the church and extended into an annexe at the western side of the church.
- The Liebfrauen-Restaurant, between 1871 and 1891 at the northwest corner of the Liebfrauen-churchyard. When the so-called 18th century Bickhaus was knocked down, the restaurant moved to the corner of Sögestrasse and Queerenstrasse. It was destroyed by bombing in 1944.

== Dimensions ==
The Liebfrauenkirche has two steeples. Together with the weather vane which has a height of 6 m (20 ft), the north steeple is 84.2 m (276 ft), the third tallest steeple in the city (the tallest being the two cathedral steeples). It has a width of 9.4 m (31 ft). The church clock is situated at a height of 37.4 m (123 ft). The smaller south steeple has a height of 30.5 m (100 ft) and a width of 8.3 m (27 ft). The roof reaches a height of 22.9 m (75 ft). The total length of the church amounts to some 59 m (194 ft) and the total width, 34 m (112 ft).

== Sculptures ==
The flour of the church comprises some medieval tombstones, but there are no medieval sculptures, if there had been any, they have been removed during the reformation. But there are two sculptures from the 19th century.

=== Moltke-monument at the north tower ===
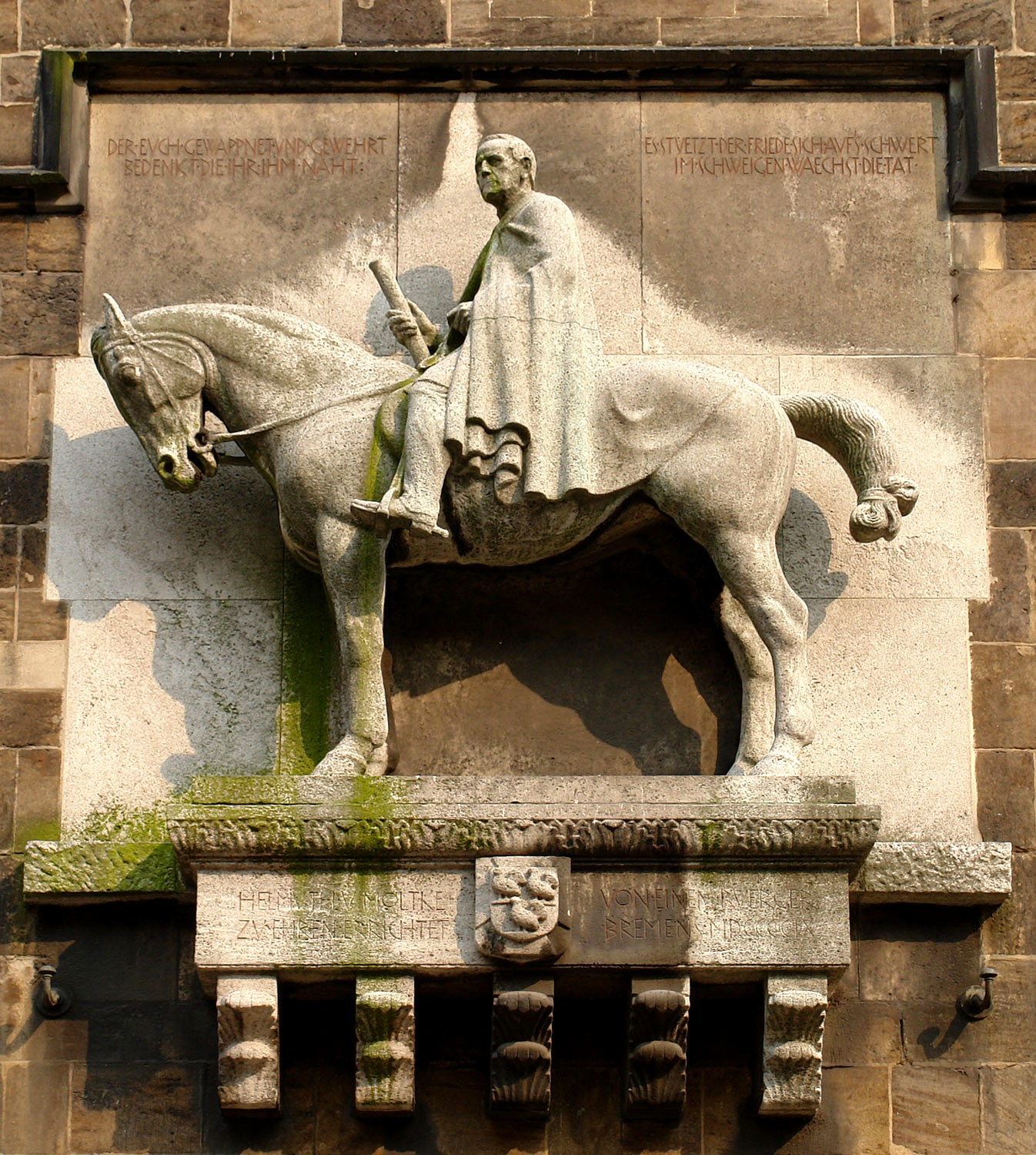
Helmut von Moltke on the northern facade

The equestrian sculpture on the wall of the southern steeple was placed there in 1909. It shows the Prussian field marshal Helmut Graf von Moltke and was donated by the banker Bernhard Loose from Bremen, who already died on 31 March 1902. It was designed by Heinrich Jennen from Berlin-Charlottenburg and sculpted by Hermann Hahn of Munich. Like the sculpture itself, the inscription above it expresses the militarism of the period:

"He who armed and protected you
consider this, when you approach him:
Peace has to be supported by the sword
if you remain silent, the evil deed will grow."

=== War memorial ===
After World War I, the architect Otto Blendermann from Bremen and the sculptor Friedrich Lommel from Munich created a war memorial in honour of the dead soldiers of Bremen garrison. In 2011, it was converted into a memorial for all victims of all wars. Since then, panes of opalescent glass on the walls bear a biblical admonition to keep peace, and panes of opalescent glass hiding the sculpture bear the names of the soldiers.

== Organ ==
The organ was built in 1953 by Paul Ott (Göttingen). At the time, the steeple bay had been bricked up. As a result, the organ was situated on the west wall of the bay. In 1964, it was reinstalled in a new casing on the south aisle's west wall. The last readjustment took place in 1984 by the organ builder Karl Schuke in Berlin. At that time, the disposition was slightly changed.

== Bells ==
The church has only one bell in the south tower, cast in the 13th or 14th century. Apart from that, there is only a clock bell.

== Further information ==
Services are held in the Liebfrauenkirche on Sundays and religious holidays at 10:30 am. Founded 1945 by the cantor Harald Wolf, the boys' choir is recognized throughout the region.
