= Bank of Bremen =

Former German bank

Bremer Bank
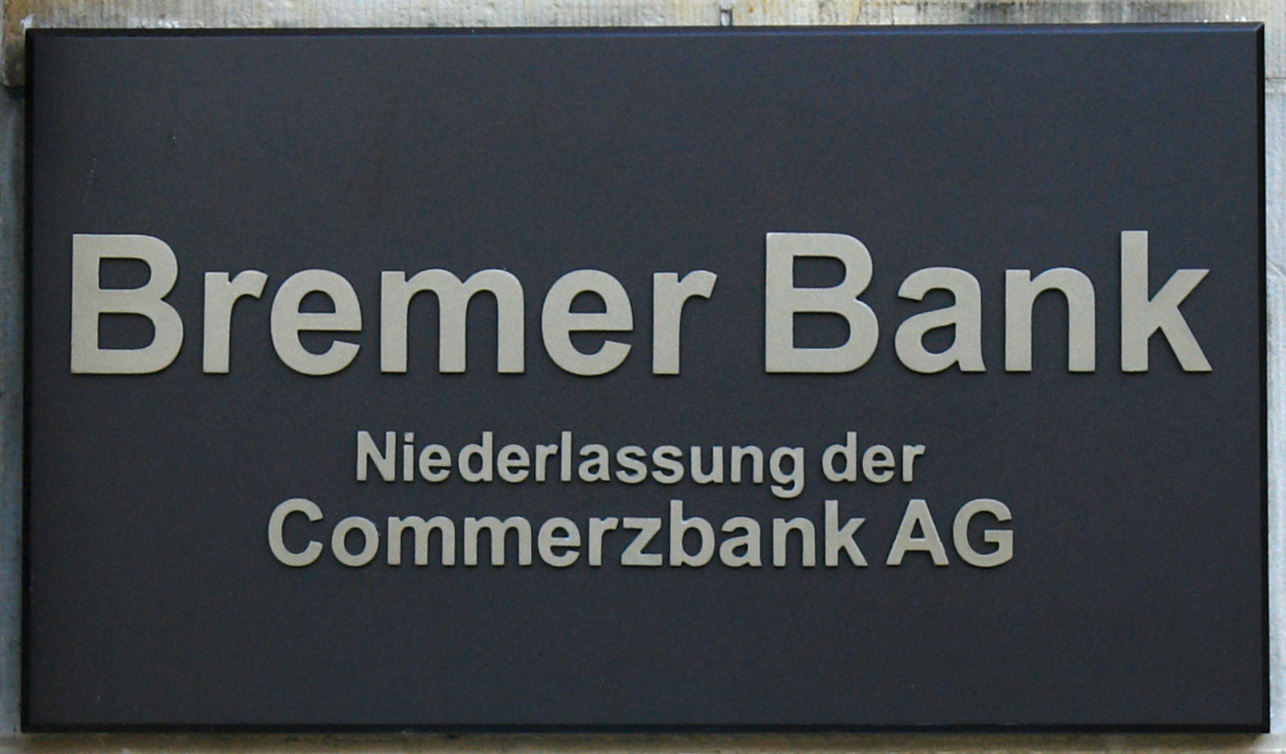

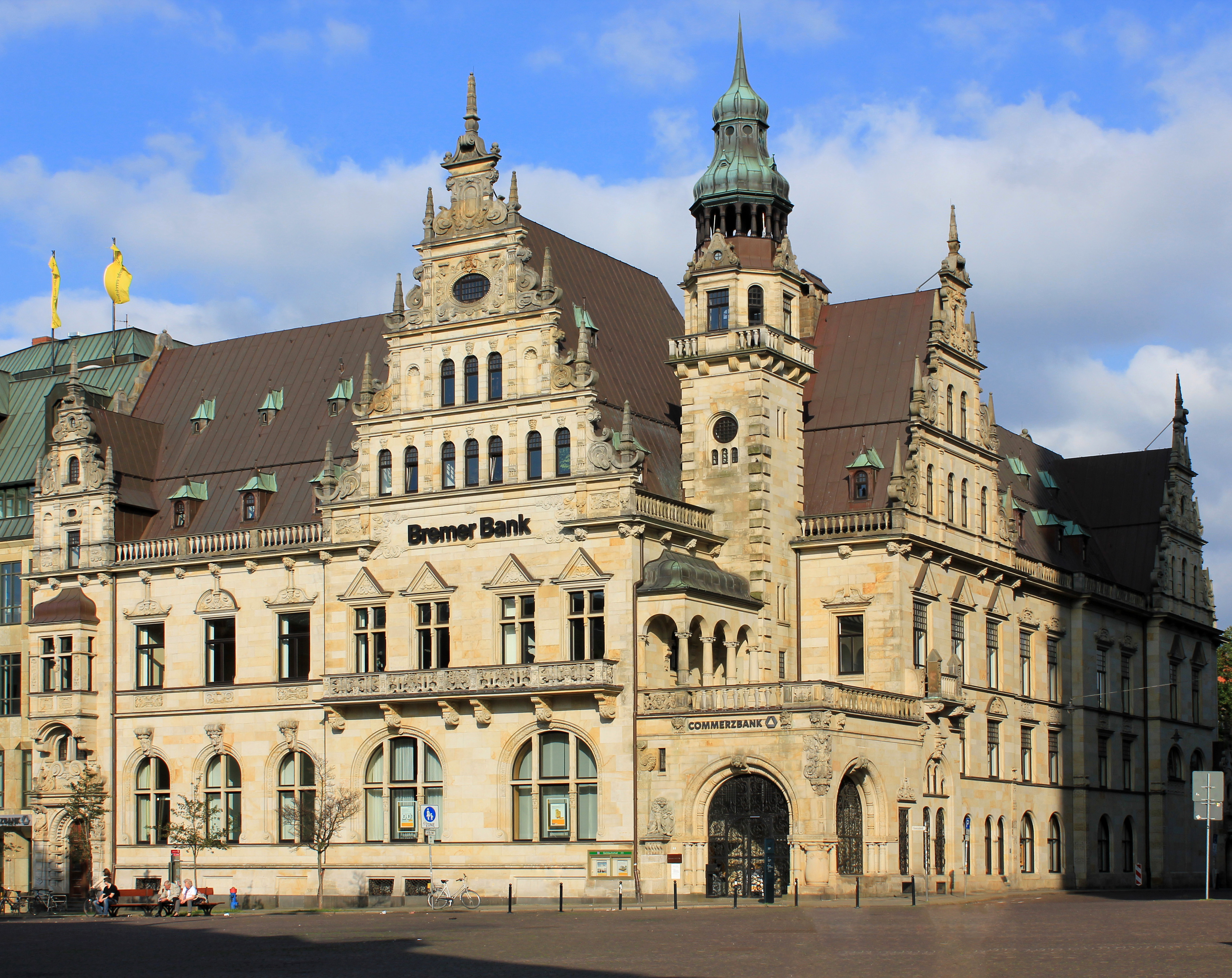
- The old bank building at the Domshof
- Founded: 1856
- Headquarters: Bremen
- Parent: Dresdner Bank

The Bank of Bremen (German: Bremer Bank) was a German bank, founded in 1856 initially as a bank of issue, a privilege which it lost in 1889. In 1895, it was acquired by Dresdner Bank but the brand name survived until 2010. It had branches in Bremen's districts Mitte (city center next to Bremen Cathedral), Neustadt, Utbremen, and Vegesack.

== History ==
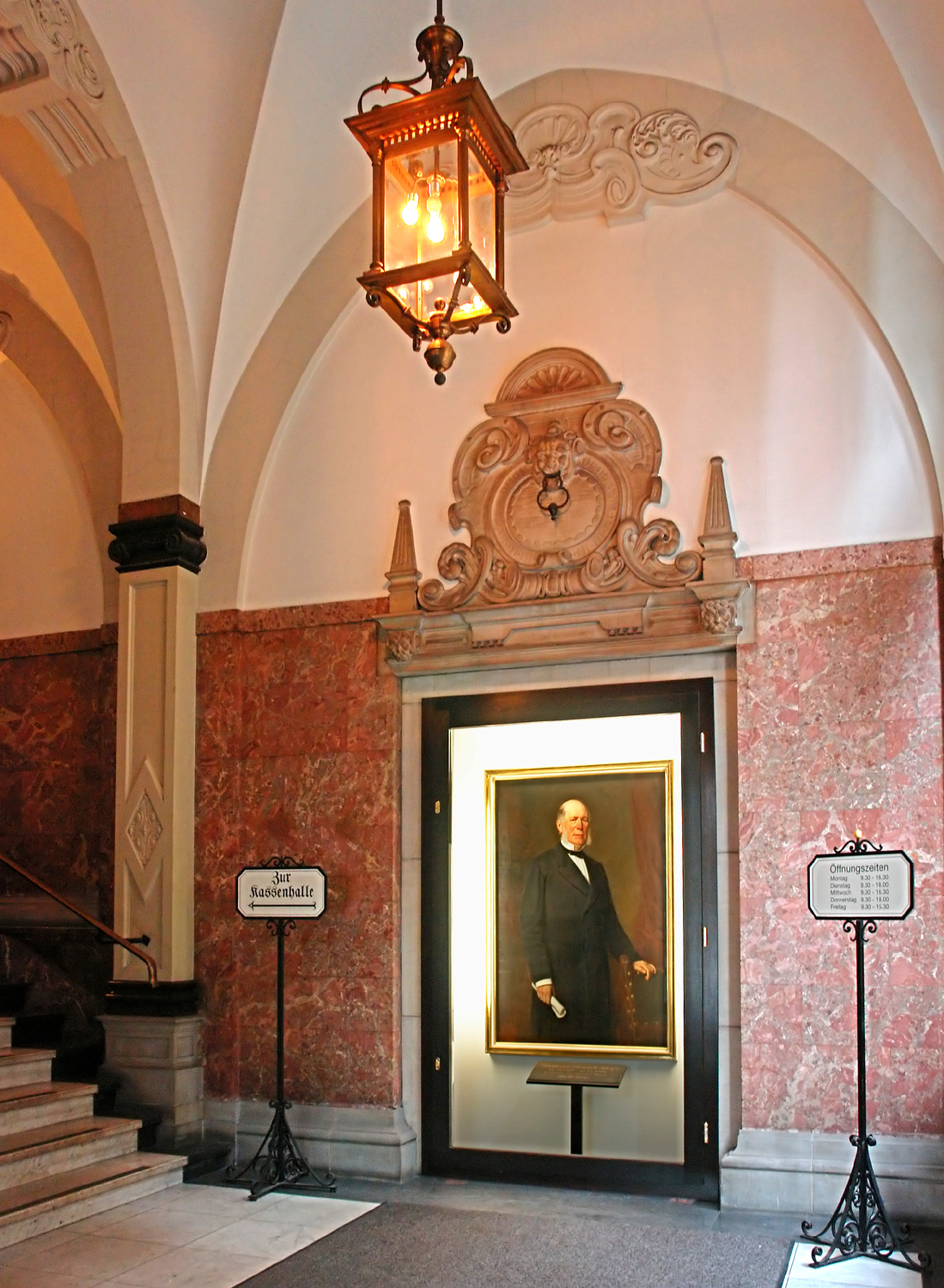
Portrait of founder Hermann Henrich Meier (1809–1898) in the bank building's lobby

The Bank of Bremen was founded in 1856 by tradesmen and ship-owners and with a significant contribution of Hermann Henrich Meier, also associated with the founding of the Bremen Exchange and Norddeutscher Lloyd. Its forerunner was the Bremer Discontokasse, founded in 1817. Together with the Frankfurter Bank (est. 1854), it was viewed as more independent than most other local banks of issue in Germany, which were generally under direct government control even when they were not government-owned.

In 1895, Hermann Henrich Meier led the merger negotiations with Eugen Gutmann of Dresdner Bank. The merger was profitable for the Bremer tradesmen; the name Bremer Bank remained used in Bremen. The branches in Bremerhaven were later relabeled as Dresdner Bank.

From 1902 until 1904 a new head office building was built according to plans by architects Albert Dunkel and Dietrich Tölken in the Neo-Renaissance style in Domshof (Cathedral Court), a location that had been occupied by the St. Petri orphanage until demolition in 1902. In 1979, the building was significantly expanded by a north-east extension on plans by architect Dietrich and Herrmann. A building located next to the old bank headquarters was included in the extension, of which only a white front in the style of neoclassicism remained. The old bank building was mostly preserved especially the entrance area towards Domshof. From 1980 until 1990 the building was also home of Bremen Exchange.

Following the 2010 acquisition of Dresdner Bank by Commerzbank, the Bremer Bank's former base of customers and staff was added to Commerzbank. Since 2010, the brand Bremer Bank has been entirely discontinued. A trademark protection has extended until November 30, 2019. The name Bremer Bank is now solely used for the landmarked building at Domshof, where Commerzbank maintained a branch until mid-2015.

The copper lettering 'Bremer Bank' remained on the gable of the building. Above the entrance used to be green luminous advertising reading 'Bremer Bank' which was replaced according to landmark requirements by a copper sign now reading 'Commerzbank' including the logo also in brown copper. The color of the copper writings through weathering in time will turn into a green basic copper(II)-carbonate color which will match the building's roof.

The old bank building on the corner Domshof / Sandstraße has been listed as landmark since 1994. The entrances in other parts of the building ensemble are designed as official access to offices and other institutions. For example, the Bremer branch of Barmer GEK is located behind the white, classical front. In 2016 a branch of manufactum was opened in the counter hall. Today, "Markthalle Acht" (Market hall 8) is located in the atrium of the building ensemble which was roofed, because of the address Domshof 8.

== See also ==
- Frankfurter Bank
- Bank of Prussia
- List of banks in Germany
