= St. John's Church, Bremen =

Catholic church in Bremen, Germany

Coordinates: 53°04′25″N 8°48′30″E

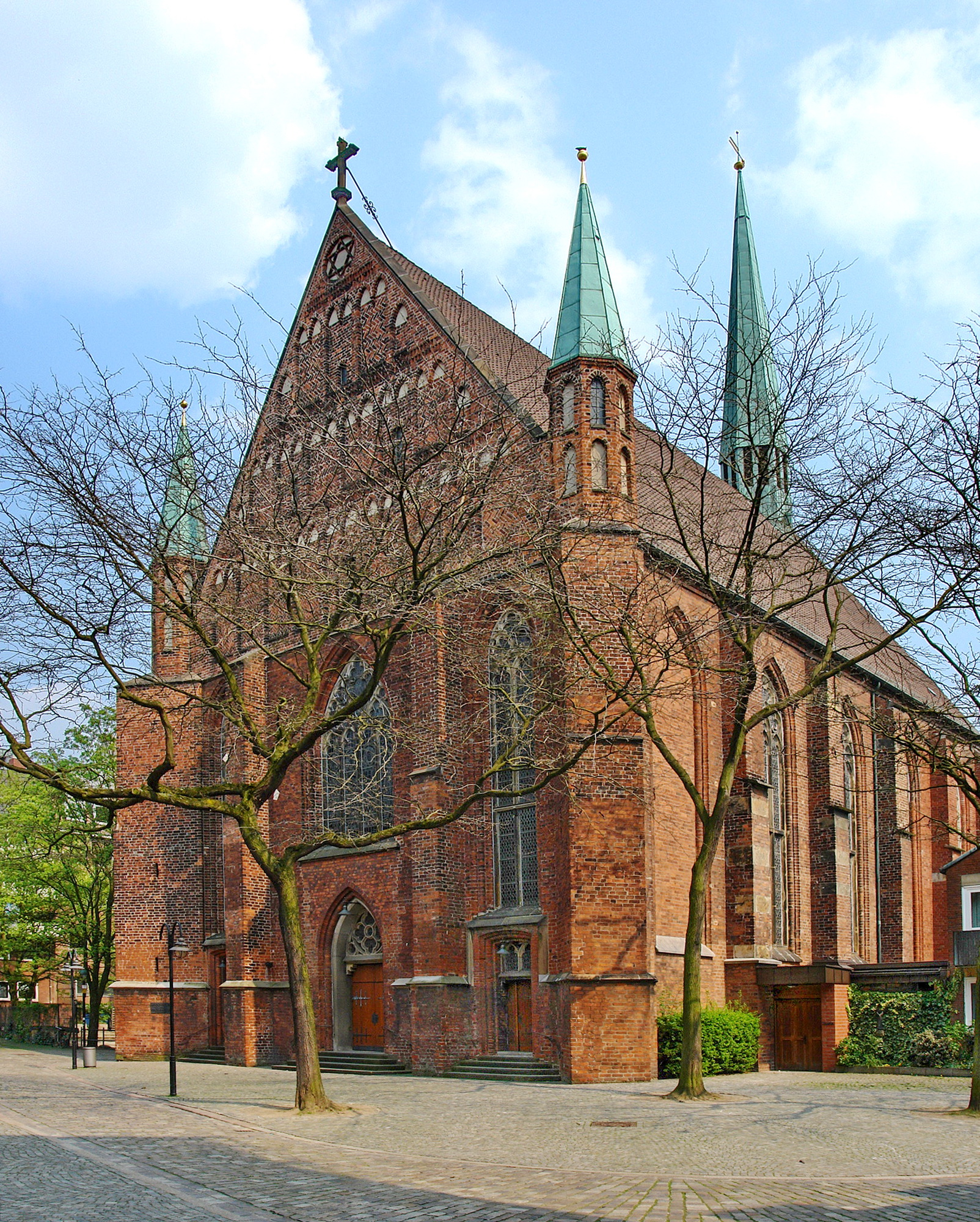
Provost church of St John

St John's Church (German: St. Johann) is a Roman Catholic provost church in Bremen. It was built in the fourteenth century as a Franciscan abbey church and has been a listed monument since 1973.

== History and architecture ==
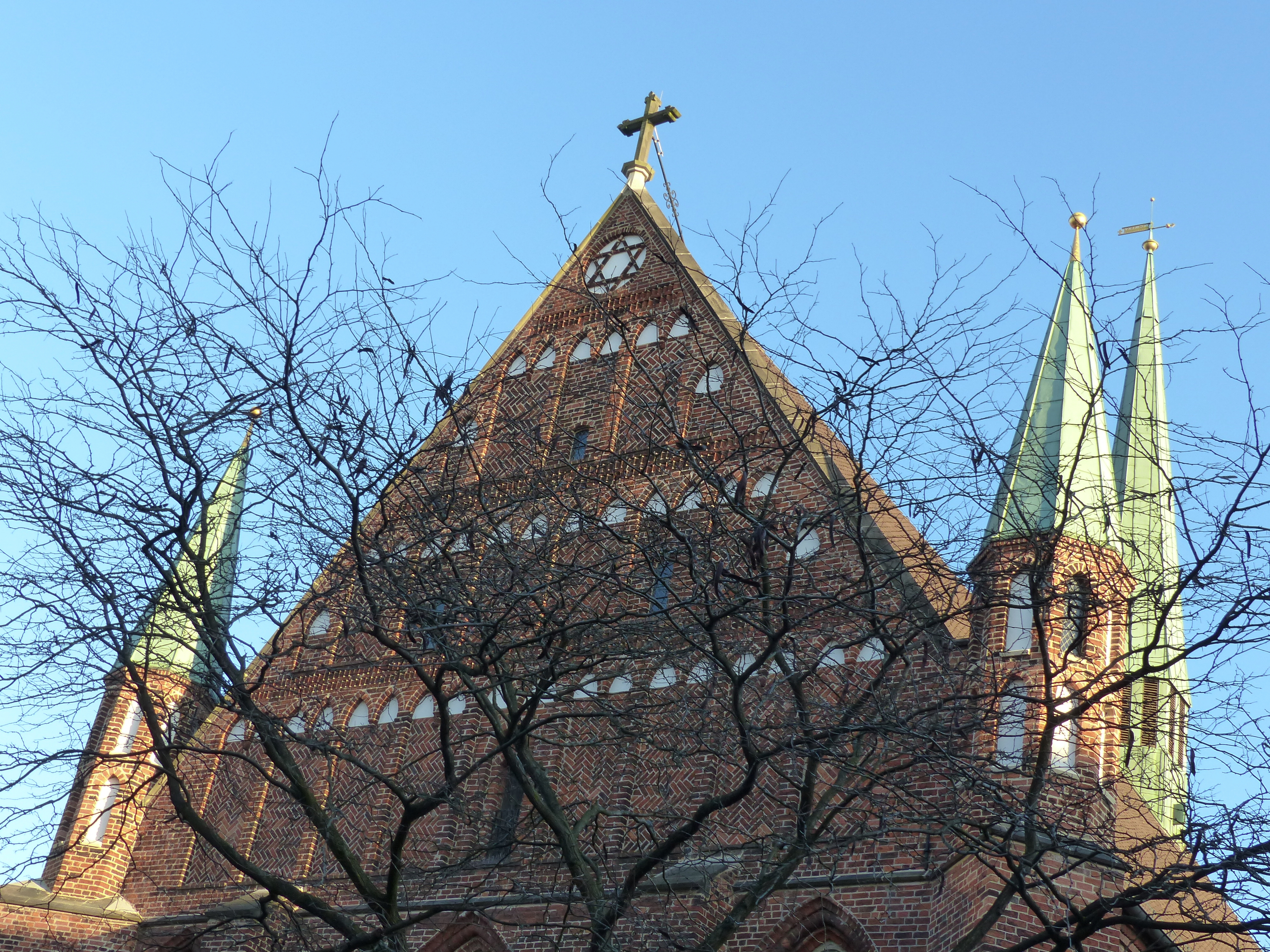
Decorated gable

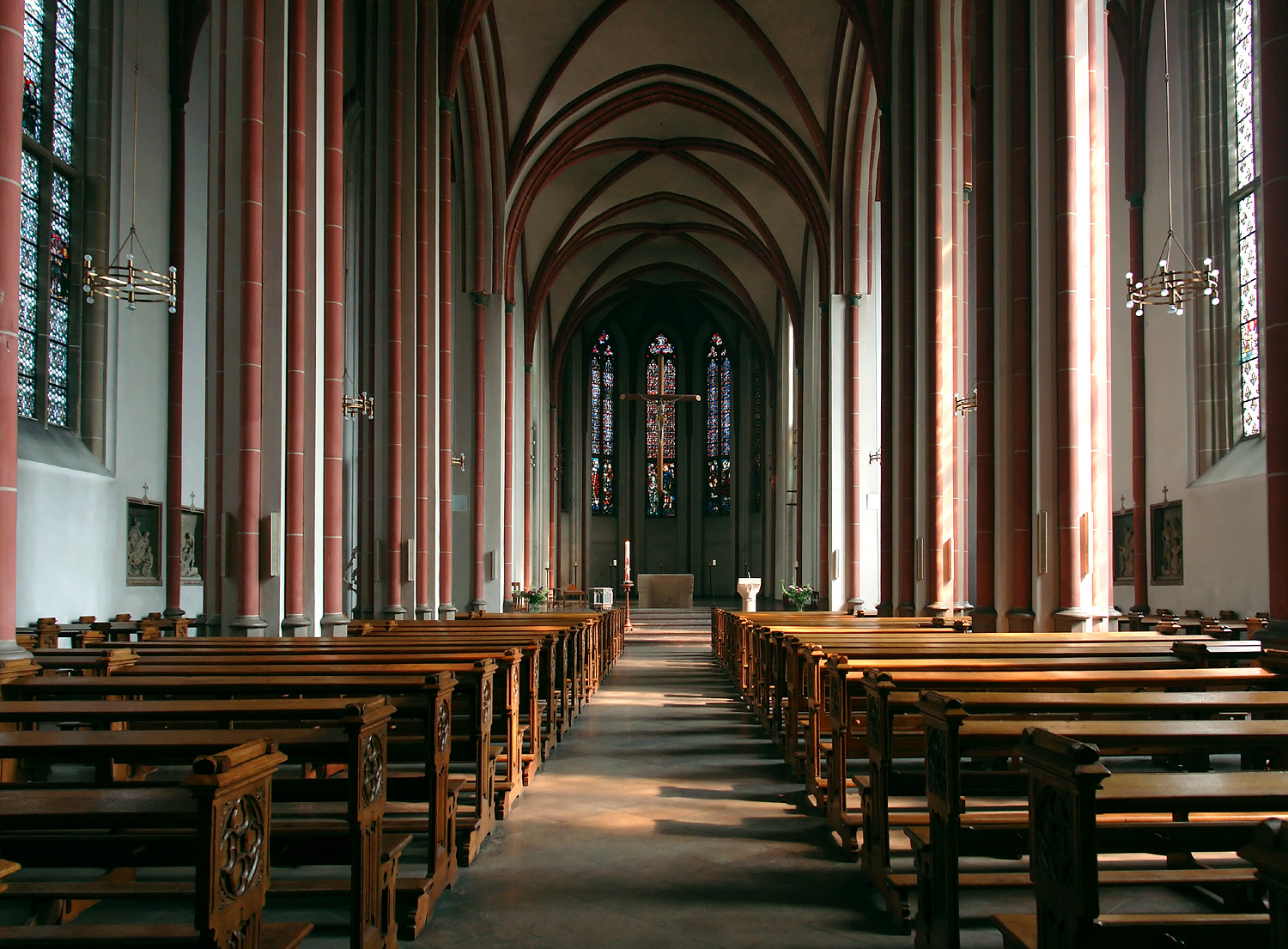
View of the choir

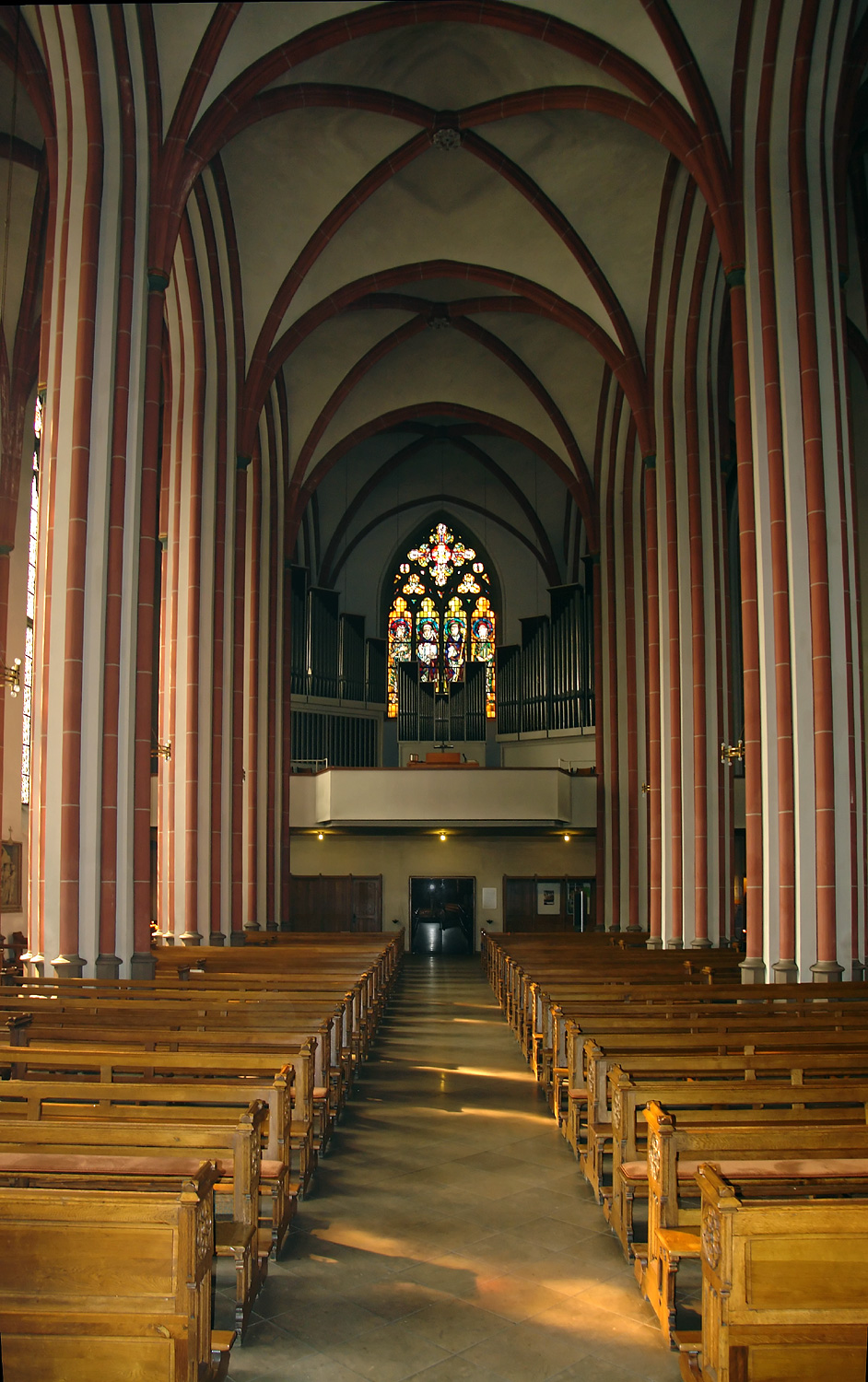
View of the organ

On the site of the modern church in the eastern part of the old city, in Schnoor, the Franciscans erected a monastery with a basilica in 1225. The monastery grew rapidly and the church was soon too small. As a result, a vaulted Hall church with three aisles was built in its place in 1380. The money for this came mostly from the many funerary endowments resulting from the Black Death in Europe, which killed seven thousand in Bremen.

In 1528, during the Reformation, the monastery was closed and Bremen's first hospital and mental asylum was built on the site of the monastery in 1538, with the approval of the monks. Church and monastery served different purposes; the church was used as a hospital church and sometimes served Protestant congregations when their churches were being renovated or repaired. From 1684 religious services of the Huguenots and later of Belgian religious refugees were held in the church. Until the middle of the seventeenth century, the monastery continued to serve as Bremen's hospital. At that point it became a retirement home, in which the possessors of prebends lived – citizens who had secured a permanent right of residence for themselves in exchange for a payment of a sum.

From 1802 only the choir was used in religious services. The nave was meant to be converted into a warehouse, but, due to the Napoleonic invasion of Bremen, this never occurred. The catholic community which was officially recognised again in 1806 acquired the church at the impetus of the council and rededicated it as a Catholic church on 17 October 1823, after restoration work. Using the rubble from the destruction of the monastery for hygiene reasons in 1834, the level of the streets around the church was raised by two meters to avoid floods; within the church, the floor level was raised by three metres. As a result, a large cellar was created, which was rented commercially in order to offset debt until 1992 when it became the crypt. Raising the floor level of the church meant that the ceiling height is three metres lower than it used to be. The reconstruction of 1822/3 can be most easily be discerned from the lower part of the choir windows which have been bricked up.

St John is the only surviving monastery church in the city. Only Catherine's Passage (Katharinenpassage) in the city centre testifies to the existence of the earlier Dominican monastery and its church of St Katherine. St Paul's monastery in front of the city gates was destroyed in 1546 by military action.

The church building is a particularly clear example of the Brick gothic style. All three naves were covered by a single especially large pitched roof. The west gable's extraordinary form and size derives from this design. It is divided into three stories, which each contain pointed arch windows arranged in pairs. The base line of these windows is a line of ornamental brickwork. At the apex of the gable is a cruciform window with a star of David. This has been in place since 1878, when the roof was repaired and the new gable installed, surmounted by a stone cross. The star of David was probably included as a result of horror vacui. No other symbolic significance at all is attested in church documents. One can, however, suggest that the star of David is symbolic of the Old Testament and the cruciform shape is symbolic of the New Testament. The two belong together and form the foundation of the church.

The building did not include a tower originally, in line with the rules of the Franciscan order, though it did have a Flèche.

=== St John's Abbey ===
The former St John's Abbey of the Franciscan order, which stood next to the church, no longer survives. It existed from 1258 to 1528.

=== Provost of St John ===
In 1965 a series of two-story red stone houses, designed by Bernhard Wessel for the Provost of St John (Propstei St. Johannis), were built at Hohe Straße 2-7/Franziskanerstraße 7 on the monastery grounds. Since 1973 the buildings are among Bremen's listed heritage sites.

== Community ==
The parish of St John and the parish of St Elisabeth in Hastedt (Bremen) were combined as the provostship of St John on 1 January 2007. 10,500 Catholics from more than a hundred nations belong to the new congregation.

The provostship has its office at Hohe Straße 2-7. St John's kindergarten (Kolpingstraße 2), St John's elementary school (Tiefer 12), St John's secondary school I and II (Dechanatstraße 9) and Birgittenkloster (Convent of Saint Birgitta) are a few of the many provostship buildings in the municipal area.

Dr Hermann Lange was chaplain and pastor of the church from 1911 to 1931.

== Organ ==
The organ of St John's was built in 1965 by the organ firm Franz Breil (Dorsten). The instrument has 47 registers in three manuals. The playing system is mechanical, but the register system is electronic.

== See also ==
- Roman Catholic Diocese of Osnabrück

== General references ==
- Wilhelm Tacke. St. Johann in Bremen. Bremen: Edition Temmen 2006. ISBN 3-86108-583-6
- Hans-Christoph Hoffmann. Bremen, pp. 136–138, Köln: DuMont, 4. Auflage 1991. ISBN 3-7701-1754-9
