= Spitzen Gebel =

Historic building in the centre of Bremen, Germany

Coordinates: 53°4′30″N 8°48′24″E

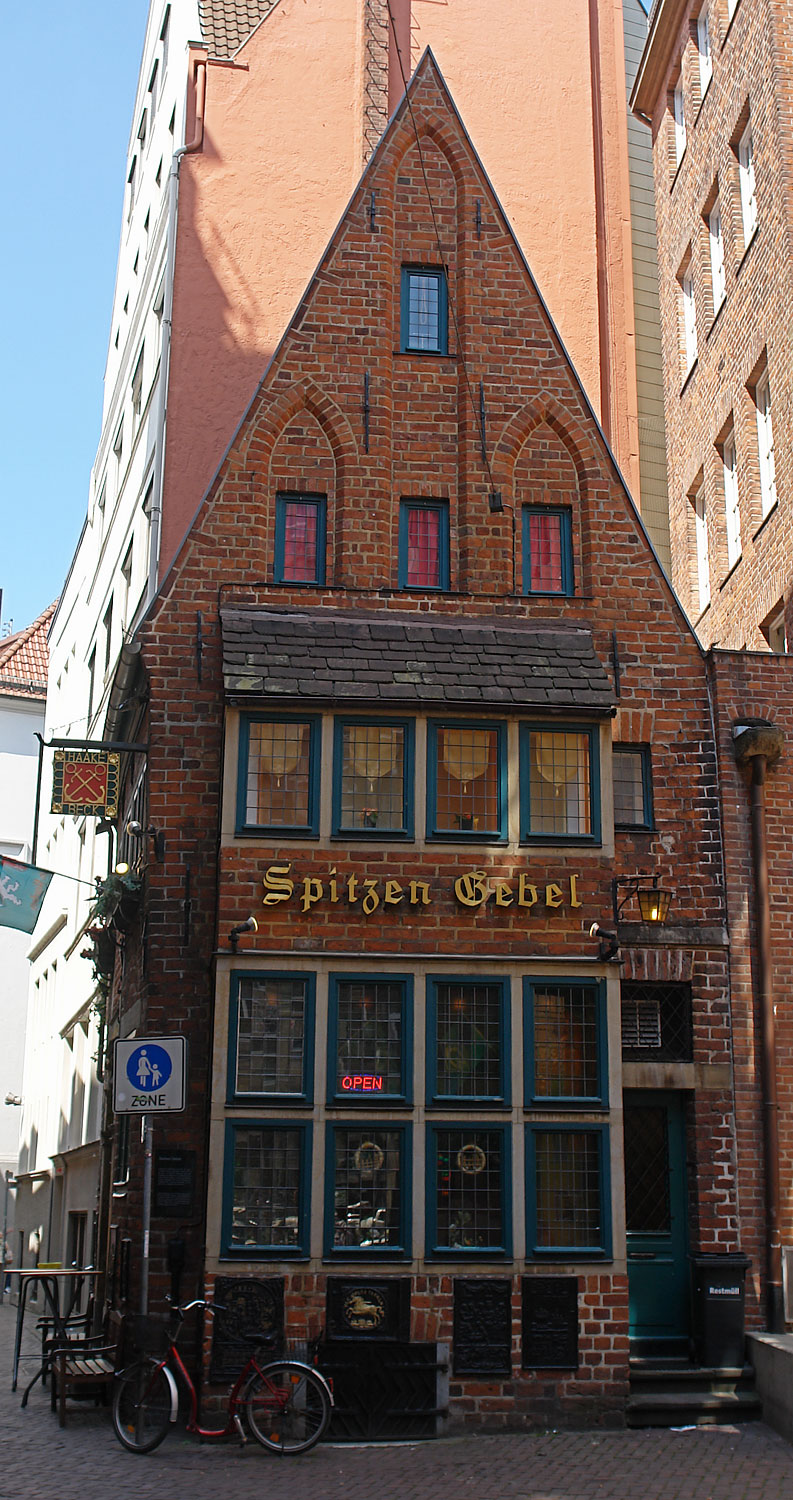
Spitzen Gebel, Bremen

Spitzen Gebel (literally: "pointed gable") is a historic building in the centre of Bremen, Germany, located at No. 1, Hinter dem Schütting. Its origins date to the year 1400, but it was rebuilt in the Gothic style in 1590 with additions in 1610. Since 1973, it has been a listed building.

== History ==
Dating from the time around 1400, the Spitzen Gebel is the oldest town house and the last of its kind in Bremen. The building has served as both a shop and a private residence over the centuries. Its Low German name stems from the pointed gable crowning its facade. It was a wine house, a butcher's shop and a tavern until in 1913 it became an office for the Vereinigten Klavierträger (united piano movers). As a result, the older residents of Bremen still remember it as the Klavierträgerhaus (piano movers' house).

The building has been altered on several occasions. The projecting bay windows, a popular feature in Bremen, and the east doorway were added in 1590. The main doorway was completed in 1610. In 1944, the building suffered serious war damage. A watercolour from 1945 shows a ruined brick building although the characteristic gable can still be seen. By 1950, the house had been fully restored under the guidance of architects Herbert Anker (1908–1987) and Bernhard Wessel (1904–1976). A restaurant soon opened inside.

== Heritage ==
The building is considered important for the city's heritage and it is listed. A bronze sculpture Fietje Balge by the sculptor Bernd Altenstein was erected in the street outside in 2007. A nearby plaque explains the history of the River Balge which once passed nearby.

== Strange tradition ==
Today's tavern practices a tradition that goes back to 1913 when the piano movers used the premises. As they were not permitted to drink at work, they filled an old lamp with schnapps and took a slurp from time to time without anyone noticing. Today tourists in particular enjoy taking a Sluk ut de Lamp (swig from the lamp) when they visit the bar. The schnapps is made from a centuries-old Swedish recipe which is still a family secret.
