= Schlachte Great Crane =

Coordinates: 53°04′32.58″N 8°48′10.09″E

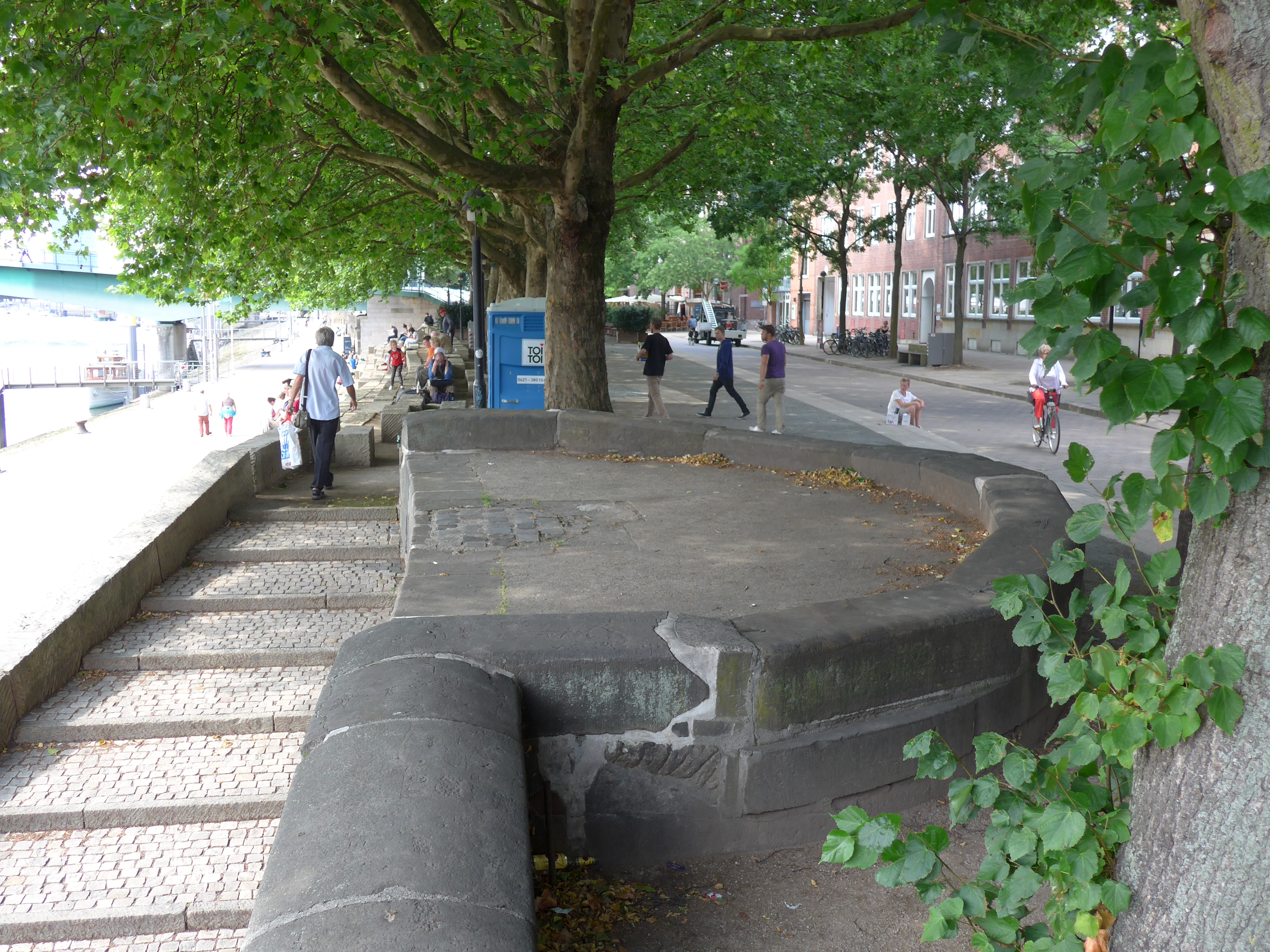
Foundations of the great crane

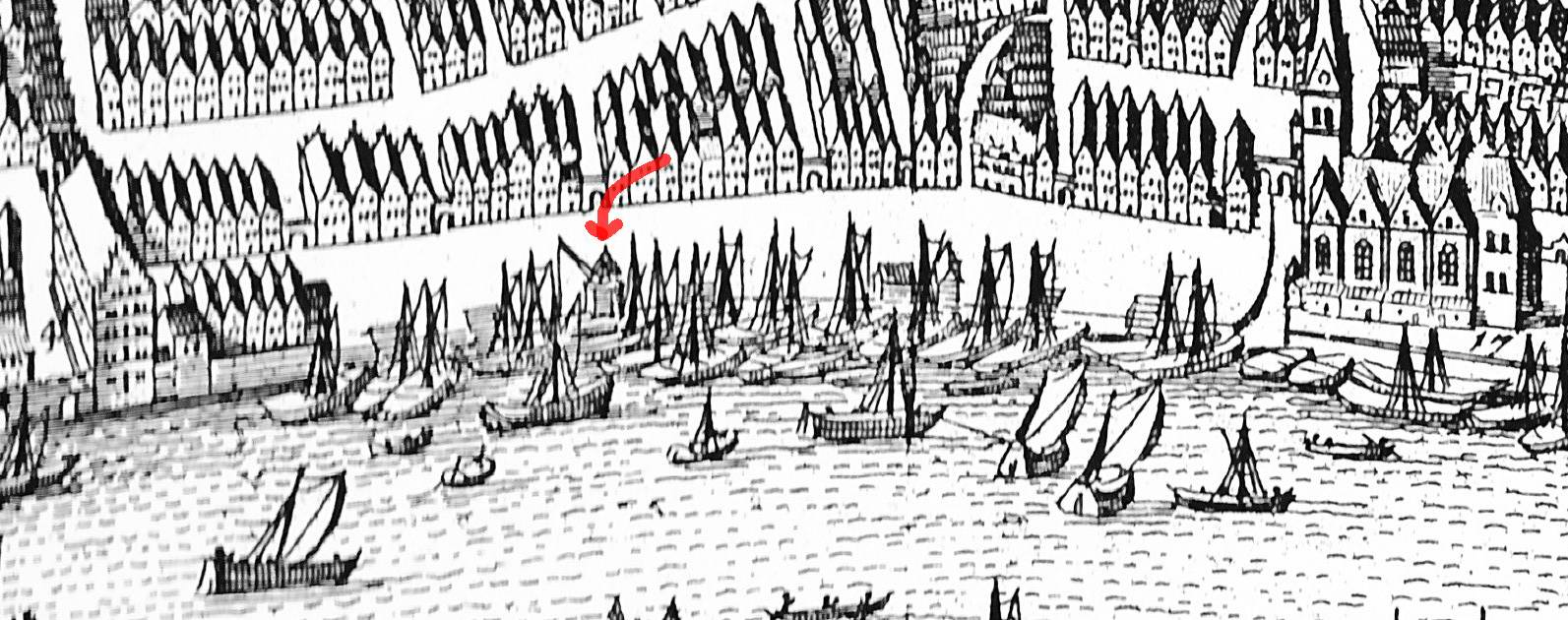
The Bremen crane shown in 1640

The Schlachte Cranes were important to the port of Bremen as they enabled heavy loads to be moved off boats on the River Weser. The Schlachte became an important harbour for the city after silting prevented the use of the Balge as a harbour. Today, only the foundations of a 19th-century crane remain on the Weser waterfront.

== History ==
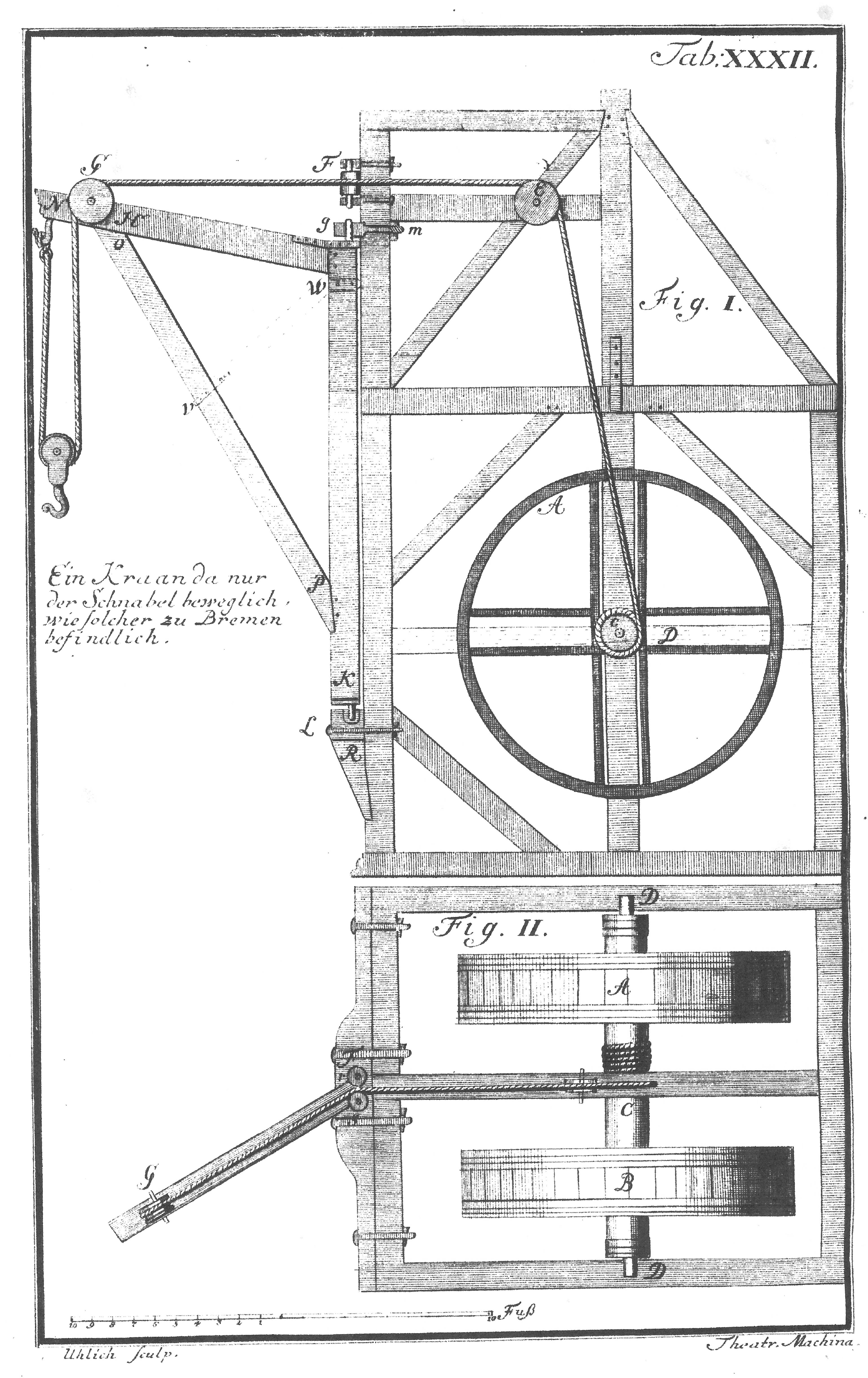
1725 diagram of the crane by Leupold

A map of Bremen made around 1640 clearly shows what must be a large crane. The wooden structure was built around a central mast that allowed the crane to turn.

A new harbour crane installed in 1684 is attributed to Jacob Leupold. This crane could also rotate but two large treadwheels enabled six men to lift a load of three tonnes. In his book on the theory of machines, Leupold illustrates two cranes at Bremen. The more ambitious model is pictured here. The boom would have been much longer as it has been shortened to fit within the illustration. The crane would have been used for moving exceptionally heavy loads of single items as the predominant method of moving loads was to use human labour.

The Schlachte became an important harbour for the city after silting prevented the use of the Balge as a harbour. Today the stone foundations of a large crane are preserved on the Schlachte promenade along the River Weser. A plaque explains the history of the cranes.

== Literature ==
- Weidinger, Ulrich (1997). Mit Koggen zum Marktplatz: Bremens Hafenstrukturen vom frühen Mittelalter bis zum Beginn der Industrialisierung. Hauschild. ISBN 978-3-931785-09-3.
