= Schlachte (Bremen) =

Promenade along the east bank of the River Weser in Germany

Coordinates: 53°4′34″N 8°48′08″E

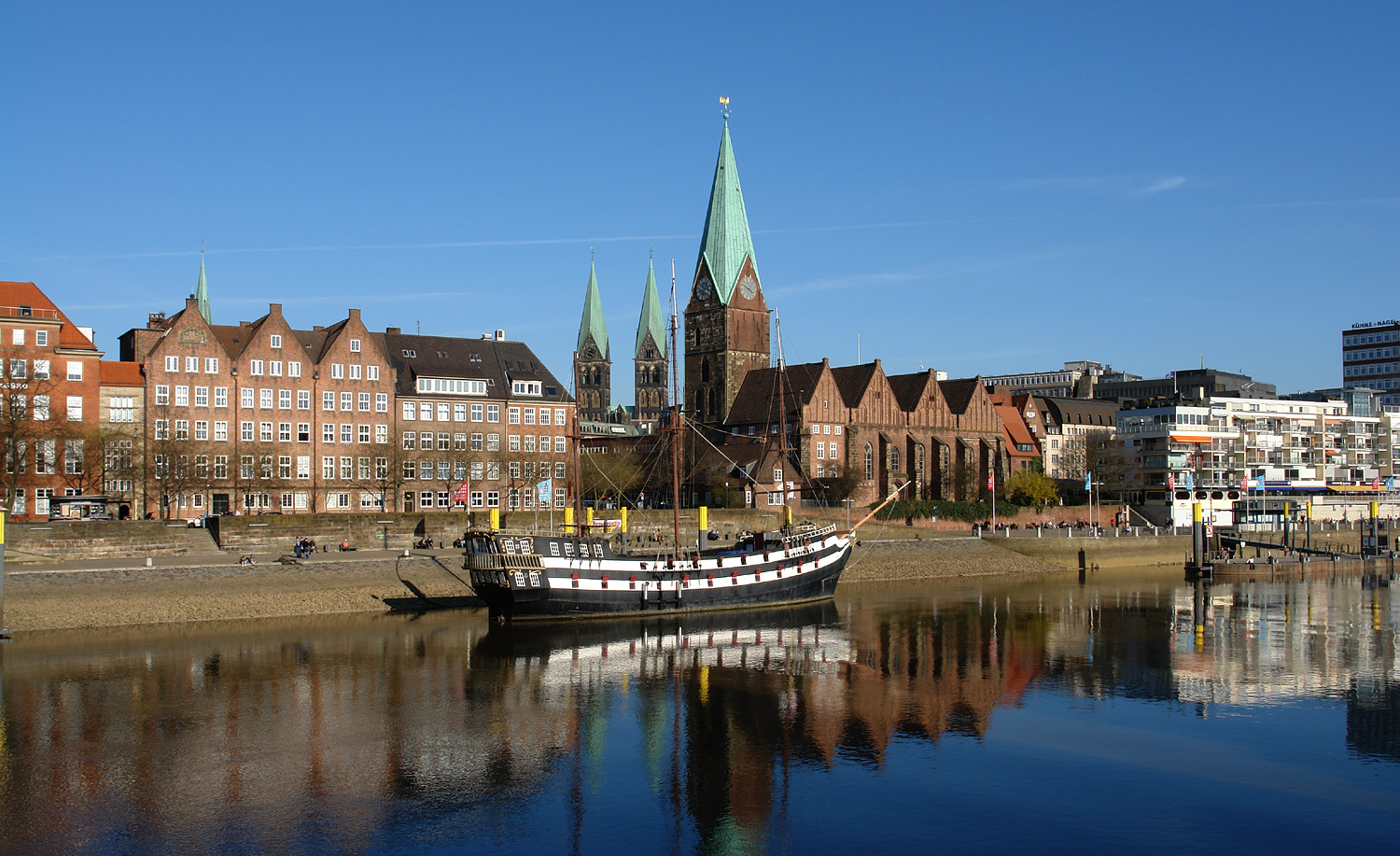
Schlachte Embankment, Bremen

The Schlachte is a promenade along the east bank of the River Weser in the old town of Bremen in the north of Germany. Once one of the city's harbours, it is now popular for its restaurants, beer gardens and river boats.

== Etymology ==
Schlachte is a Low German word for a river bank reinforced with wooden piles driven in by the action of hammering (cf. German eingeschlagenen). The word slait was used as early as 1250 to refer to the river bank in Bremen.

== History ==
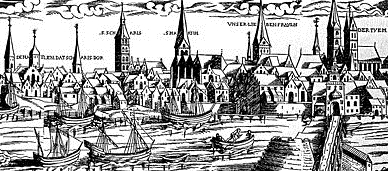
Woodcut by Hans Weigel (c. 1550)

In 1247, following authorisation from Archbishop Gerhard II, the area between St Martini's Church and Zweite Schlachtpforte (a street meaning "second quayside gate") was settled by local citizens and traders. In 1250, those privileged to operate water mills were required to maintain the wooden piles used to reinforce the river bank. In the 13th century, both the Schlachte and the Balge were used as harbours for wood (used as firewood) and limestone although the banks of the Balge soon became Bremen's main port. Both harbours were used until the 16th century, the Balge for sea-going ships and the Schlachte for flat-bottomed vessels and river barges. As a result of the silting of the Weser in the early 17th century, the Schlachte became Bremen's main harbour until the beginning of the 19th century.

The appearance of the Schlachte on the woodcut (pictured) from c. 1550 clearly shows a quayside with timber reinforcement although a little later a stone structure was substituted. In 1557, the Schlachte officially became part of the city of Bremen. From 1600 to 1830, there was little change in the appearance of the Schlachte and the rare changes harbour equipment were to the great cranes. It stretched 450 m (1,480 ft) from St Martini Church to the Kornhaus. On the town side, it was bordered by a row of half-timbered houses.

An increase in freight in the first half of the 19th century brought about a modest extension to the Schlachte but the arrival of the railway in 1860 brought major changes to Bremen's harbours, especially after Bremerhaven was connected to the rail network in 1862. Thereafter, the Schlachte played no further part as a harbour for the city.

== 20th-century development ==
As the offices and storerooms in the buildings along the Schachte had not been used for decades, at the end of the 20th century it was decided to undertake a comprehensive transformation of the area, given its attractive location on the riverside. Following the introduction of a pedestrian zone in 1985, between 1993 and 2000 many of the buildings were rebuilt under the "Stadt am Fluss" (Town on the River) chapter of Expo 2000.

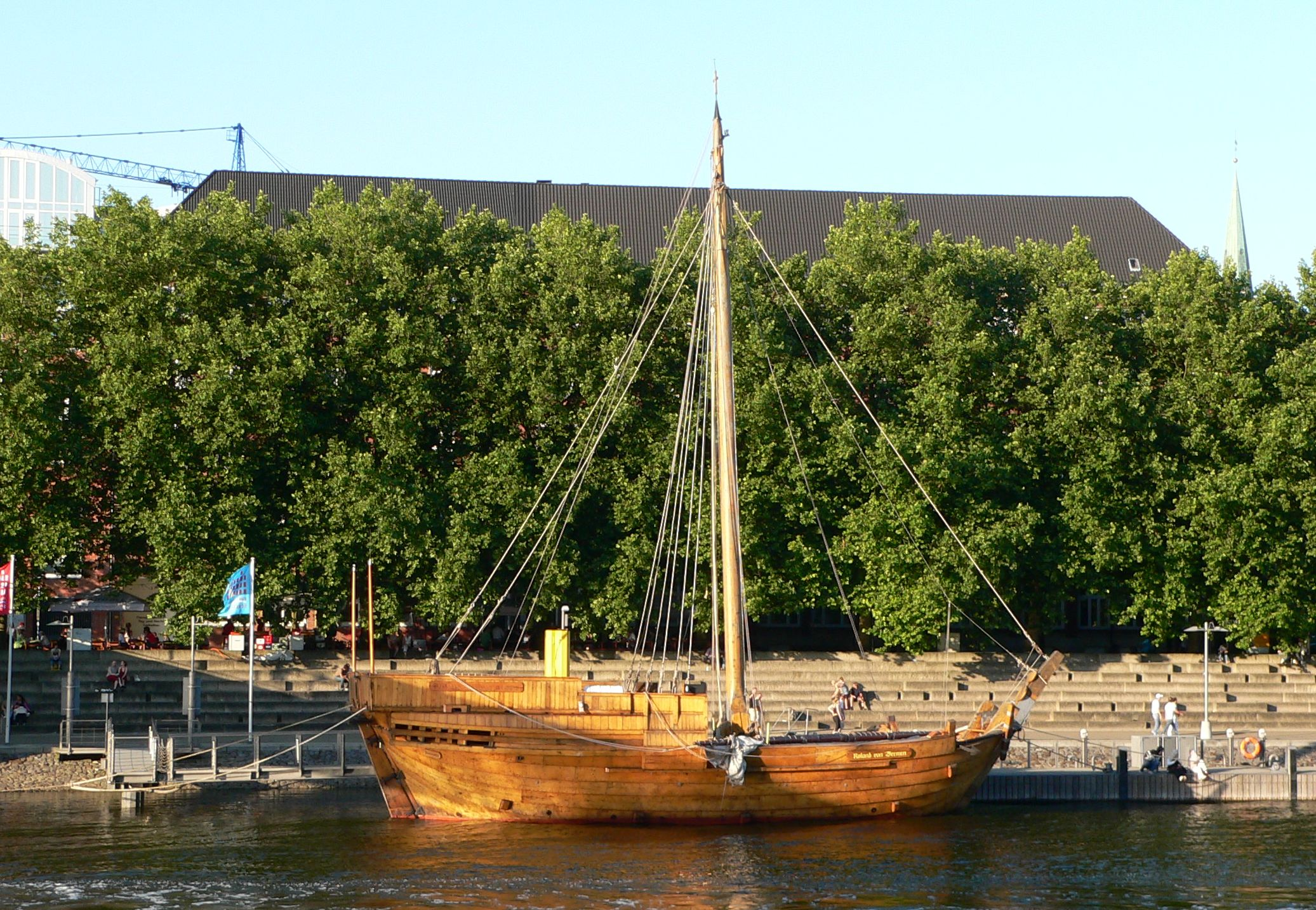
The cog Roland von Bremen

The lower level of the Schlachte was extended upstream and downstream as a modern promenade connected to paths leading into the old town. As a result, it became possible to walk some two kilometres along the riverside. Thereafter, the upstream section from Erste Schlachtpforte (first quayside gate) to the Bürgermeister Smidt Bridge was transformed into a promenade with a historic flair. The ground floors of former warehouses were converted into restaurants, bars and pubs with extensive open-air seating. Modern berths with moorings for several ships were introduced, accommodating the Friedrich and the Roland von Bremen, copied from the remains of a 14th-century cog discovered in 1962.

In 1996, a pedestrian footbridge was built connecting the Schlachte to the Teerhof peninsula in the middle of the River Weser. The promenade was further extended downstream from the Bürgermeister Smidt Bridge to the Diepenau corner in 2008.

== The Schlachte today ==
A number of ships moored along the Schlachte offer river tours up and down the River Weser. There are also landing stages available for those visiting the city in their pleasure craft. The restaurants on the promenade or on board some of the ships on the quayside offer both local dishes and specialities from more exotic regions. Accommodation is available at the youth hostel and on hotel ships. There are also a number of special events in the summer months including a regatta, flea markets and a barbecue festival.

== Literature ==
- Hill, Thomas (2004). Die Stadt und ihr Markt: Bremens Umlands- und Aussenbeziehungen im Mittelalter (12.-15. Jahrhundert). Franz Steiner Verlag. ISBN 978-3-515-08068-2.
- Johanek, Peter (2008). Die Stadt und ihr Rand. Böhlau Verlag Köln Weimar. pp. 177–. ISBN 978-3-412-24105-6.
