= Shipper's House in Bremen =

Historic building in Bremen, Germany

Coordinates: 53°04′23″N 8°48′31″E

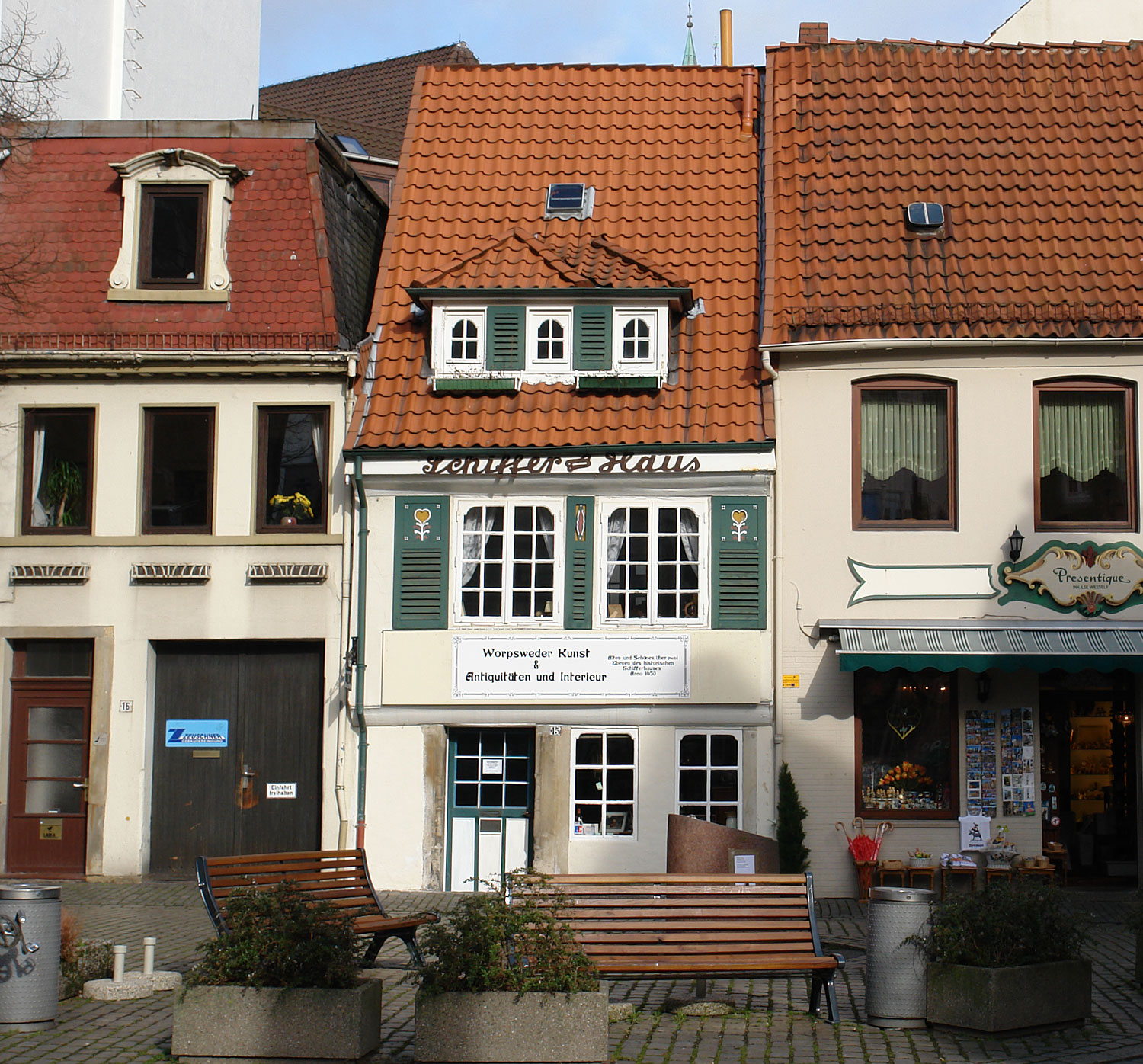

The Shipper's House in Bremen, Germany is a building in the oldest district of the Free Hanseatic city of Bremen. The house was registered as an historical monument in 1973 and is in Schnoor. During the last 25 years of the 20th century the house was a private museum. It was an attraction for many visitors including the former German Foreign Minister Hans-Dietrich Genscher.

== Building history ==
This house was built in 1630 on the southern bank of the Klosterbalge, a medieval tributary of the river Weser. The house was extended in 1750 and around the year 1920.

The original truss is largely preserved. It is likely that some beams are about 400 years old. In contrast to some other buildings in the Schnoor, the interstices of the truss are filled with stones. The type of construction can be traced back to the economic position of homeowners: Half-timbered houses with clay and straw roof formed the majority for the homes over centuries. Only rich people who could afford used stones and roof shingles.

== History of uses ==
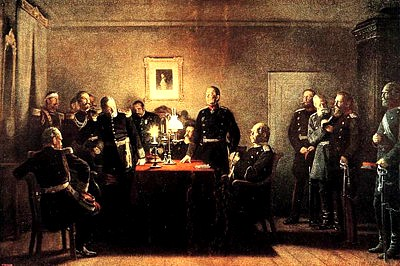
The reproduction of a painting in memory of the Battle of Sedan (1870) was to be seen in the former living room of Theodor Dahle

During the 19th century the house was an inn with a restaurant on the ground floor and accommodations on the upper floors.

From 1919 until the middle of the 20th century there was a business for boat supplies, groceries and food products. After his retirement the owner Theodor Dahle turned the ground floor into a private museum showing an old inn. The museum was expanded around 1975 to the upper floors.

In December 2006 the association WeserStrom decided to open office and place of business in this house in order to establish a cooperative to finance a new water power plant in Bremen. The building of this plant was finished in 2011, but without capital from the cooperative.

From September 2007 to January 2009 a shop in the lower two floors offered art and antiques from Bremen and Worpswede. In order to continue business as an Antiquarian bookseller and antique store during the renovation work, an Internet shop on eBay was created which recorded over a period of five years around 100,000 visitors.

At the end of August 2011 a group of artists who previously showed their pictures in the gallery "Artemis", Schnoor 15, opened a shop in the ground floor. In July 2012 the gallery changed its name to "Künstlerhaus im Schnoor" (House of Artists in the Schnoor). This gallery closed at the end of December 2012.

In January 2013 the house was sold at public auction for about 200,000 Euro.

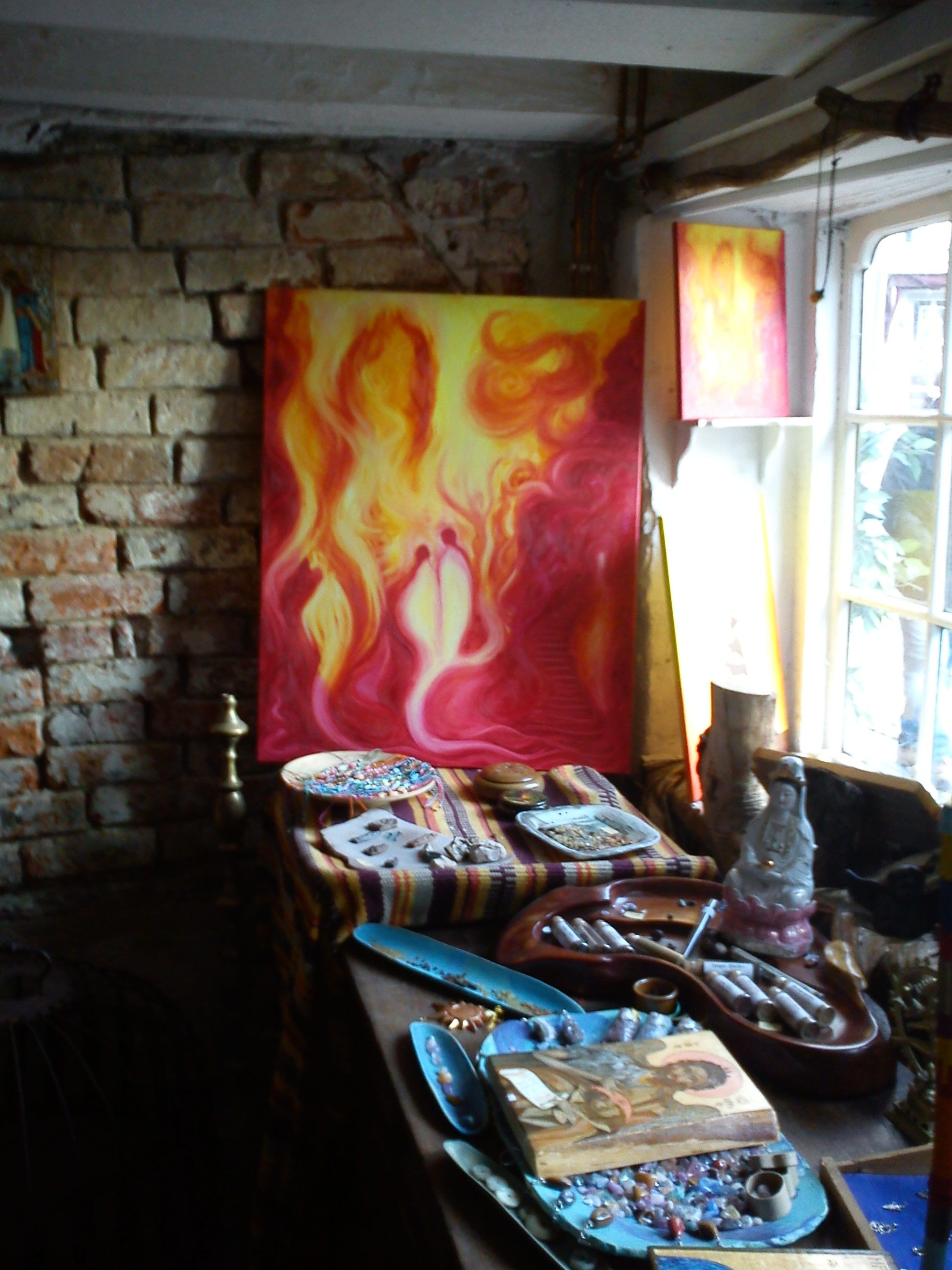
Interior of the Shipper's house, ground floor, collection 2012

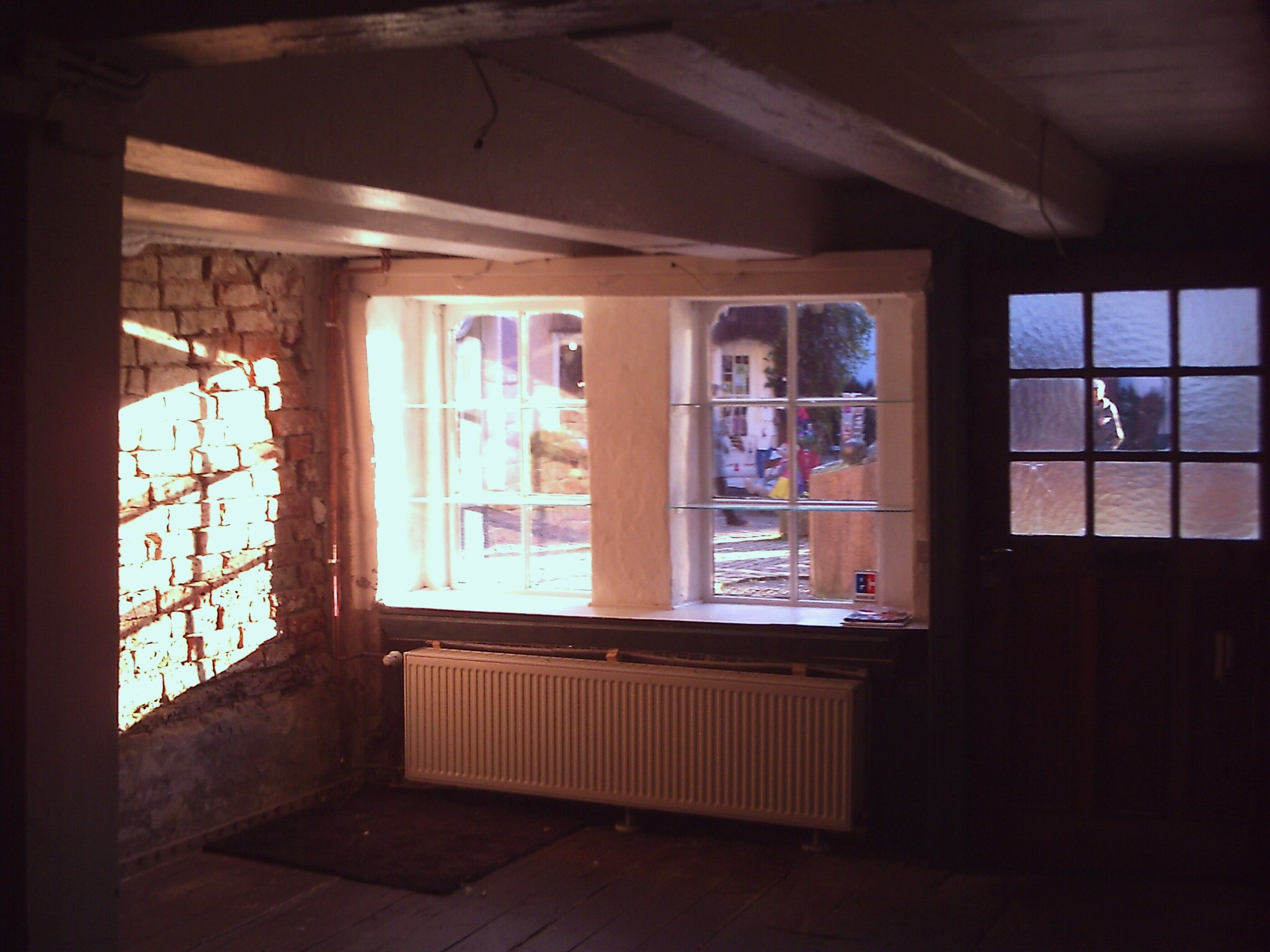
View from inside the house, 2013

== Residents and owners of the house ==
In 1878 the innkeeper Heinrich Lohmann bought the house at a price of 7,950 marks.

From 1906 to 1919 the house was owned by a community legacy, which consisted of the following three people there:

1. Marie Anna Lohmann, widow of Heinrich Lohmann
2. Sophie Lohmann, sister of Heinrich Lohmann
3. Luise Höcker, sister of Anna Marie Lohmann

From 1919 until 1968 Theodor Dahle was the owner and lived with his wife Johanne Dahle in the upper rooms. In December 2005 the environmental scientist Frank M. Rauch bought the house and developed a virtual museum.

== Private museum ==
The owner Theodor Dahle turned the ground floor into a reproduction of a historic restaurant. This device was shown around 1975 as a private museum and stayed until the end of 2005 largely preserved. The upper rooms were shown as they were unchanged since the death of Dahle's wife. In connection with an internet shop the new owner developed a virtual museum to show the history of the house. Public visitation take place here on European Heritage Days and other events.

== Literature ==
- Dieter Brand-Kruth: The Schnoor - A Charming District. Bremer Drucksachen Service Klaus Stute, 2000.
- Der Schnoor in Bremen. A portrait. Texts in German, English, French and Spanish. Edition Temmen, Bremen, 2004.
