= Marterburg =

Street in the Schnoor district of Bremen, Germany

Coordinates: 53°4′22″N 8°48′40″E

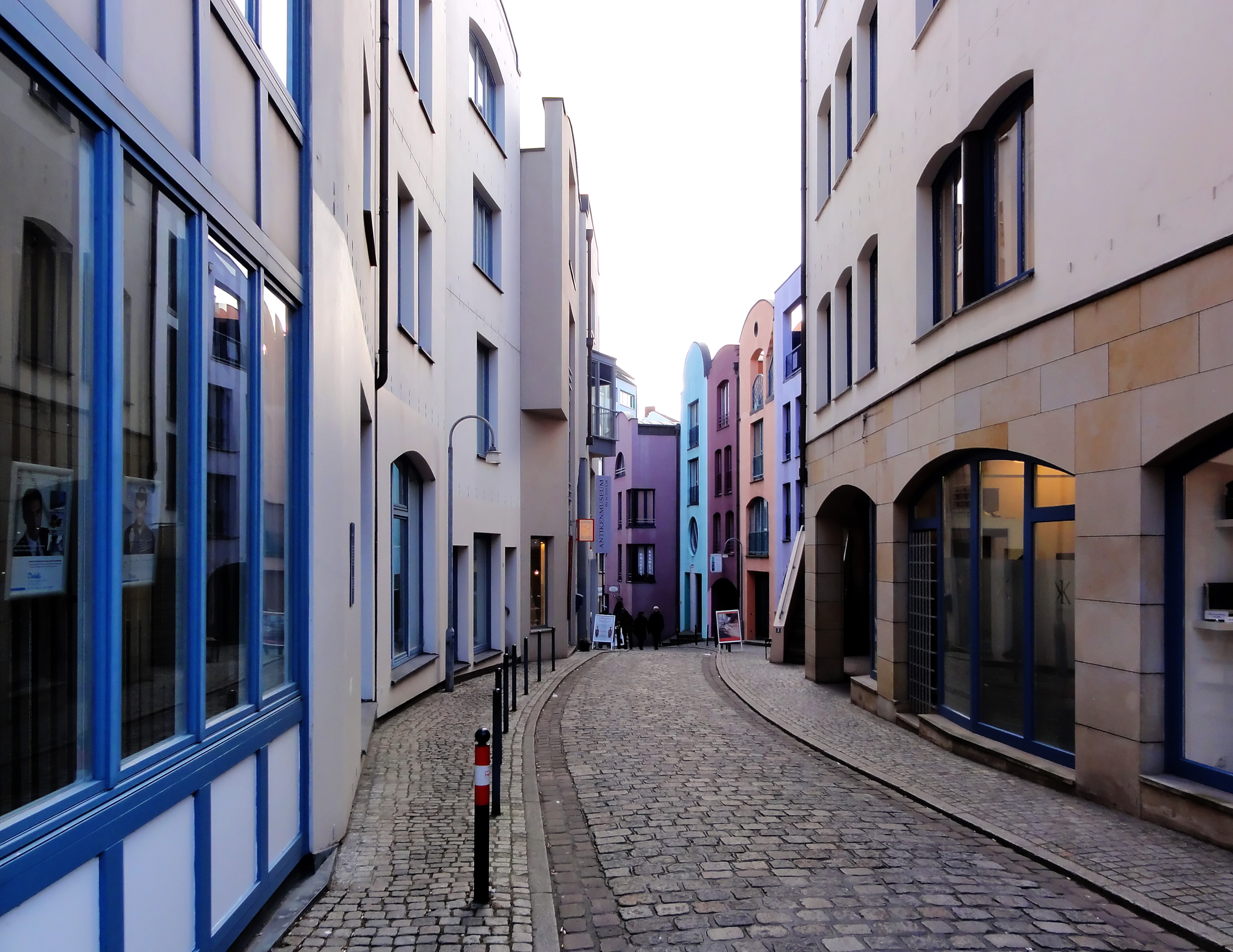
Marterburg, a street in Bremen

The Marterburg is a street in the Schnoor district of Bremen in the north of Germany. The name comes from Mattenburg as it was the place where the millers used to store flour in Matten (silos). The street runs from Ostertorstraße in a southwesterly direction curving slightly westwards before reaching the Tiefer near the river. Sidestreets include Kolpingstraße, Hinter der Balge and Schnoor. The street follows the old city wall which forms the rear of the houses on the eastern side, sometimes being used as part of their foundations. Many of the buildings to the south of Kolpingstraße are old listed buildings, several of which have been restored.

== Redevelopment ==
In the 1980s and 1990s, both sides of the Marterburg to the north of Kolpingstraße were redeveloped with residential and commercial buildings designed by Wolfram Goldapp and Thomas Klumpp. They sought to contribute to the character of this part of the old town by introducing the Postmodern style. The colourful, playfully conceived frontages contrast with the plain office buildings in the surroundings. The 27 houses included in the project have shops or offices on the ground floor with apartments in the upper storeys. Although the buildings have been criticized by some on the grounds of pseudoindividuality, most locals appreciate them and visitors count them among the city's attractions.

== Antique Museum ==
The Antikenmuseum im Schnoor located at No. 55-58 Martenburg exhibits one of Germany's finest collections of Greek vases with pieces from 560 BC to 350 BC, all from Athens.

== Legend ==
There is an old legend which purports to explain the name "Marterburg". It is said that at the beginning of the 10th century, a horde of Huns invaded the city, setting fire to the cathedral. They were frightened away by a thunderstorm, some of them seeking refuge in the narrow streets of the old town. But the housewives on either side of the street poured boiling oil on them from the upper windows, causing them all to suffer a martyr-like death.
