= Schnoor =

Neighbourhood in Bremen, Germany

Coordinates: 53°04′22″N 8°48′35″E

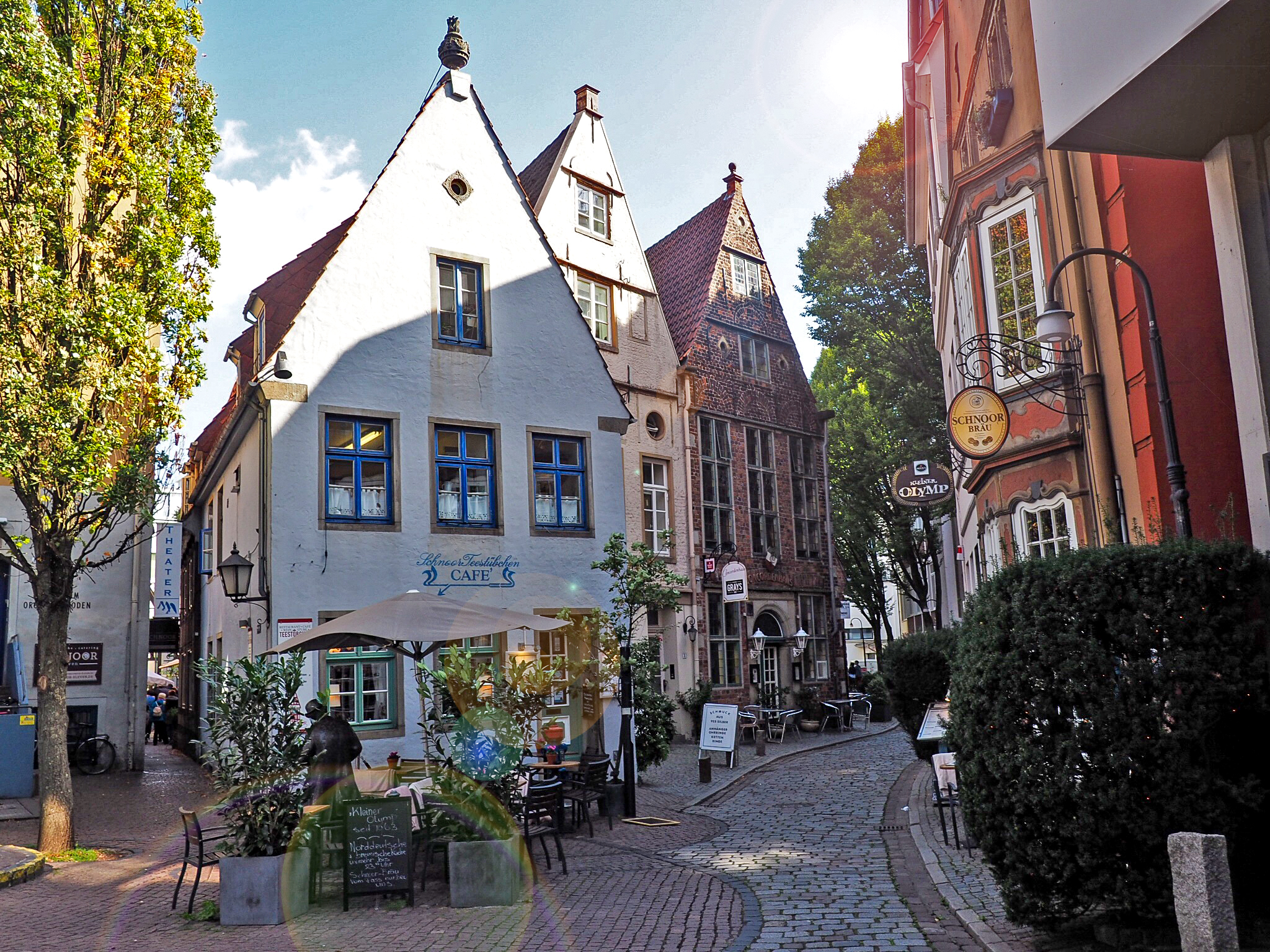
Schnoorviertel Bremen

Schnoor is a neighbourhood in the medieval centre of the German city of Bremen, and the only part of it that has preserved a medieval character. The neighbourhood owes its name to old handicrafts associated with shipping; the alleys between the houses were often associated with occupations or objects. For example, there was an area in which ropes and cables were made (Low German: Schnoor, 'string'), and a neighbouring area where wire cables and anchor chains were produced (Wieren, 'wire').

Schnoor is also the name of the main street in this neighbourhood. Another street in the neighbourhood is Marterburg.

== History ==
In Hanseatic Bremen, the Schnoor was one of the poorer parts. While rich merchants settled in the Obernstraße ('upper street'), ober both geographically (being at the ridge of a dune) and socially, and in the Langenstraße ('long street', along the Balge, Bremen's first harbour), the Schnoor developed as a district of fishermen in the 10th century. The inhabitants built thatched cottages on the little island between the rivers Weser and Balge. Therefore, during its first centuries it was liable to flooding.

The first ferry service in Bremen was established here, and the first bridge crossing the Weser was built around the year 1240. An old wall and parts of a round tower erected around 1200 are extant near Marterburg.

In the 13th century Franciscan friars settled, and their St John's church was constructed in the following decades.

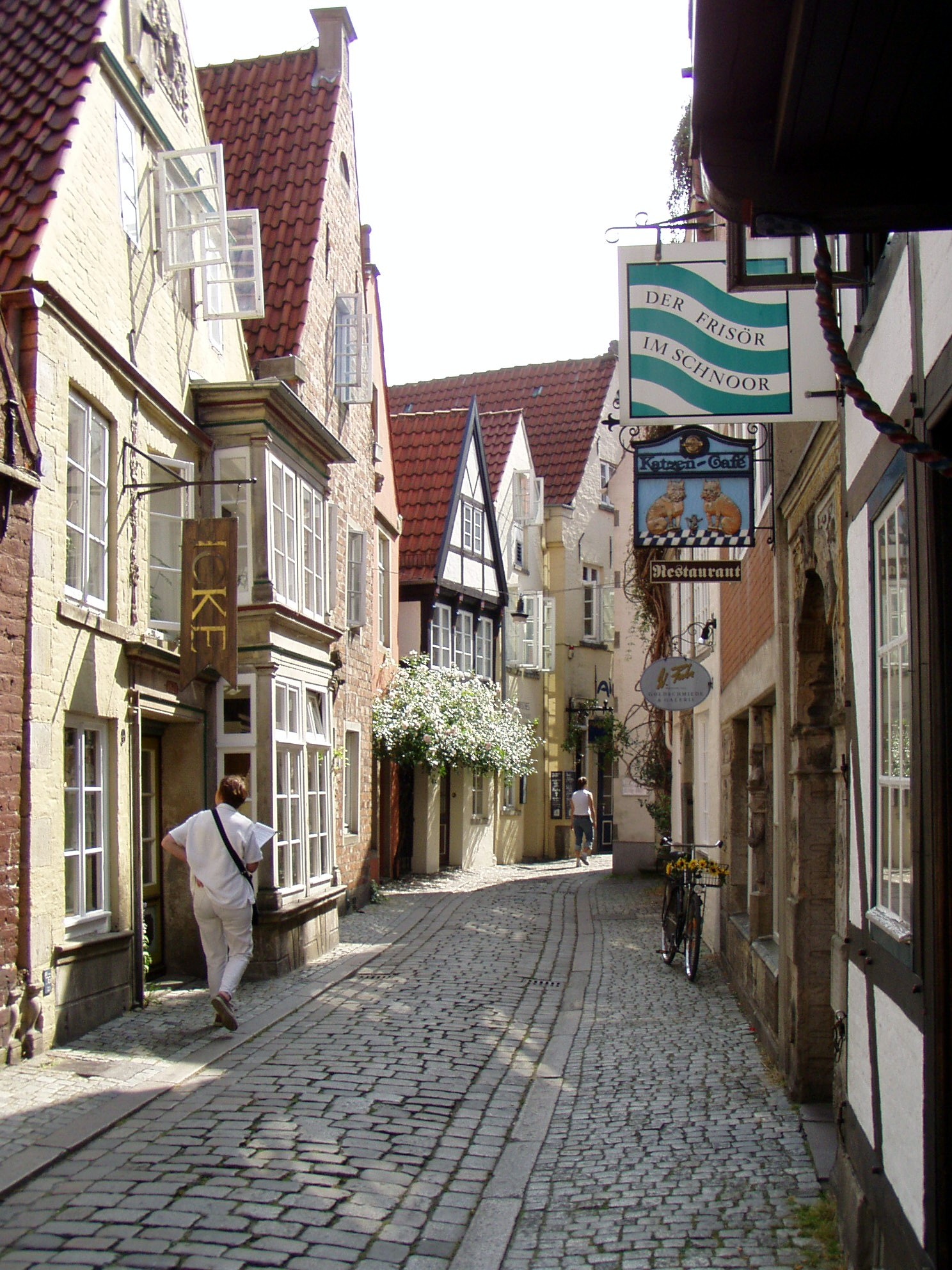
The Schnoor in August 2004

== Development ==
Today the oldest houses in the Schnoor date back to the 15th century, although most houses are from the 17th and 18th centuries. While other parts of Bremen developed with plots of about one square kilometre (250 acres) and merchant's villas, the plots in the Schnoor have areas that are just enough for a single house of around 55 square metres (590 sq ft). The narrow streets were not suitable for the increase in traffic from the 19th century, and the quarter became one of the poorest parts of Bremen, a situation that meant renovations were unaffordable. During World War II the Schnoor suffered only slight damage, so that owners of the houses had to pay a Lastenausgleich ('burden sharing') after 1945. By the mid-1950s the houses were in a pitiable state.

The Senate of the Free Hanseatic Town of Bremen decided in 1959 to rebuild the historic area of the Schnoor. House owners were invited to restore rundown buildings with financial support from the state of Bremen. This development was in contrast to the common practice in many towns and cities in Germany and Europe until the late 1970s.

The situation changed with the Venice Charter for the Conservation and Restoration of Monuments and Sites in 1964 so that in 1973 the Schnoor became an historic district under official heritage conservation through the state monument authority.

One of the most famous houses that has been preserved in its original state is the Schifferhaus ('shipper's house') in the street of Stavendamm. Another historic building is the Landherrnamt ('landlord's office') dating to 1856, which initially housed the authorities administering the state of Bremen.

The Birgittenkloster ('convent of Saint Birgitta'), a small Bridgettine convent founded in October 2002 is located in the Schnoor, as is St John's Church, a listed building with a history going back to the 14th century.

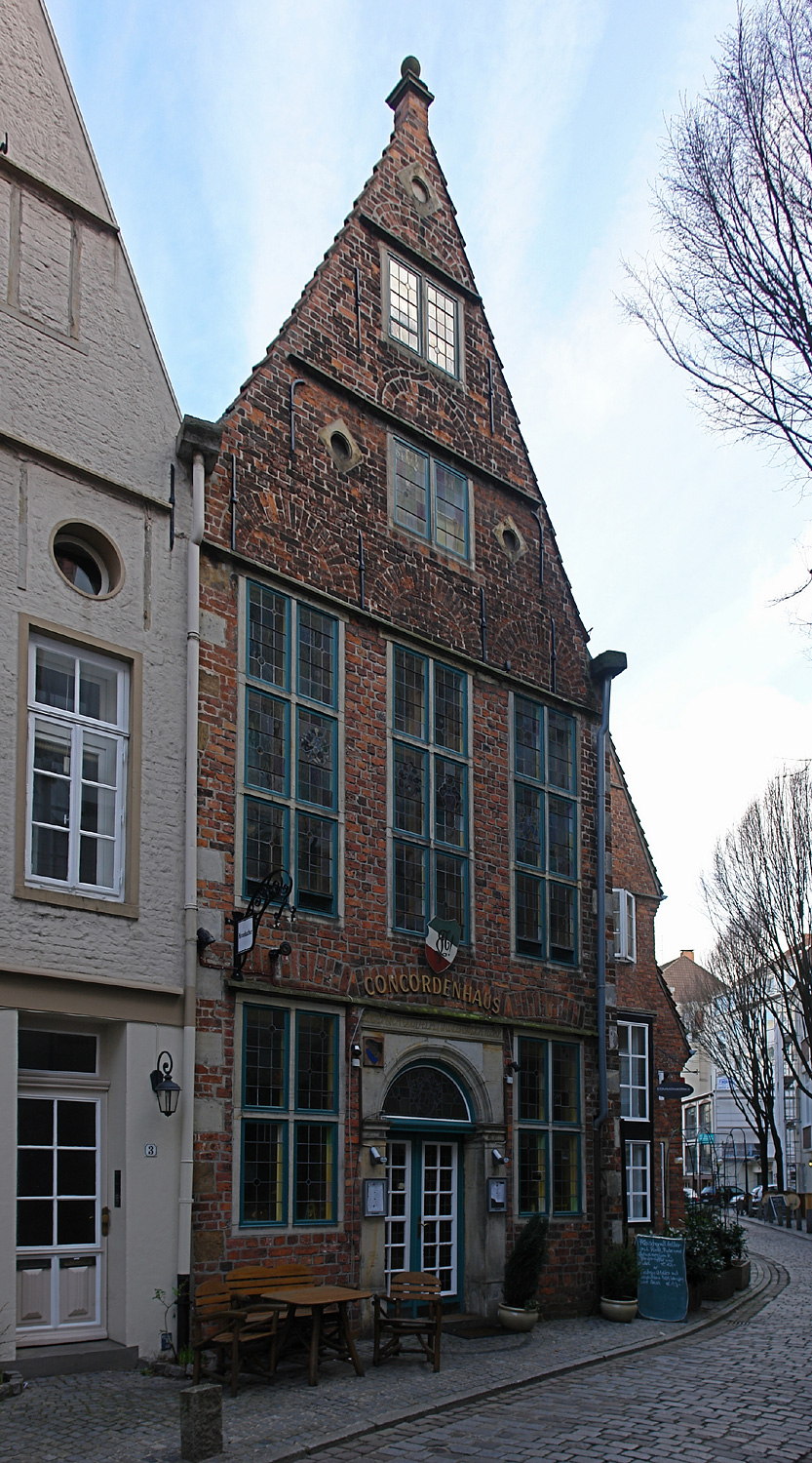
Concordenhaus ('concordia house'), dating to 1630

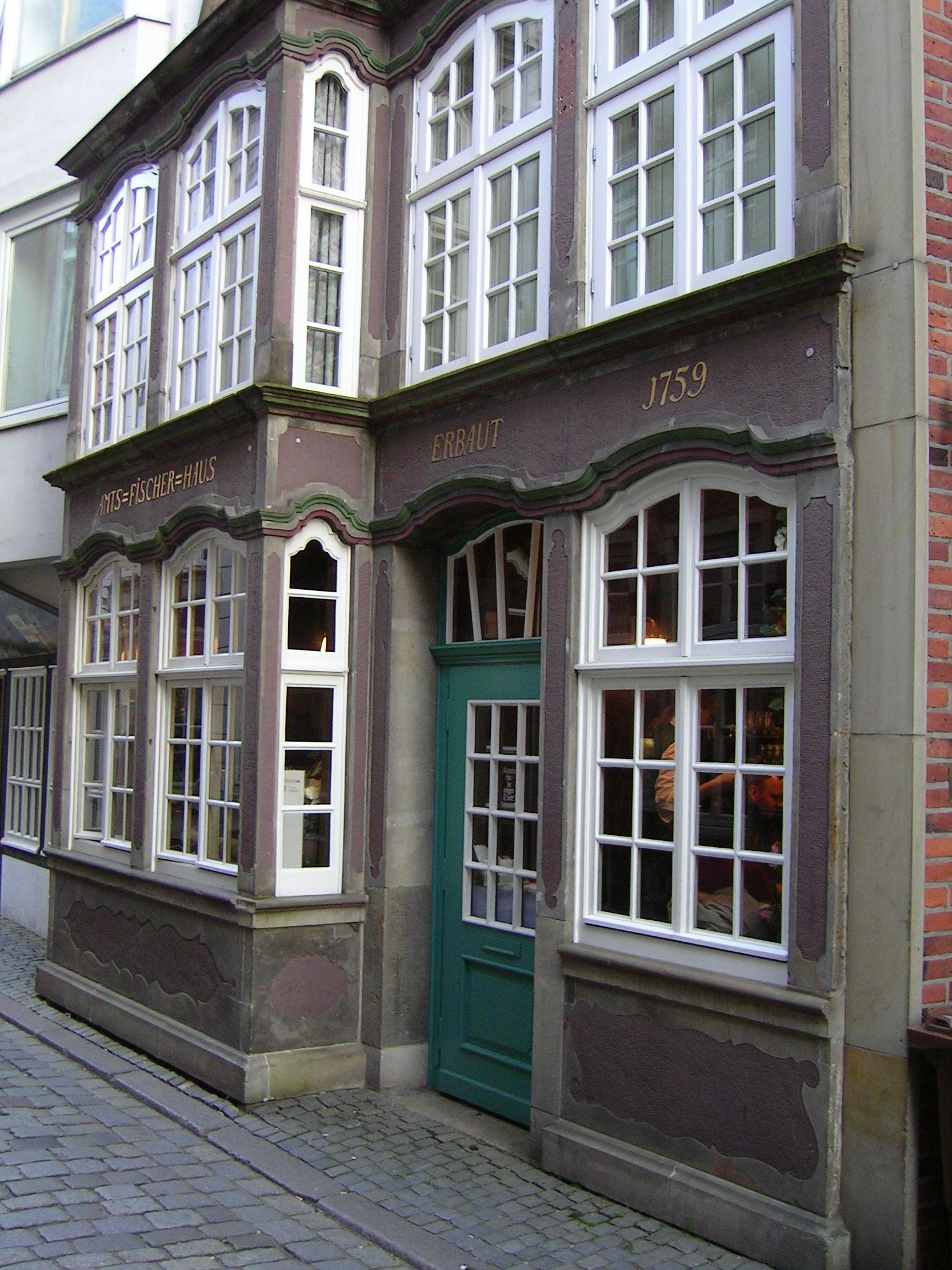
Façade of Amtsfischerhaus ('official fisheries house'), dating to 1759

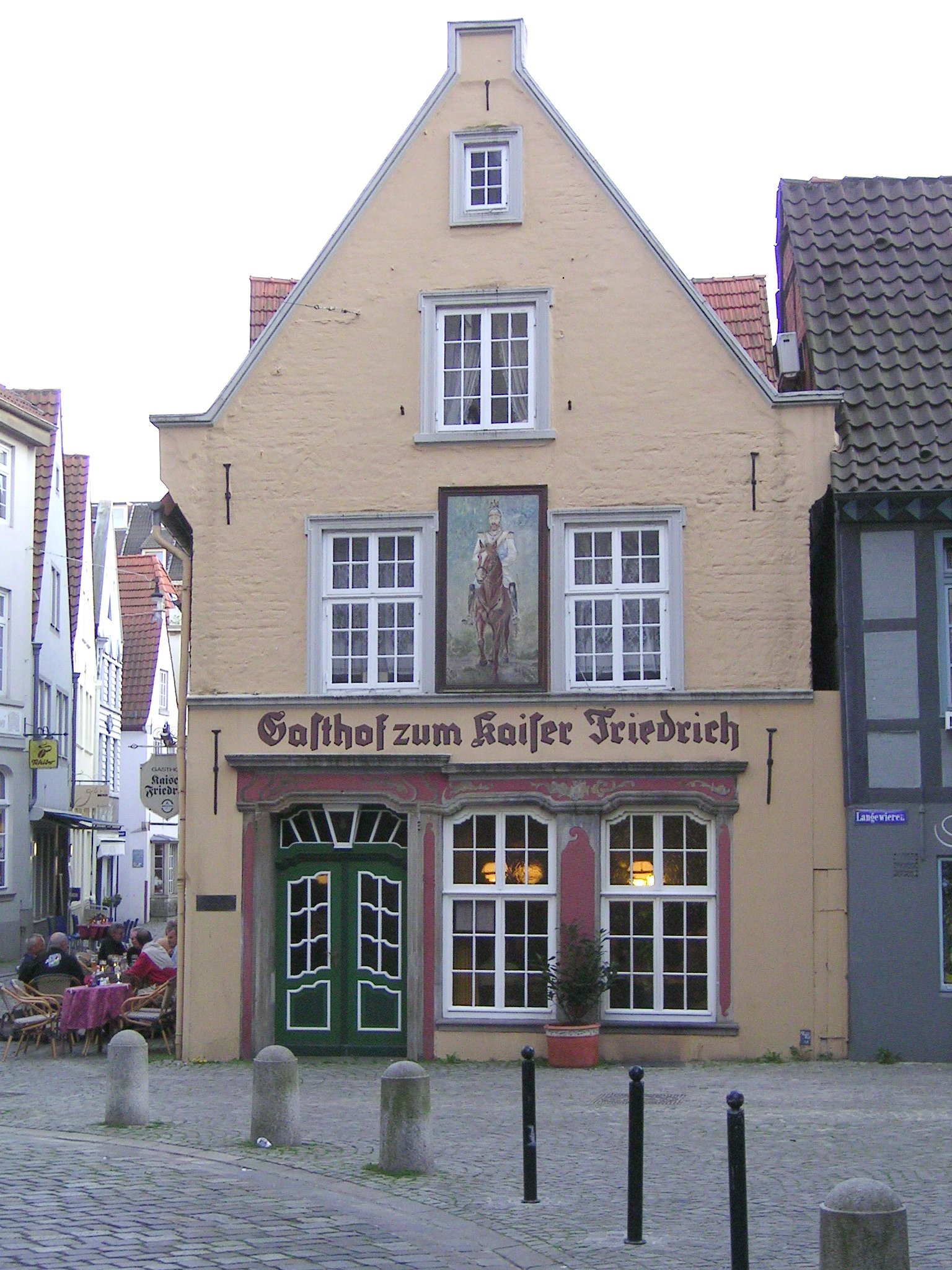
Restaurant Kaiser Friedrich ('emperor Frederick'), dating to 1630

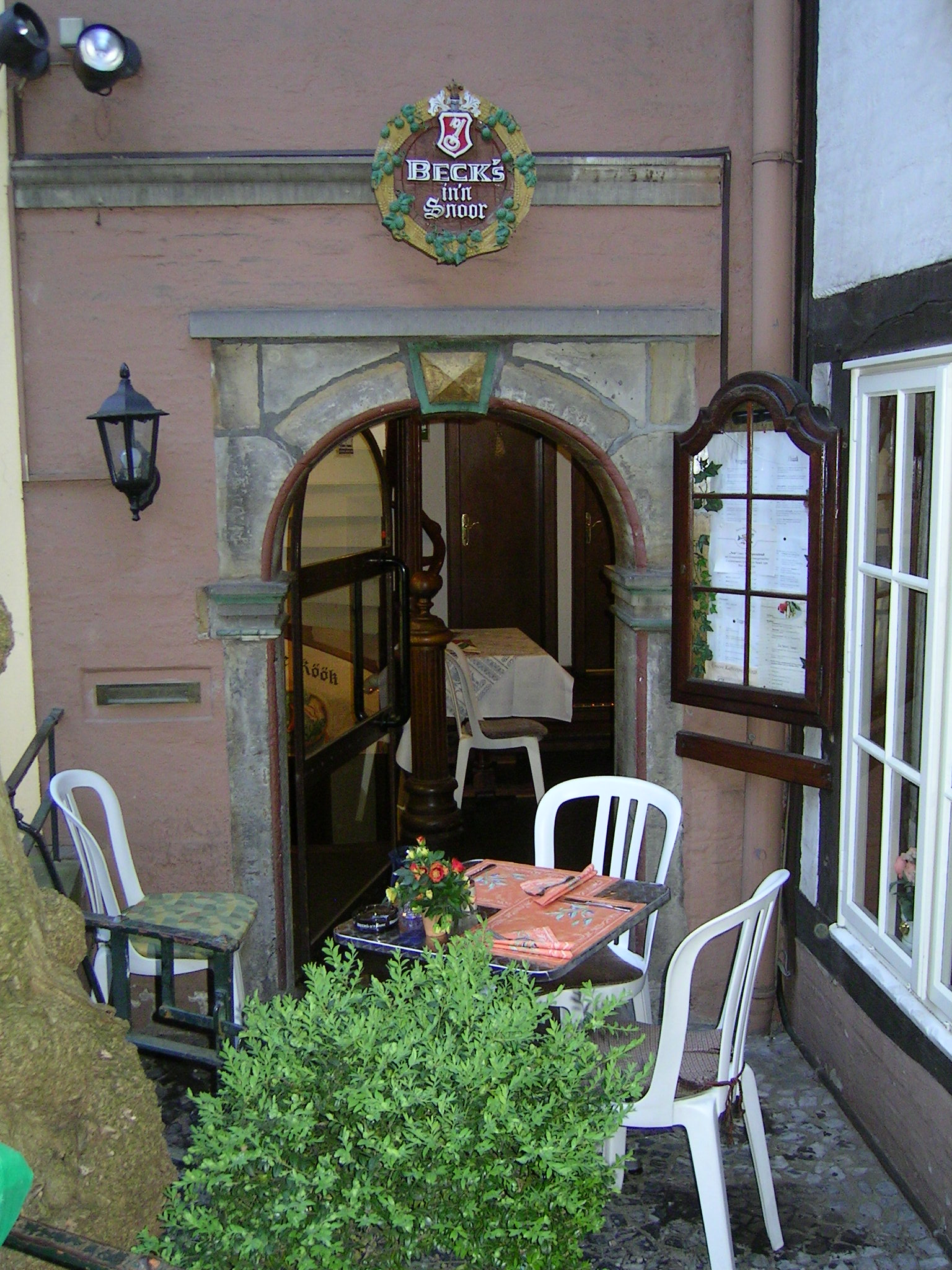
New restaurant in an old house

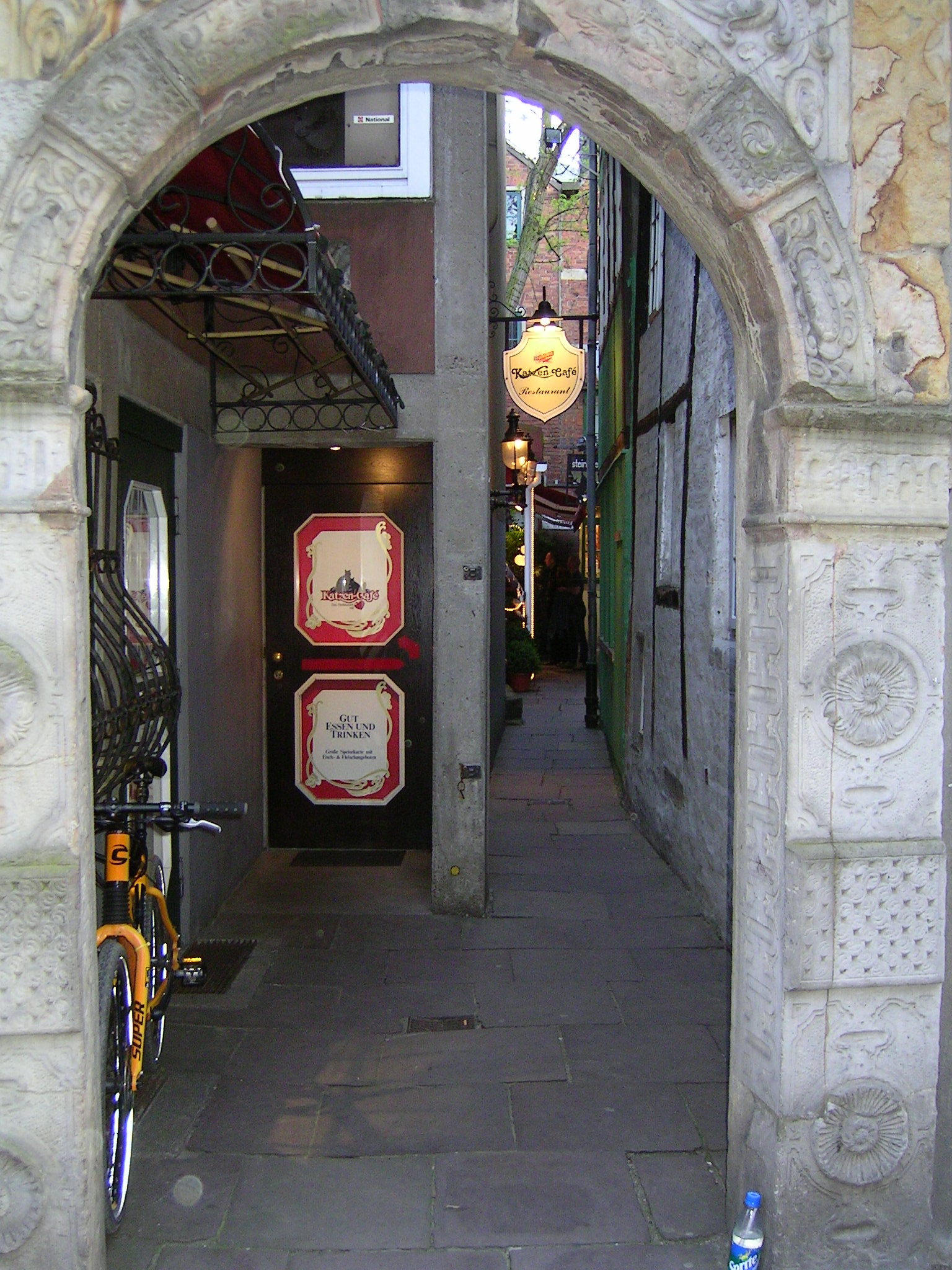
Entrance to Katzencafé ('cats café')

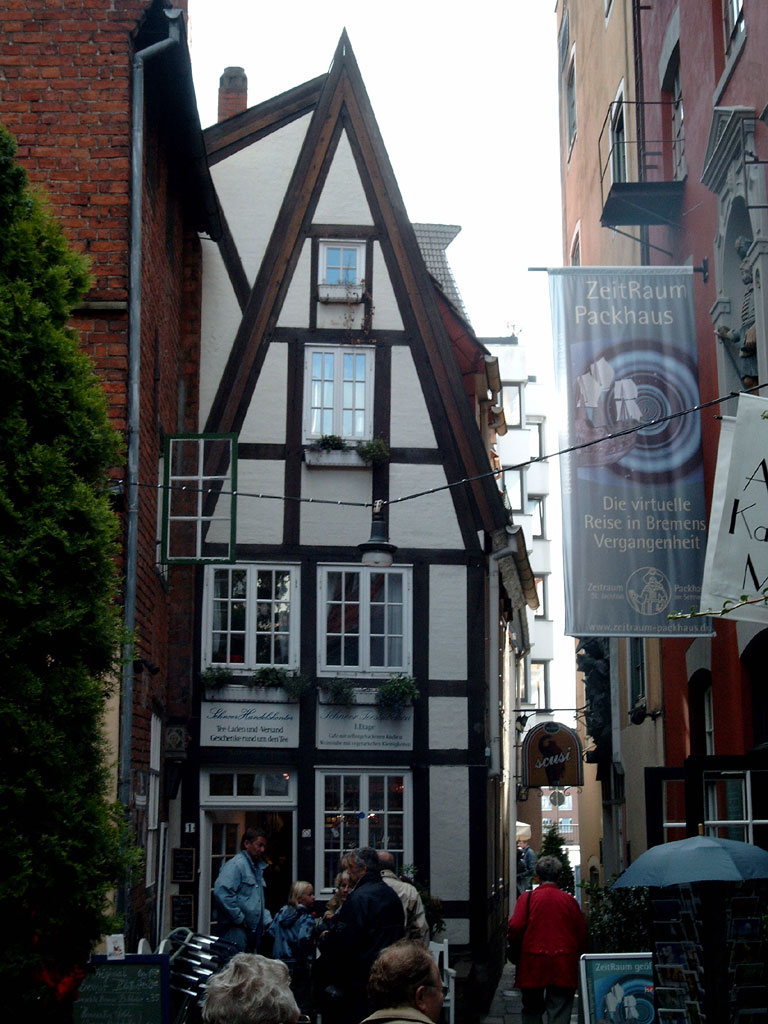
Tea house in street Hinter der Holzpforte ('behind the wooden gate')

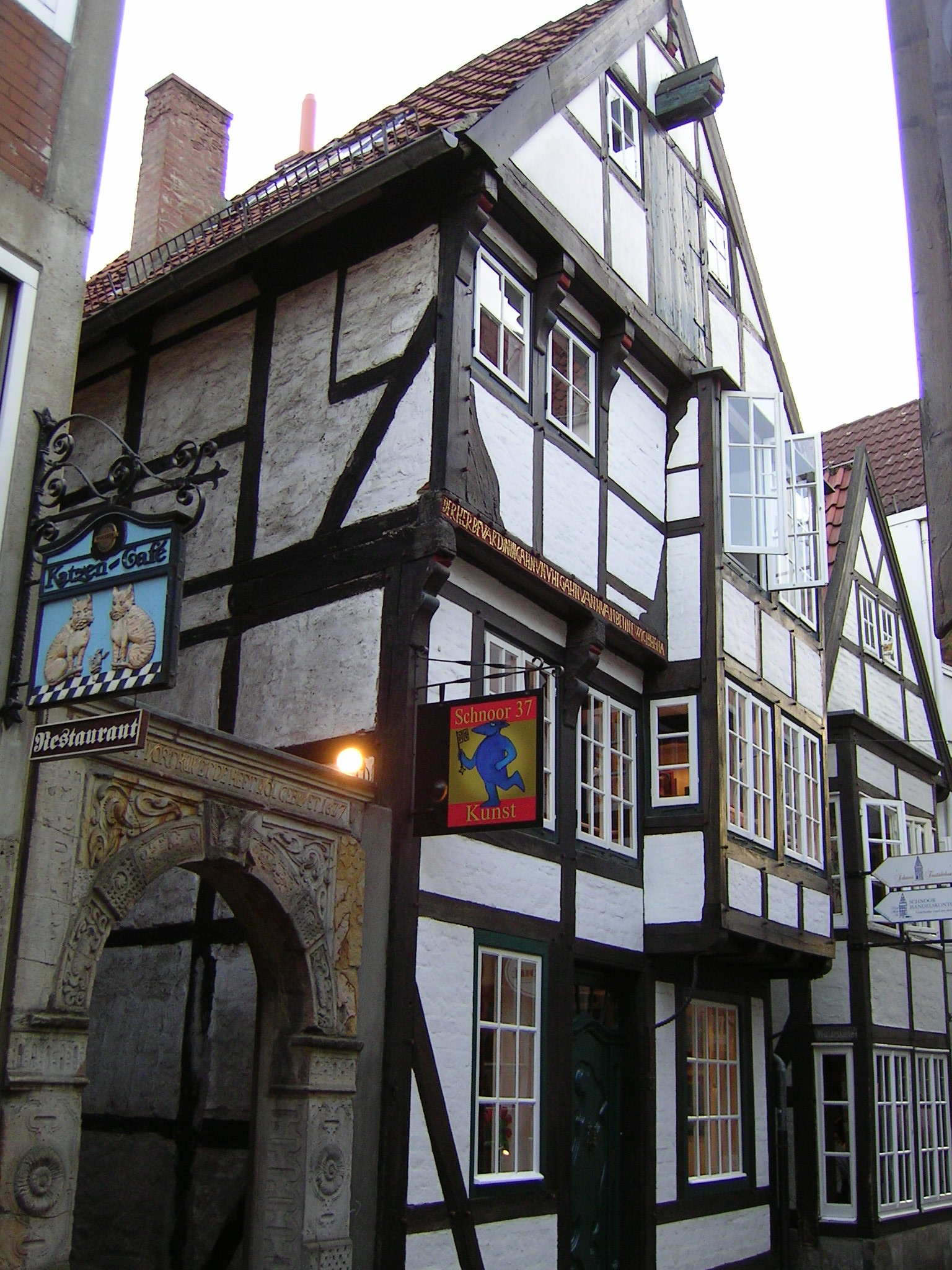
Schnoor 37 ('number 37 Schnoor'), dating to 1601

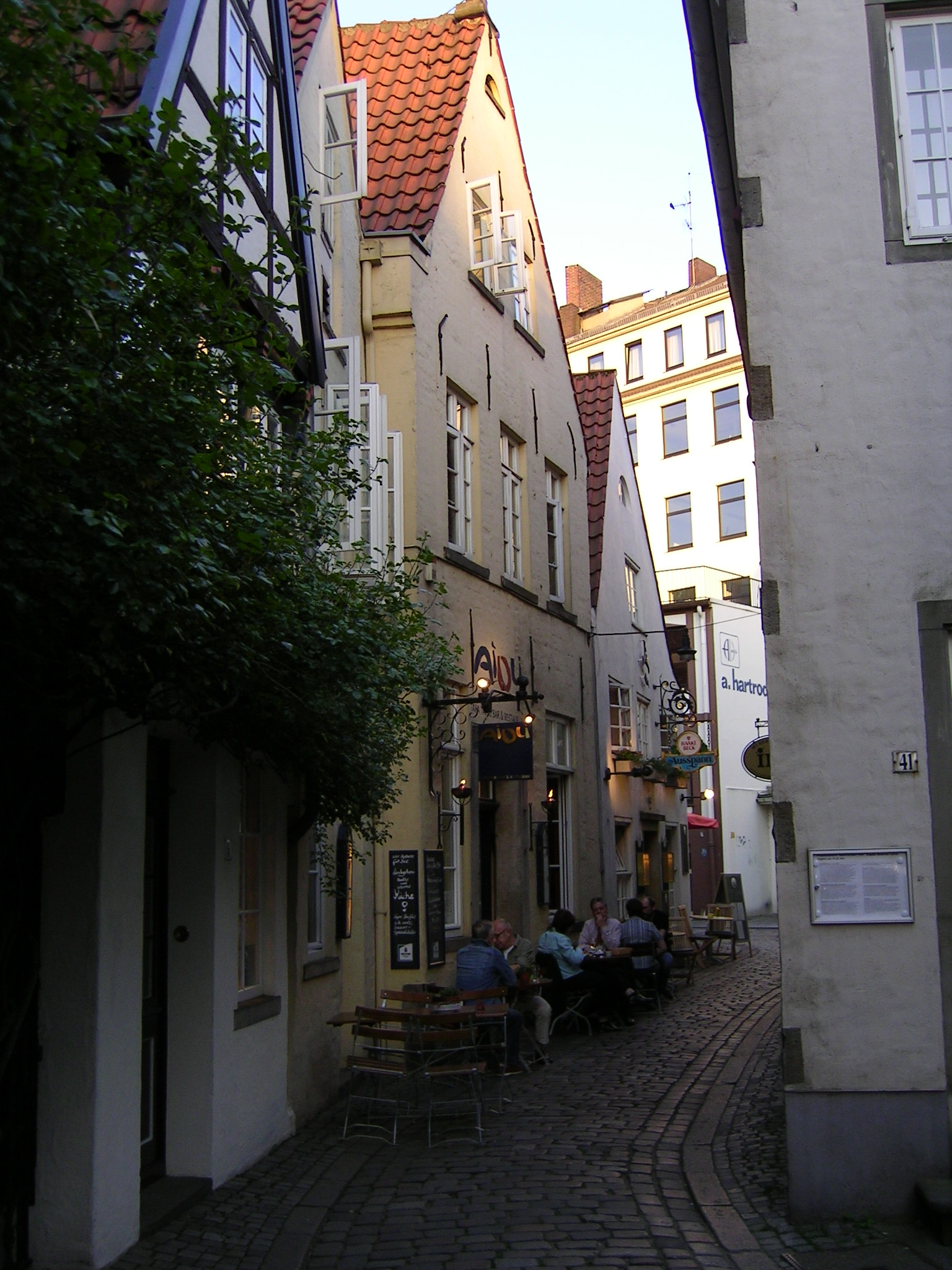
Part of the street Schnoor, way to the new houses

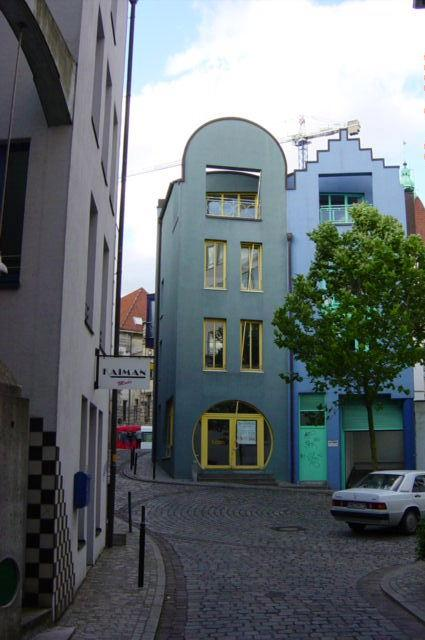
New houses, end of 20th century

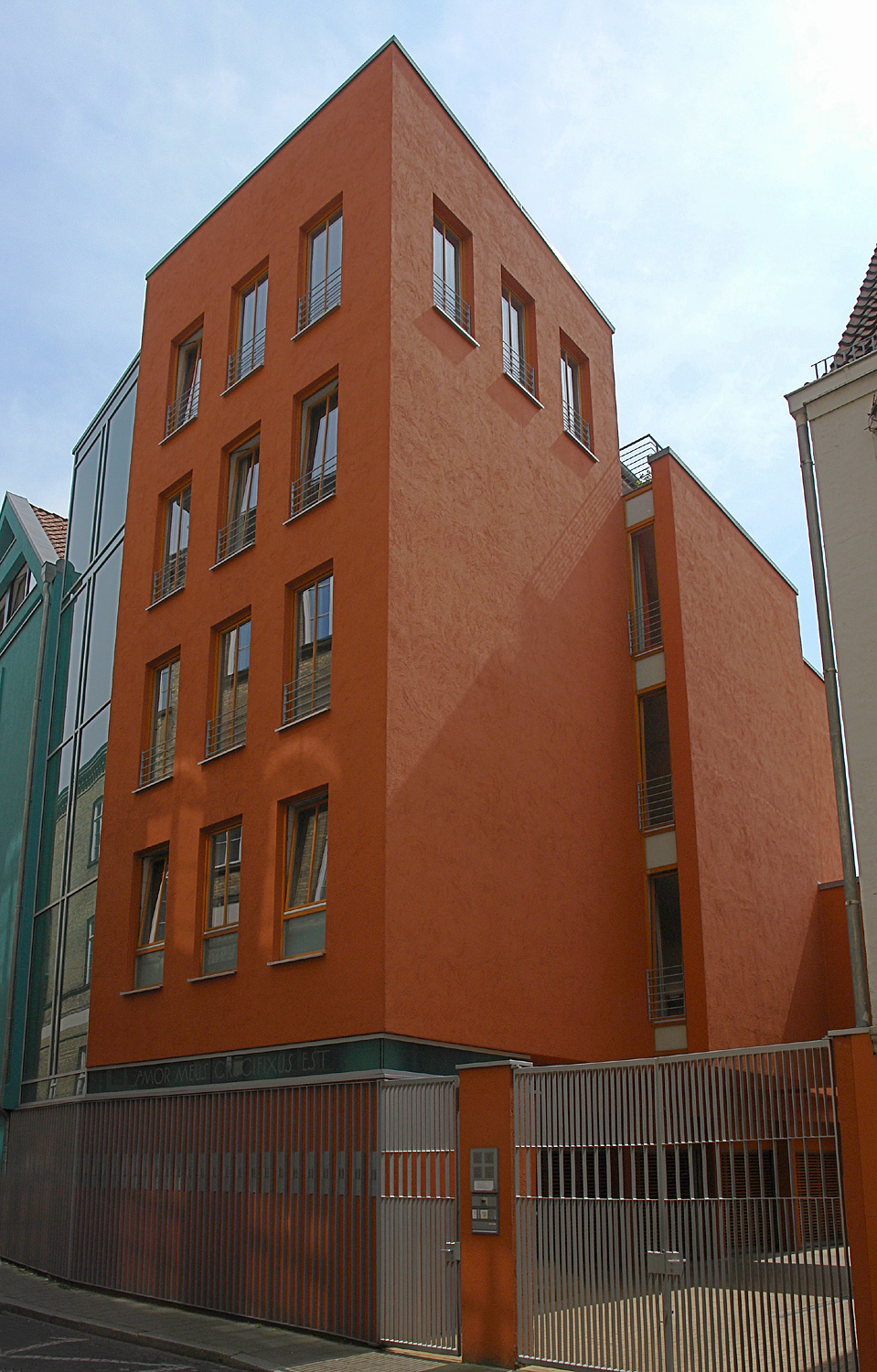
Birgittenkloster

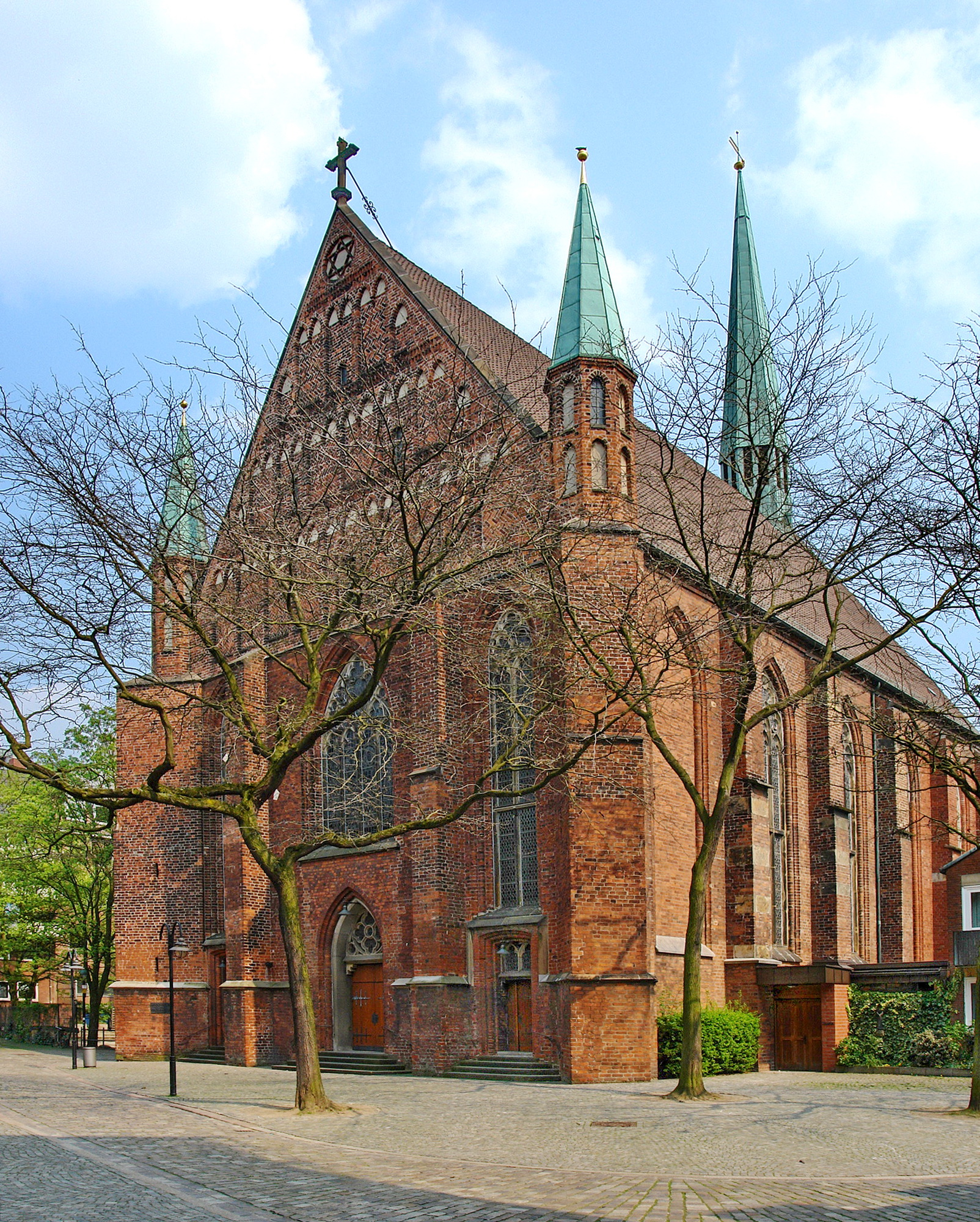
St John's Church

== General references ==
- Schnoor: A portrait (in German, English, French, and Spanish). Bremen: Temmen. 2004. ISBN 9783861089087.
