= Balge (river) =

River in Germany

Location
- Country: Germany
- Location: Bremen

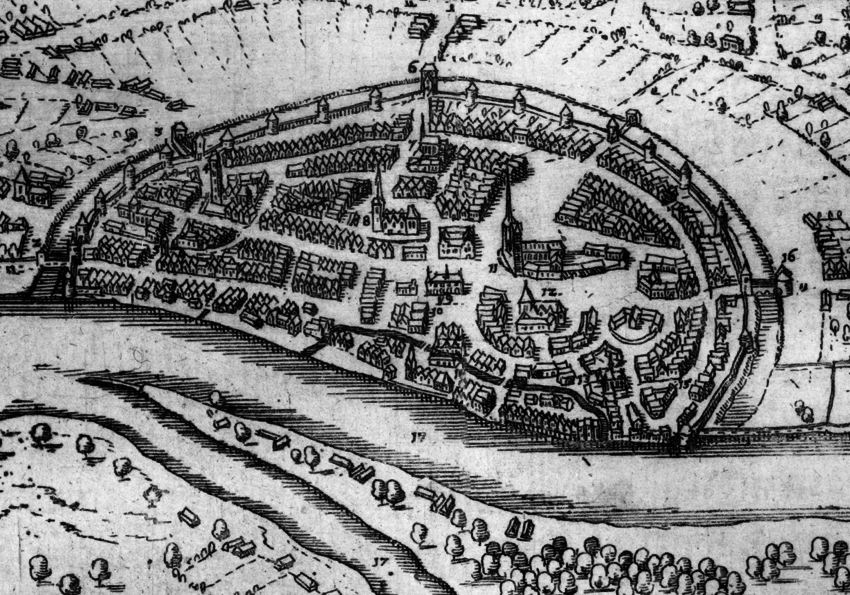
The Balge in the 13th century. It flowed around the districts of Martini and Tiefer, flanking the Market Square

The Balge (also known as the Balje) was a short branch of the Weser on its eastern side, running through what is now the centre of Bremen. As it served as a harbour in the early Middle Ages, it significantly contributed to Bremen's development as a port. The river gradually narrowed until in 1608, it was canalised. In 1838, it was completely filled with earth.

== Early Middle Ages ==
At the time when the diocese was founded, the low-lying land around Bremen was swampy with several islands formed by the Weser and its branches. In 1988/1989 construction work involving excavations at the corner of Martinistrasse and Wachtstrasse revealed three small waterway channels from around the year 800 in an area of 50 m × 40 m (160 ft × 130 ft). There was also a river boat from the 9th century. From the 9th century onwards, the terrain changed significantly, partly as a result of floods which brought sand into the area, partly through increased human settlement. Gradually, the marshes and the river's minor branches disappeared.

The Balge, together with the Kleine Weser (Little Weser), was one such branch. The theory that the Balge might at some time have been the main stream of the Weser has never been proven. Originally, the Balge left the Weser at Altenwall. In a bend stretching over some 650 m (2,130 ft), it ran almost parallel to the main river along the Bremer Düne. It became separated from the Weser by some 200 m (660 ft) at the Marktplatz before rejoining it and opening up like a funnel at the “Zweite Schlachtpforte”. The island between the Schlachte and the Weser covered roughly today's Martini and Tiefer districts. Originally, the width of the Balge varied from about 30 to 50 m (98 to 164 ft).

== First port of Bremen ==
When the diocese of Bremen was founded in the 8th century, the site for cathedral and bishop's residence was chosen at the point of contact of the two most important geographical features of the area: the Weser and the “Bremer Düne” (Bremen Dune). The Weser opened the way to the long-distance trade routes while the Dune offered protection against floods and enemy attacks. Bremen's first harbour was located along the north bank of the Balge. It is assumed that ships moored on both sides of the Balge, over a stretch of several hundred metres. The Langenstraße, one of the city's oldest streets and one of the most important streets for the city's merchants, no doubt originated at the time when one of the first settlements grew up on the right bank of the Balge. In 13th century sea vessels became too large for the Balge. On the bank of main Weser river a new quay was built, called Schlachte. Since then the importance of the old Balge harbour decreased. Nevertheless, both harbours were used until the 16th century, the Schlachte for sea-going ships and the Balge for flat-bottomed vessels and river barges. Finally in 1602, the Balge was closed for traffic of boats.

The Balge's banks were subsequently reinforced in several stages. When excavations were carried out in 1970 at the Bankhaus Neelmeyer (close to where the Böttcherstrasse joins the Marktplatz), remains of the harbour sides, fortified with masonry, together with dolphins, were found. The dolphins were made from oak piles tied together with iron rings in groups of three. Similar discoveries had already been made in 1909 at the corner of Marktplatz and Langenstrasse and in 1862 near the Schütting and Wachtstrasse. Evidence of an even older structure was found: a bank reinforcement made from piles and wickerwork, presumably built before the 10th century. The other structures consisting of stone and brick are assumed to have been made in medieval or late medieval times (between 11th and 15th centuries). The market place probably stems for its role as a harbour-side market, with ships mooring along its south bank.

== Medieval and late medieval period ==
While the Balge had originally been quite wide, it narrowed over time as a result of buildings constructed on its banks as the city developed combined with changes in the river network and silting. In late medieval times, the width of the Balge had been reduced to some 20 m (66 ft). Otherwise it would not have been possible to erect the Schütting where there had once been a river bed.

In the 13th century after the Balge had already ceased to serve as a harbour for larger ships (which were moored instead at the Schlachte), an artificial channel was constructed between the Balge and the Weser, designed to improve the flow of water between the two rivers. Until then, the Balge had gradually been filled with sand and refuse. After the channel was established, the upper portion of the Balge was known as "Klosterbalge" and the lower part, "Grosse Balge". In order to improve the city's defences, the channel into the upper portion of the Balge was closed, making it impossible to be penetrated by enemy forces. The "Klosterbalge" became a dead end, receiving rain and waste water only from the adjacent buildings. But at that time, the "Grosse Balge" was still used by ships. In 1399, the council of Bremen ruled in a decree called "Balgeverordnung" that so-called "Eken" (flat river boats made of oak with a width of approximately 1.5 meters and a length between 3.5 and 10 meters) could no longer moor in the Balge for more than three days and three nights as they would otherwise present an obstacle to boat traffic.

In 1602, the Balge was closed to boats. In 1608, a channel with a width of 4.6 m (15 ft) was established specifically for drainage. In 1819, the Senate of Bremen decided that the Balge should be filled in over its entire length and that it should be replaced by a waste water channel 1.20 m (3 ft 11 in) in width. As a result of formal objections relating to specific rights and competing interests of the Balge residents, work was not completed until 1838 when the Balge completely disappeared from the City of Bremen.

== Bridges ==
From medieval times, several bridges crossed the Balge:

- The Große Stintbrücke (mentioned in documents as Pontis Piscium from 1261). It crossed the Balge from the south-east corner of the Marktplatz.
- The Kleine Stintbrücke connected Hankenstrasse and Bredenstrasse.
- The Balgebrücke was the connection between the two parts of the Balgebrückstrasse.
- The Hohe Brücke crossed the vlootgote at the Tiefer.
- A stone bridge served as a link for both ends of the Wachtstrasse.
- A bridge crossed the Klosterbalge at St. Victors Staven at the Tiefer.
- The Schüttingbrücke crossed the Balge as part of Böttcherstrasse.
- It is assumed that there was another bridge crossing the Balge at the point where it was connected to the Weser river at the second Schlachtpforte.

The bridges were probably drawbridges enabling ships and boats to sail past even if the water level was high. All the bridges continued to be exist until the end of the 18th century. They were gradually dismantled after the Balge was filled in.

== Lasting traces ==
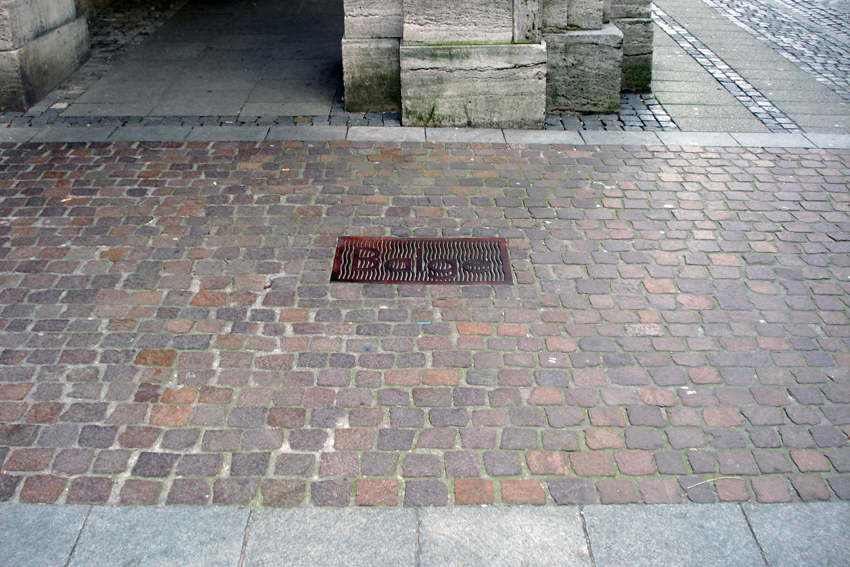
Indication of the previous course of the Balge at the Stint bridge

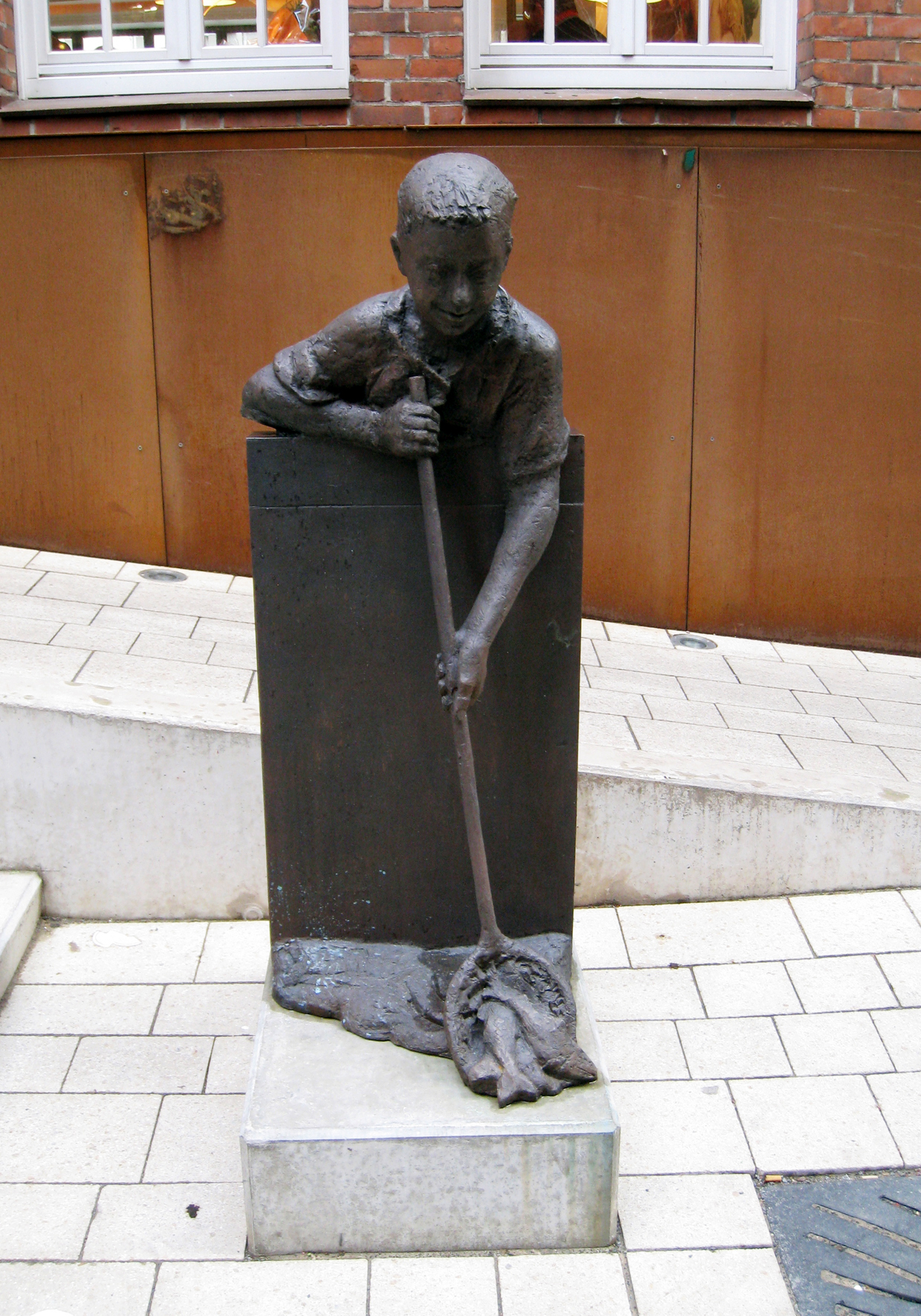
Fietje Balge by Bernd Altenstein

From 1990/1991 onwards, the original route of the Balge was indicated in several parts of the old town by means of bronze plaques and by a different kind of paving. This was done on the recommendation of Senator Harald Lucht, head of cadastral services (today GeoInformation Bremen). The Balge appears as a narrow channel from the 18th century, at the Schlachte, at the Stintbrücke, at the Wachtstrasse and at the Balgebrückstrasse where the junction between Grosse Balge and Klosterbalge is indicated.

In addition, several street names are reminiscent of the Balge and its original route:

- Stintbrücke: leads from the corner of Langenstrasse / Marktplatz to the Bredenstrasse, passing the Schütting
- Balgebrückstrasse: connects Domsheide with Wilhelm-Kaisen-Brücke
- Hinter der Balge: a narrow street branching off from the Marterburg in Schnoor

A bronze sculpture Fietje Balge by the sculptor Bernd Altenstein donated in 2007 by Bankhaus Carl F. Plump & Co. was erected in the street Hinter dem Schütting, near the Spitzen Gebel tavern, in memory of the Balge. A nearby plaque explains the history of the Balge and a QRpedia code links to this article.

== New discoveries ==
In the beginning of 2008, there were excavations on Bredenplatz, at the corner of Bredenstrasse and Martinistrasse, where a new hotel was to be built. They revealed the remains of the Balge river bank reinforcements, dated to around the year 1000. The structure consisted of wood piles, horizontal boards and wicker work. Findings also included objects lost in mud, including a silver denarius (a coin from Cologne), a dagger, a silver fibula and a pair of ice skates made from bones.

In 2009, repair work took place in the Schifferhaus Shipper's House in Bremen. The bank reinforcement of the Klosterbalge was investigated which, like the Grosse Balge, had served as an underground waste water channel.

== See also ==
- List of rivers of Bremen
