= Birgittenkloster Bremen =

Bridgettine convent in Bremen, Germany

Coordinates: 53°4′24″N 8°48′35″E

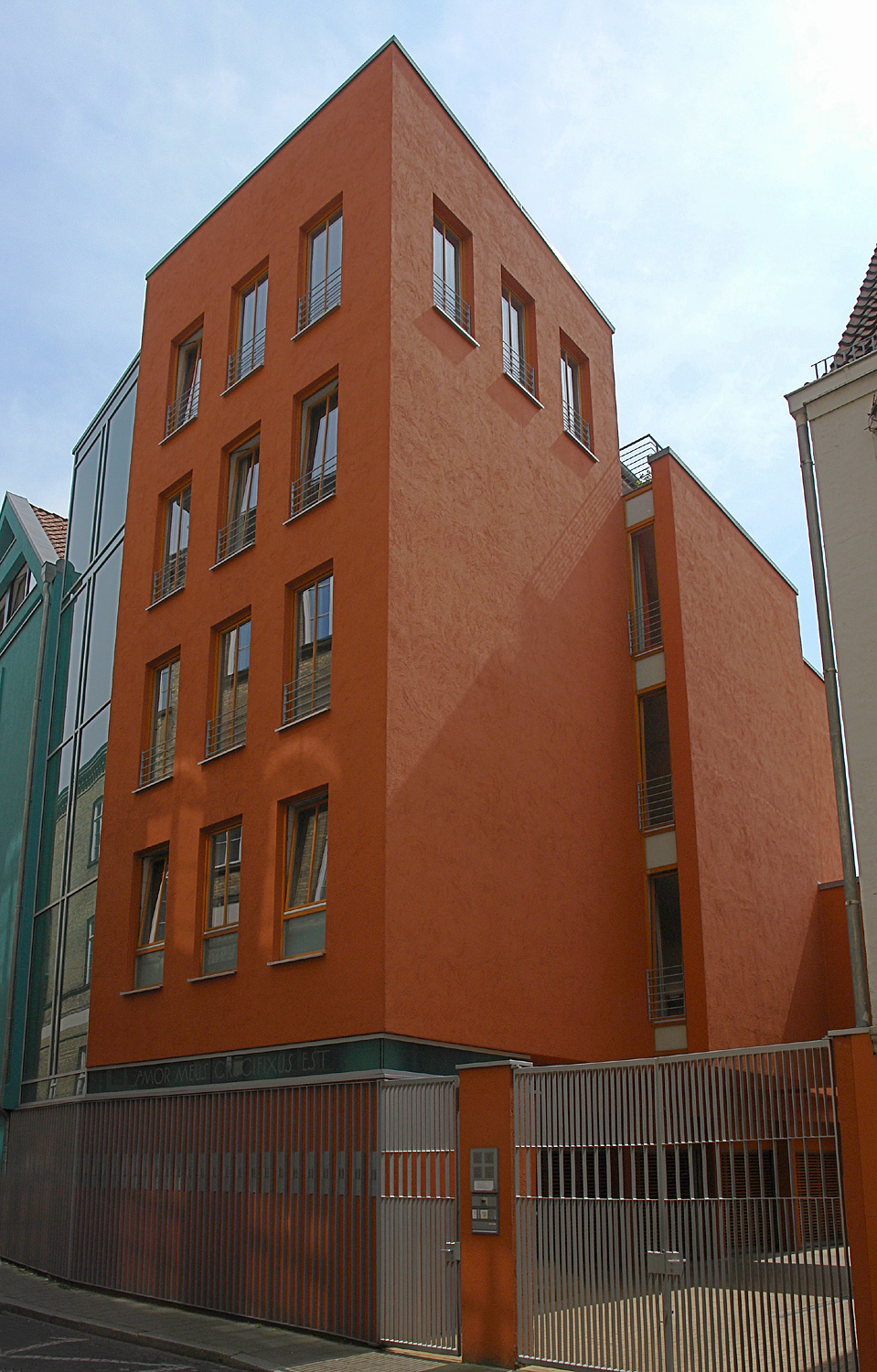
Birgittenkloster, Bremen

The Birgittenkloster (Convent of Saint Birgitta) is a Bridgettine convent in Bremen, Germany, founded in October 2002. The first convent to be founded in Bremen since the Reformation, it has adopted an ecumenical role in line with the teachings of Saint Bridget.

== Description ==
The idea of creating a new convent in Bremen was born in 1998 during the Deanery Pastoral Conference (Dekanatspastoralkonferenz) thanks to the inspiration of Maria Elisabeth Hesselblad who had established the new order in 1911 and the synergy between the Abbess General Mother Tekla in Rome and Franz-Josef Bode, Bishop of Osnabrück. Bremen was specifically chosen as the location for Germany's first Bridgettine convent.

Designed by Ulrich Tilgner, the convent is located in the Schnoor district of the city on the site of a former bakery. In addition to the chapel and living quarters, there is a guest house with 12 rooms. The nuns take care of the guests and prepare their meals. Seven nuns from Mexico, India, Italy, Poland and Germany currently live in the convent, headed by Sister Giovanna Gonzalez from Mexico. The day begins with morning prayers at 6.15 am and finishes at 8.50 pm with evening prayers.

== Architecture ==
Set in one of the picturesque streets of the Schnoor, the complex consists of three interconnected structures: the tower-like building overlooking the street with guest rooms, the two-storey nuns' wing set back from the street with a forecourt, and the chapel which is accessed through a small garden. The location of the living quarters between the chapel and the guest accommodation provides for optimal functionality while supporting a life of ora et labora (prayer and work) defined by the order. While the chapel can be reached directly from inside the convent, visitors can enter via the garden (except during daily prayers). In contrast to the vivid terracotta-coloured exterior, the chapel interior is finished in a bright white facing, exuding Scandinavian simplicity. The rear glazed wall takes the form of a cross, reflecting the order's motto: Amor meus crucifixus est (My love is the crucified one).

On the occasion of the convent's 10th anniversary, Ulrich Tilgner, the architect, explained that it had been no easy matter to design the building within the 1,000 m^{2} (11,000 sq ft) of free space, given the heritage restrictions regulating the surroundings and the rather limited funding.

== Hospitality ==
With 12 rooms accommodating up to 18 guests, the convent welcomes both individuals and groups wishing to escape from the hustle and bustle of everyday life.

== Literature ==
- Wilhelm Tacke: Klöster in Bremen. Über 800 Jahre Konfessionsgeschichte der Freien Hansestadt Bremen.. Edition Temmen, Bremen 2005, ISBN 3-86108-545-3.
- Rudolf Matzner: Der Bremer Klosterochsenzug. Bremer Kloster- und Kirchengeschichten. Interessantes, Unbekanntes und Kurioses. Druckerpresse-Verlag, Lilienthal 2011, pp 29-.
