= Bernd Altenstein =

German Sculptor and University lecturer

- Born: 29 April 1943 (age 82); Schlossberg, East Prussia

Bernd Altenstein (born 29 April 1943) is a German Sculptor and University lecturer.

== Life ==
Altenstein was born in Schlossberg, East Prussia. He studied Art in Stuttgart and worked at the University of the Arts in Bremen from 1975 to 2009. His sculpture is available at various public locations in Germany.

A bronze sculpture Fietje Balge, commissioned by Bankhaus Carl F. Plump & Co., was erected in the street Hinter dem Schütting in memory of the Balge river and its harbour]. A nearby plaque explains the history of the Balge.

== Works ==
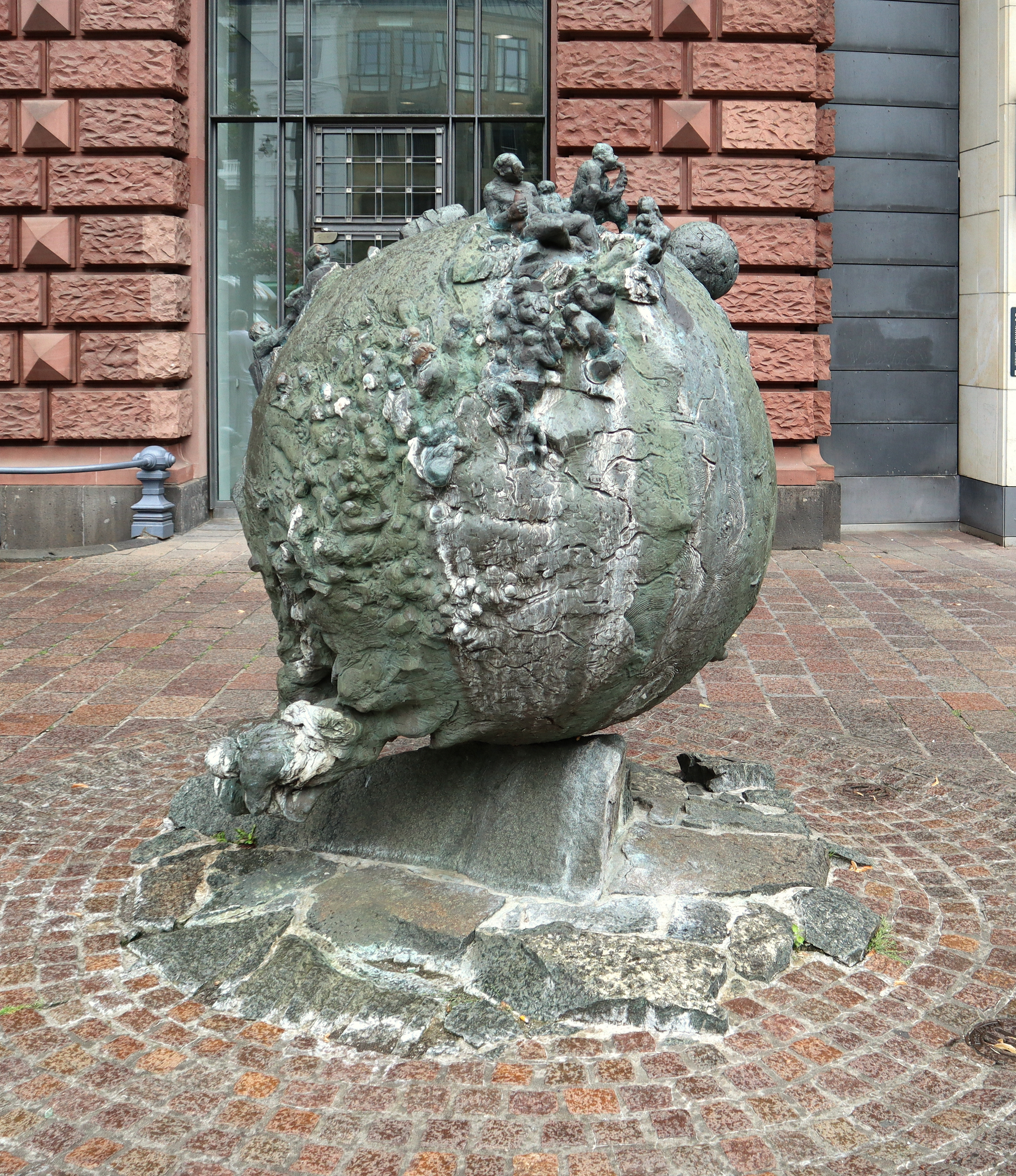
Our Planet

- The trapped, bronze sculpture, Osnabrück c.1974
- The end, bronze sculpture, Bremen 1978
- Development, fountain sculpture in bronze, Bremen 1980
- Waller talks, three bronze half-figures, Bremen 1981
- Man at the desk, bronze sculpture in a courtyard, Göttingen 1984
- Work, inside the main post office building, Bremen 1985
- Citizens, Russian Knoops Park, Burglesum 1987
- The dance ', bronze sculpture, Göttingen 1988
- Four Seasons, bronze, sculptural ensemble in Citizens Park, Bremen 1991
- Convalescents, Bronze, Sculpture in the Park of the Hospital, Bremen 1991
- Jakobsbrunnen group of pilgrims, St. James Church, Augsburg 1994
- Our planet, bronze fountain sculpture on the Domshof, Bremen, 1996
- Fietje bellows, bronze figure, Bremen 2001
