= Kontorhaus am Markt =

Building in Bremen, Germany

Coordinates: 53.075853°N 8.805844°E

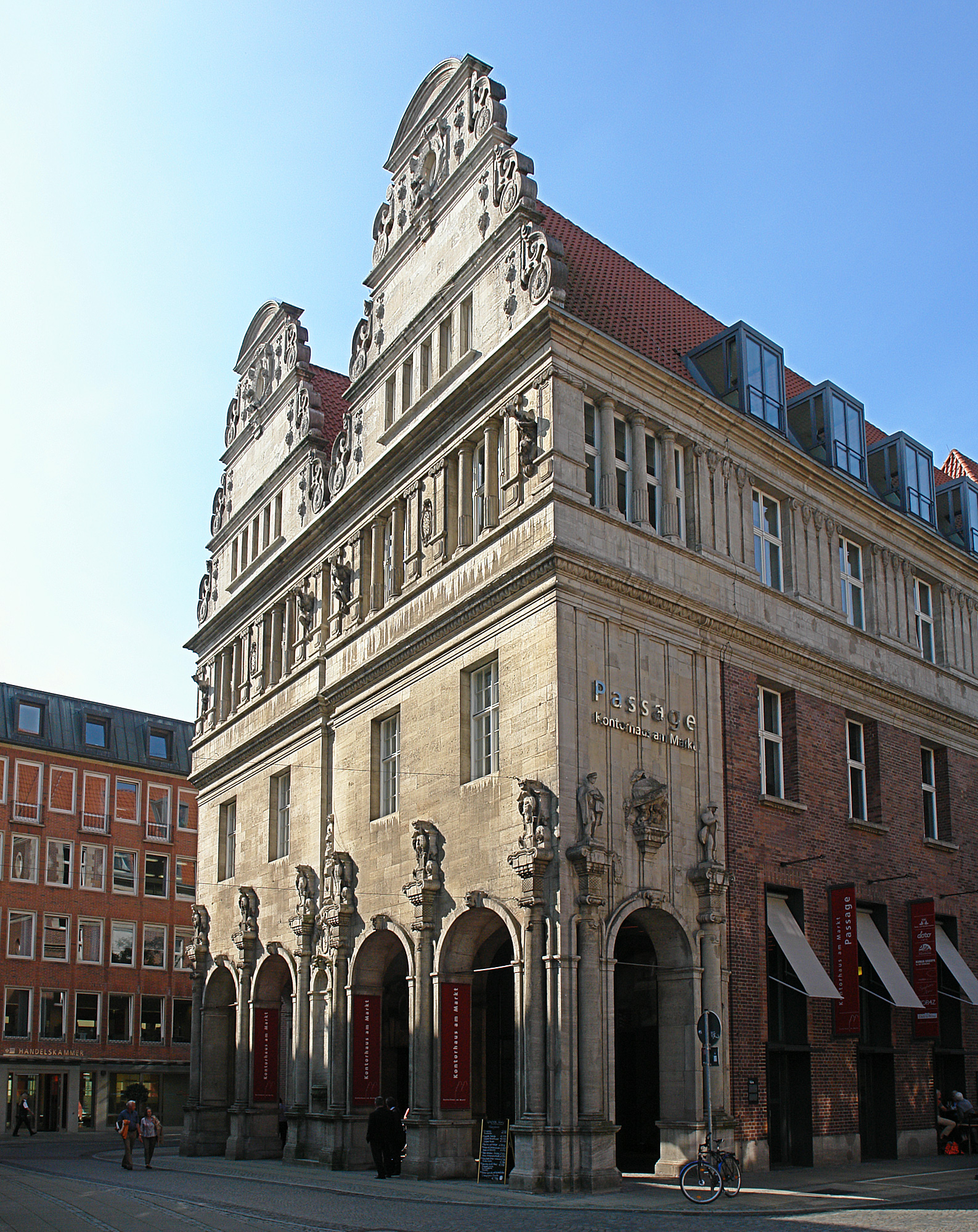
Kontorhaus am Markt

The Kontorhaus am Markt in Bremen is a historical building in the city centre of Bremen. Today, it is used as a shopping mall. It is situated at the Bremer Marktplatz between three streets: Langenstrasse 2/8, Stintbruecke 1 and Bredenstrasse 13.

== History ==
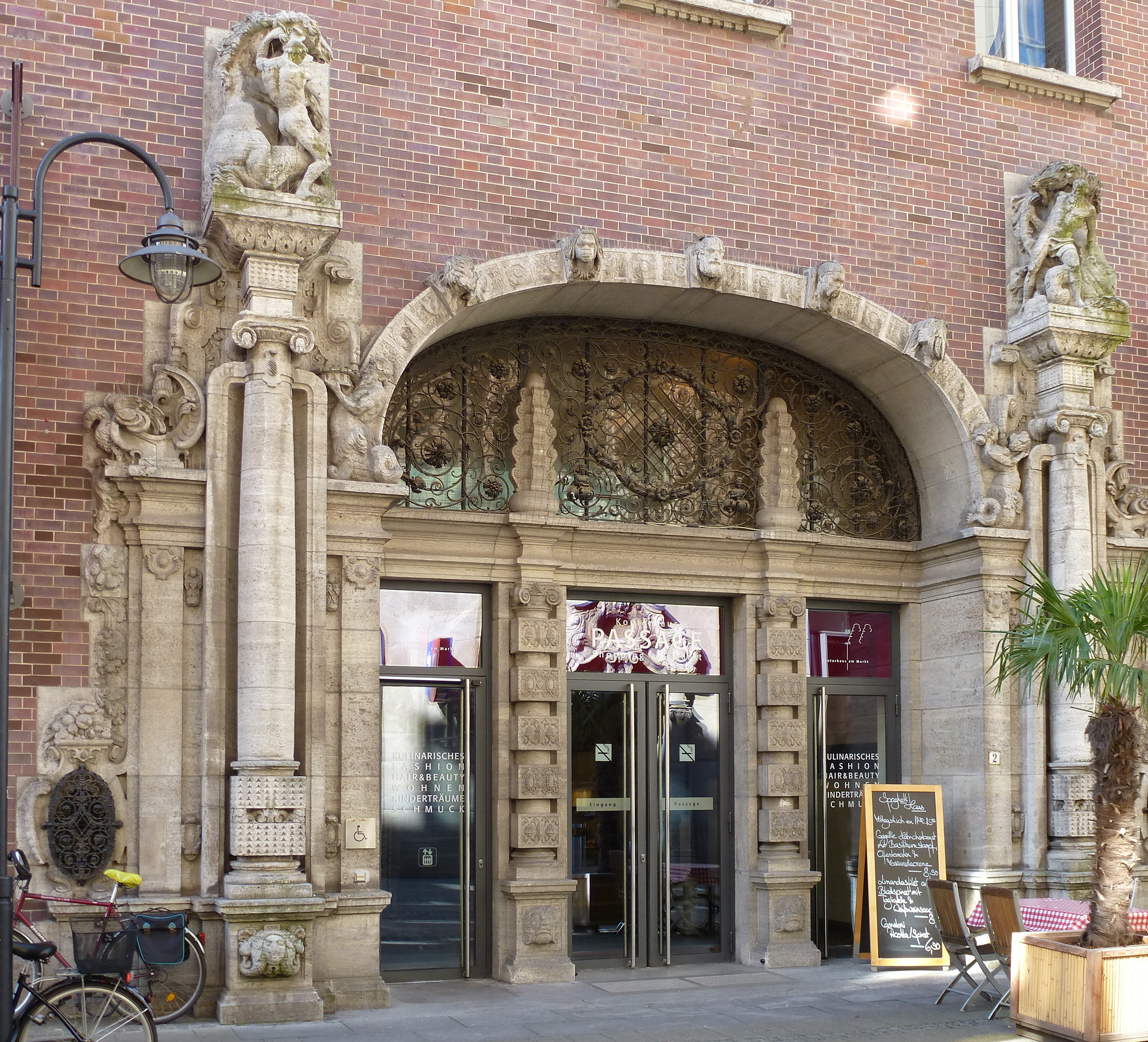
Portal

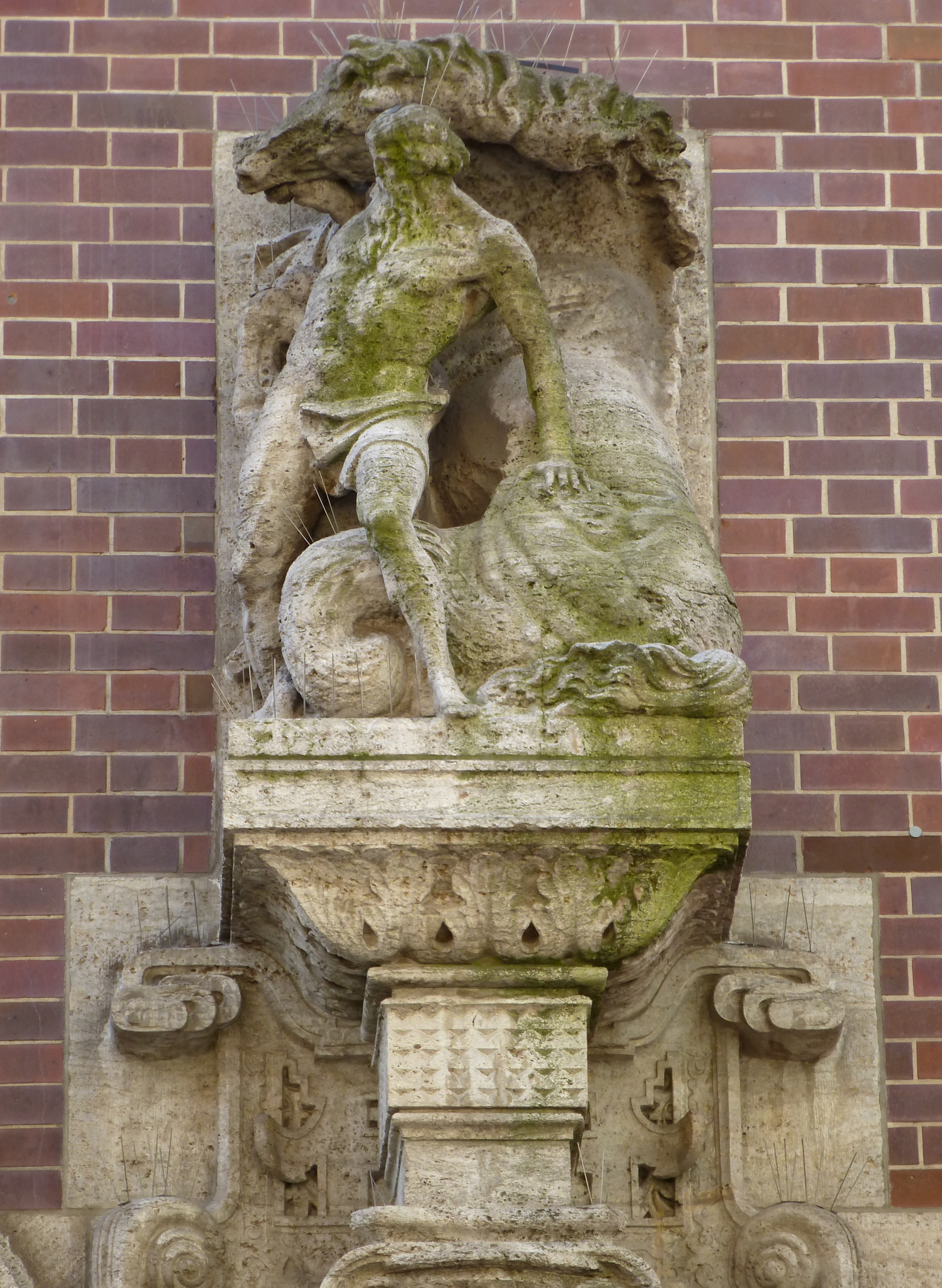
Sculpture at the portal

=== 18th century ===
In the 18th century, the region between Stintbruecke, Wilkenstrasse and south-eastern end of Langenstrasse was covered by a mixed variety of small and medium-sized houses, residential and office buildings, two or three storeys high. The image of Langenstrasse was characterised by old packing and storage houses. The smaller houses with gabled roofs behind the Schütting were pulled down in 1913 when the chamber of commerce building was enlarged. Other buildings were pulled down at the site where the Disconto-Bank was built.

=== New building in 1912 ===
The new group of buildings Langen-/Bredenstraße/Stintbrücke was designed and built between 1910 and 1912 in neo-Renaissance style by the Berlin architectural practice Richard Bielenberg und Josef Moser on behalf of the Disconto Company. Until 1929, this was an important commercial bank with its head office in Berlin and subsidiaries in Bremen, Frankfurt am Main, London and Hamburg. The new buildings were situated in immediate vicinity of the Schütting, a traditional building occupied by the Bremen chamber of commerce. The large building is an example of the development of the city of Bremen in the vicinity of the Markt. It was the endeavour of the senate and its group of experts to protect the historical outline of the region around the Bremer Marktplatz. The architects succeeded in designing a modern office building with a façade decorated with motives of local importance. The impact is created partly by the elaborate use of Muschelkalk freestone in a historicising style.

The three-storey building having magnificent proportions has a double-arched pediment on the market side with an open arcade, arched in Gothic style. On top of the arches, ten sculptures, decoratively patterned, are supported on columns. Originally, the longitudinal building façade at the Langenstrasse was decorated and structured by two dormers which were, however, not preserved. The lower portion of the Langenstrasse façade consists of clinker-bricks. The saddleback roof originally had several dormers which were replaced later on by more modern, higher dormers. The portal being the representative main entrance to the Disconto Bank at the Langenstrasse consists of three sections. It is framed by columns bearing allegoric sculptures.

=== Conversion to office building and shopping mall ===
A major modification of the building was carried out in 1966. Thereafter, the building was used by the Deutsche Telekom as an office. In summer 1999, the building was acquired by the Bremer Investitions-Gesellschaft (BIG). The complex was successively renewed and supplemented according to the design of the architects Manfred Schomers and Rainer Schürmann. The upper storeys are in use, since 2001, as offices and service centres. The main office of the organisation for the promotion of trade and industry (staatliche Wirtschaftsförderung Bremen WFB) is situated here. This organisation, together with the real estate company Justus Grosse which is the owner of the adjacent building, reconverted the spaces on floor and basement level into a shopping mall with food and beverage facilities and a light-flooded inner court.

== Heritage listings ==
Since 1994, the buildings Langenstrasse No. 2 to 18 have been listed as an ensemble as historic monument.
