= Bremen City Hall =

Historical building, instance of Brick Gothic and Weser Renaissance architecture

UNESCO World Heritage Site
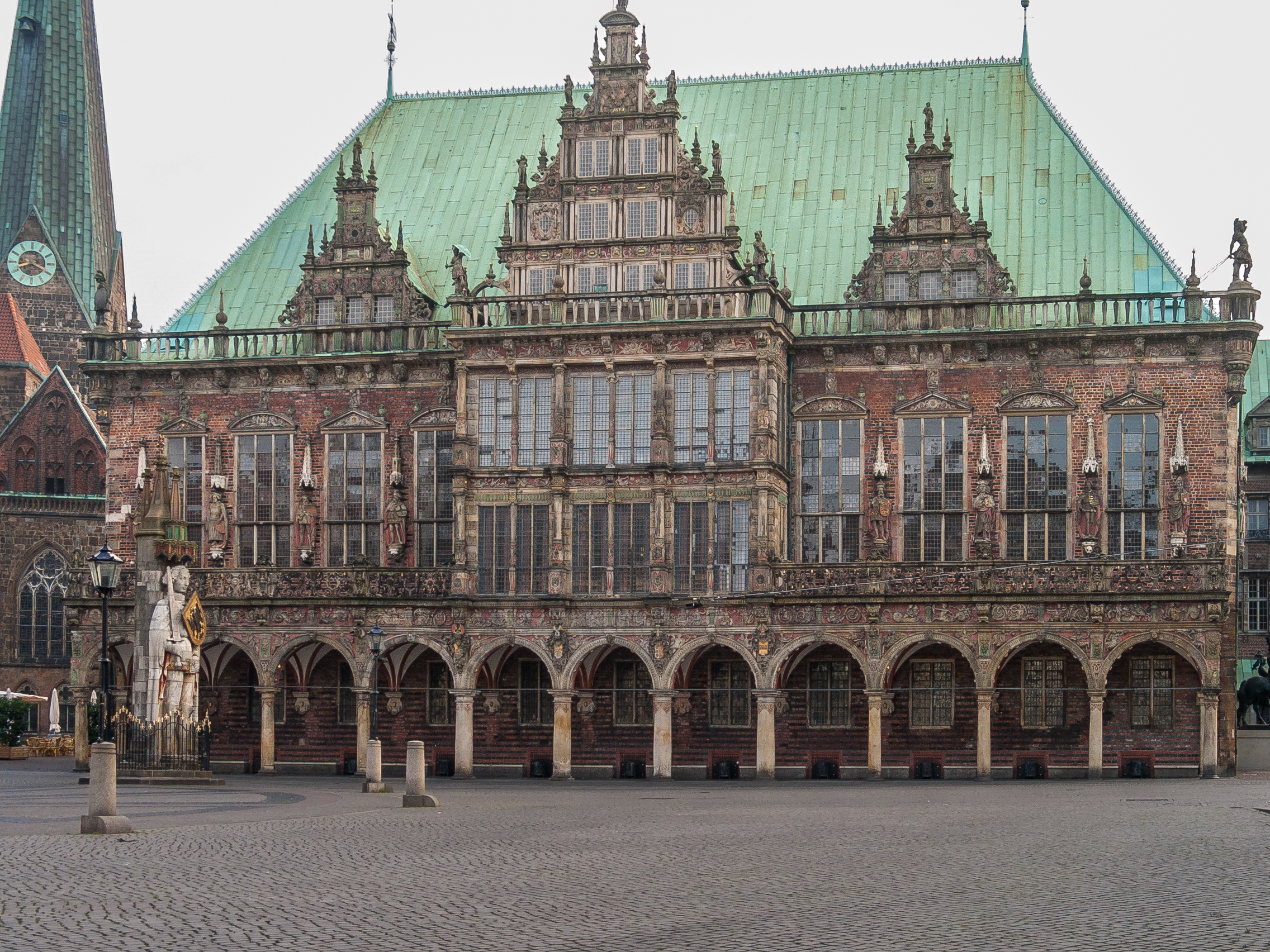
- City hall from the market place, Roland in side view

- Location within Germany
- Official name: Town Hall and Roland on the Marketplace of Bremen
- Location: Bremen, Germany
- Criteria: Cultural: (iii), (iv), (vi)
- Reference: 1087
- Inscription: 2004 (28th Session)
- Area: 0.287 ha (0.00111 sq mi)
- Buffer zone: 376 ha (1.45 sq mi)
- Website: www.rathaus-bremen.de
- Coordinates: 53°4′33.5″N 8°48′26.9″E

Bremen City Hall (German: Bremer Rathaus) is the seat of the President of the Senate and Mayor of Bremen, Germany. It is one of the most important examples of Brick Gothic and Weser Renaissance architecture in Europe. Since 1973, it has been a protected historical building. In July 2004, along with the Bremen Roland statue, the building was added to the list of UNESCO World Heritage Sites because of its outstanding architecture and its testimony to the development of civic autonomy in the Holy Roman Empire.

== Location and description ==
The city hall is on the northeastern side of the market square in the historic city centre. Directly in front of it is the statue of Roland. On the opposite side of that square there is the ancient guildhall, called Schütting, still today the seat of the board of commerce. On the southeastern side of the square is the seat of Bremen state parliament, called the Bürgerschaft. East of both, there is the town hall and parliament, along with the Bremen Cathedral. Near the northern corner of the town hall, there is a sculpture of the Town Musicians of Bremen (by Gerhard Marcks). North of it, there is the Church of Our Dear Lady ("Kirche Unser Lieben Frauen" or short "Liebfrauenkirche").

The old town hall itself, originally constructed in the 15th century, is a rectangular, two-storey hall measuring 41.5 by 15.8 m. The ground floor contains one large hall with oak pillars, historically used for merchants and theatre, and the upper floor contained the main festivity hall.

== History ==
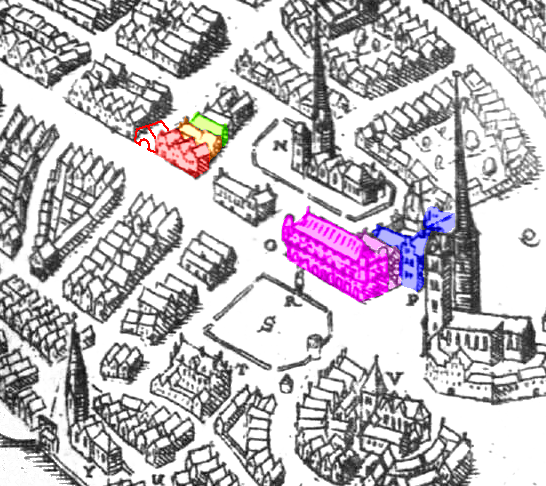
Bremen in 1603: pink = Gothic town hall blue = archbishop's palace red = adaptions or descessors of the ancient town hall red outline = dismantled arch green = descessor buildings of the ancient office yellow = probable other relics or descessors of the ancient town hall group

=== The ancient town hall ===
Bremen's original town hall had been situated in the southern end of the block between Liebfrauenkirchhof ("Our Dear Lady's Churchyard"), Obernstraße ("Highstreet") and Sögestraße ("Pigstreet"). In 1229, it was mentioned as "domus theatralis" ("show house"), and since 1251, it was repeatedly referred to as "domus consularis" ("councilars' house"). An arch across the Sögestraße and a repair by a mason suggest a stone building and, already existing before the arrival of Gothic style, it must have been designed in Romanesque style. It is assumed that before the municipality gained a certain autonomy, the building served as a law court and therefore had at least one open hall, as old Saxon law forbade trials to be held in closed rooms. An exact description is not available, but several documents talk about the cloth shops in that location. They describe the locations of the shops as being "sub" ("below") the town hall. After the construction of the newer town hall, the old town hall was hired out to the grocers' guild, than as a hobs store. Finally in 1598, it was sold to two owners, who converted it to or replaced it with their private houses.

=== The Gothic town hall ===
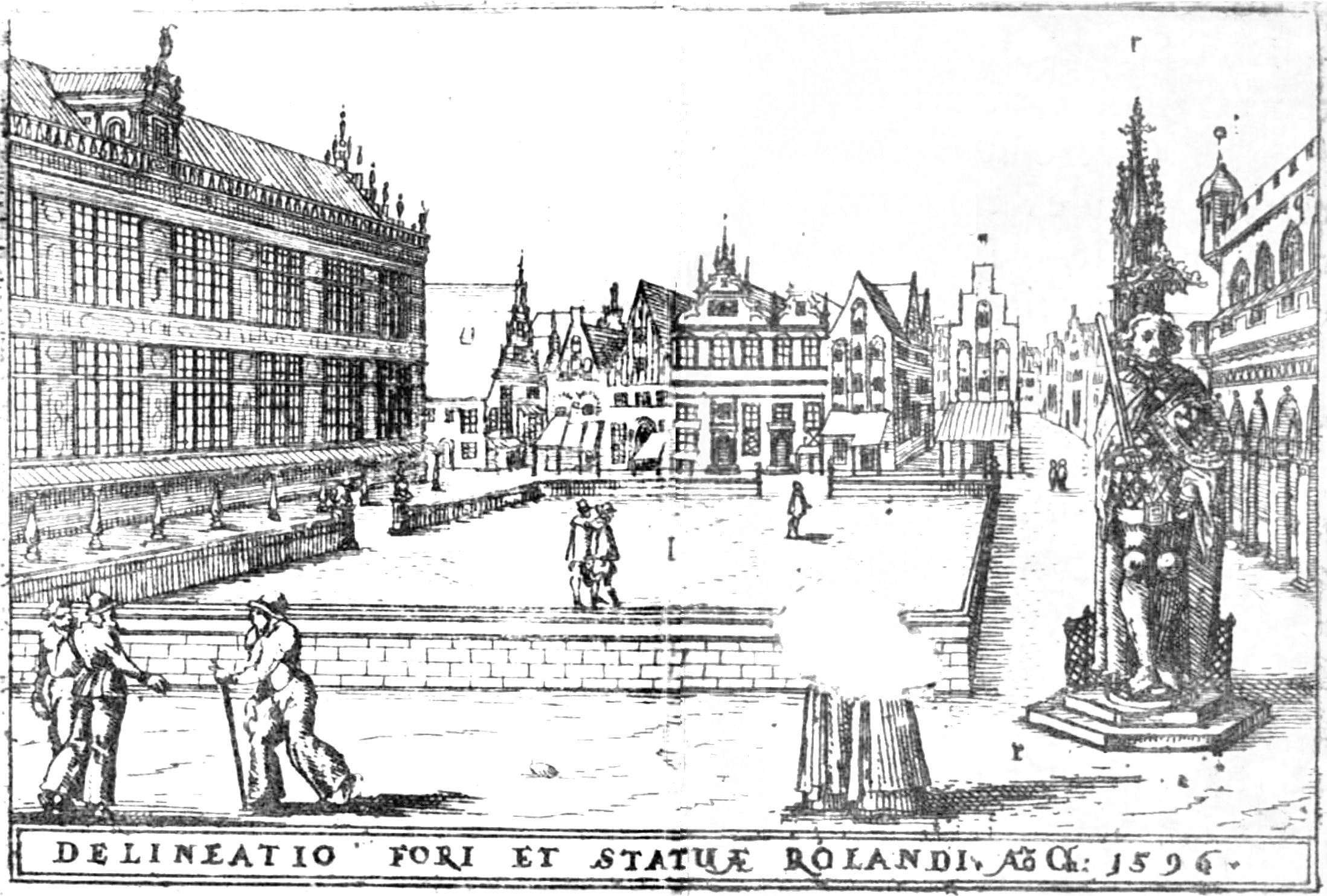
1596, town hall (on the right) still with pointed arch windows

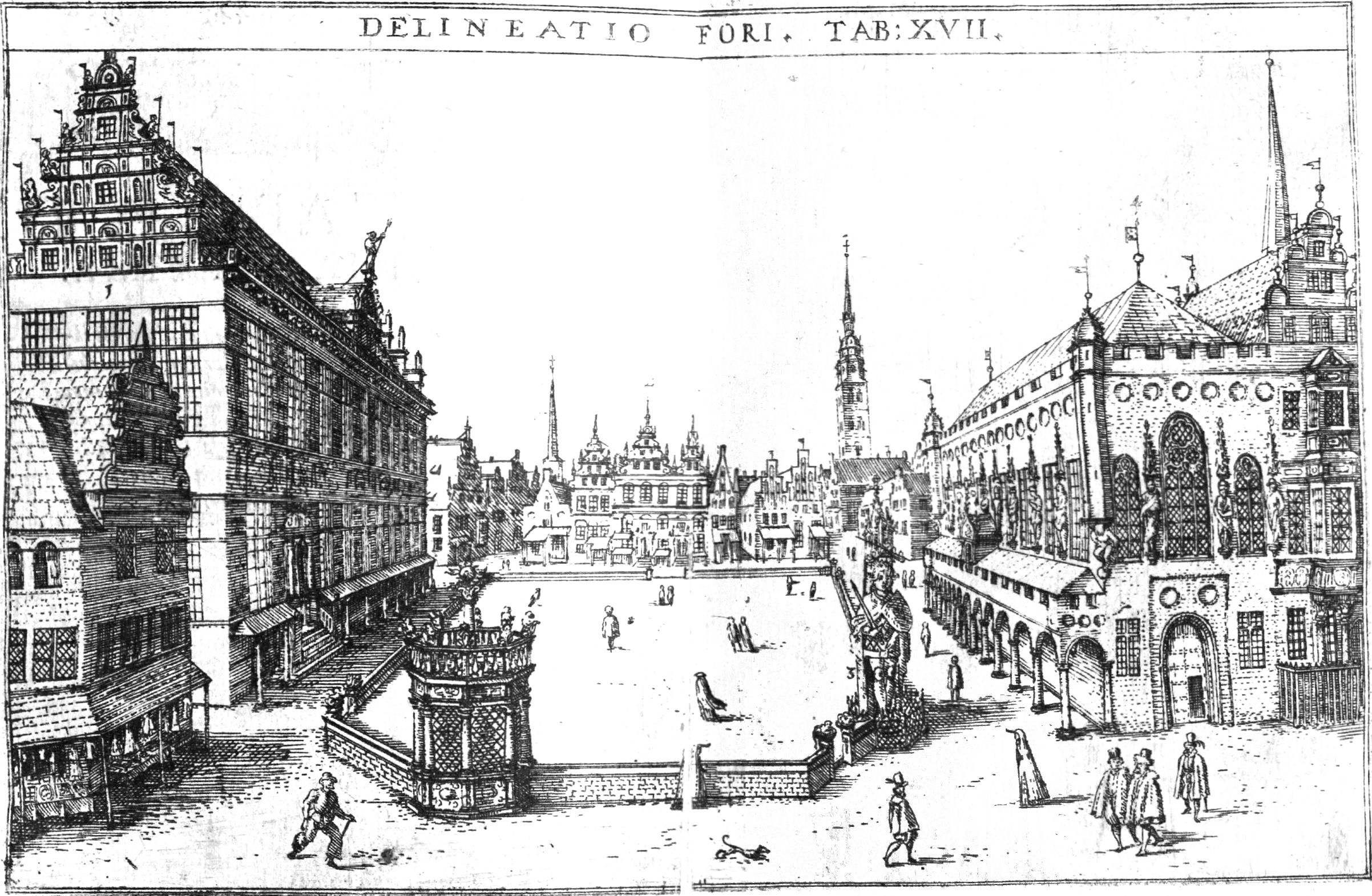
1603, market front with ten large rectangular windows

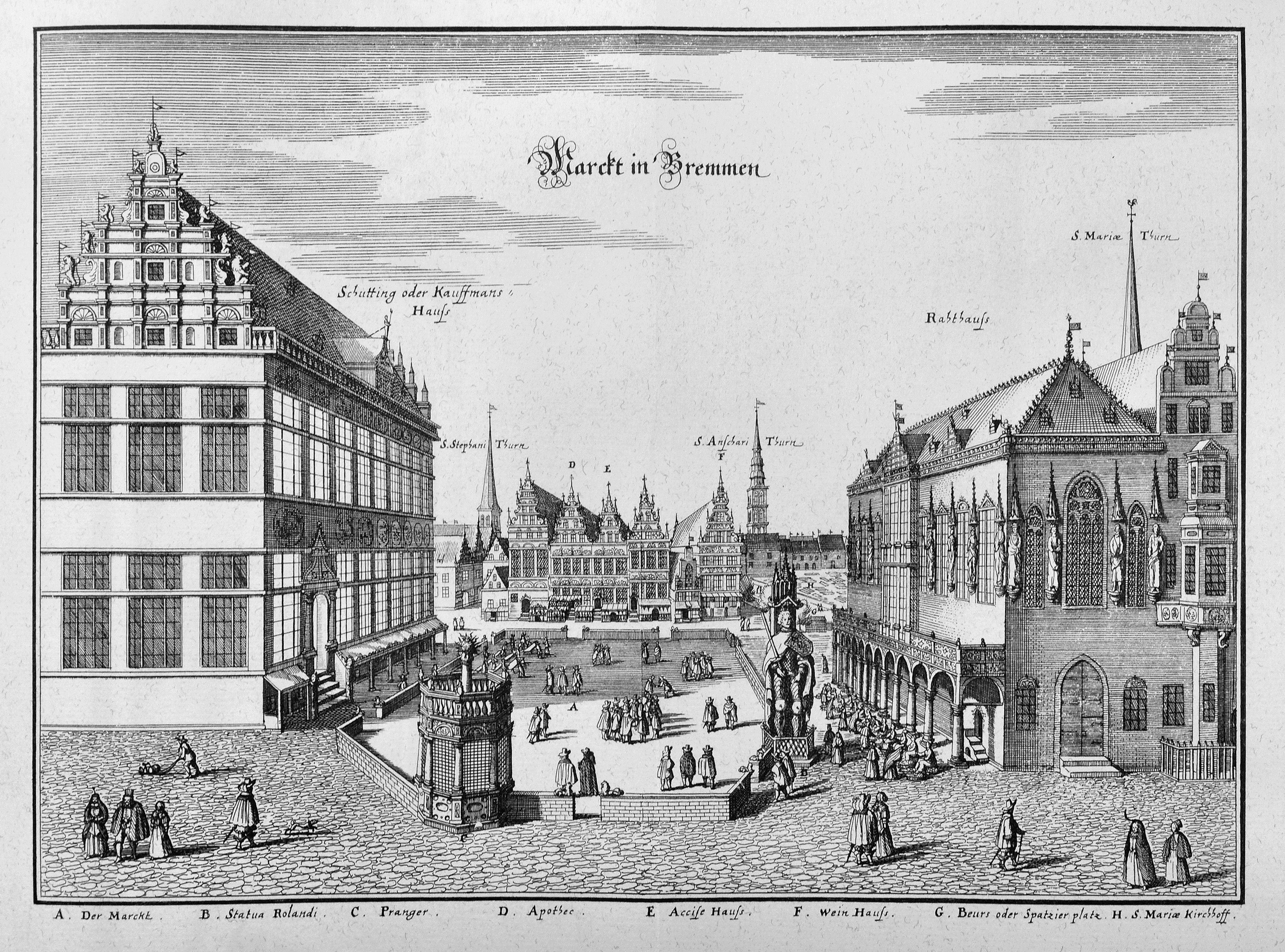
1641, market front with Renaissance gables

In around 1400, when the development of Bremen was at its height, civic leaders commissioned a new town hall. Closely involved in the process were the burgomaster Johann Hemeling and councilmen Friedrich Wagner and Hinrich von der Trupe. The location selected reflected a demonstration of confidence by the council in relation to the archbishop. Bremen Market Square, completed a century before, was to be dominated by the town hall rather than by the cathedral and the archbishop's palace. Both of its two halls, the upper hall and the lower hall, were to be few inches longer and wider than the great hall of the episcopal palace. Construction started in 1405 and the building was completed in 1410.

The first Roland sculpture was completed around the same time as the town hall and was installed in front of the building. It was not yet as large as today.

The town hall was designed in Gothic style and was decorated with 16 large sculptures, showing emperors and prince-electors, demonstrating Bremen's claim of being an imperial city, and four ancient philosophers. But at the same time it was fortified; there were two wall-walks, one above the gallery towards the market square and one all around the gutters of the hip-roof. Four small towers with staircases provided access from the upper hall to the upper wall-walk. The gallery on ground level towards the market square was not intended to shelter merchants; rather it was reserved for trials. The Ratskeller was established below the halls.

=== Renaissance ===
From 1545 to 1550, an extension with three floors was built between the town hall and the archbishop's palace, showing a Renaissance style gable facing eastward towards the cathedral. At the end of the century, Bremen lived through its second boom, and a great relaunch of the town hall took place. The main artist was the architect and mason Lüder von Bentheim. The modernization took place in two steps: in the first step, from 1595 to 1596, the ten windows of the upper hall facing towards the market square were converted from pointed arches to large rectangular windows. About twelve years later, from 1608 to 1612, a great transformation to Weser Renaissance was started: the two middling windows and the proclamation door between them were displaced by a huge avant-corps, consisting of slim pillars and columns and large windows. On top, a decorated gable in Flemish Renaissance style was erected, and two similar gables beside. Reliefs were used to decorate the facade. The many architectural elements were based on work by the masters of the Dutch Renaissance, such as Hans Vredeman de Vries, Hendrik Goltzius and Jacob Floris.

=== Baroque ===
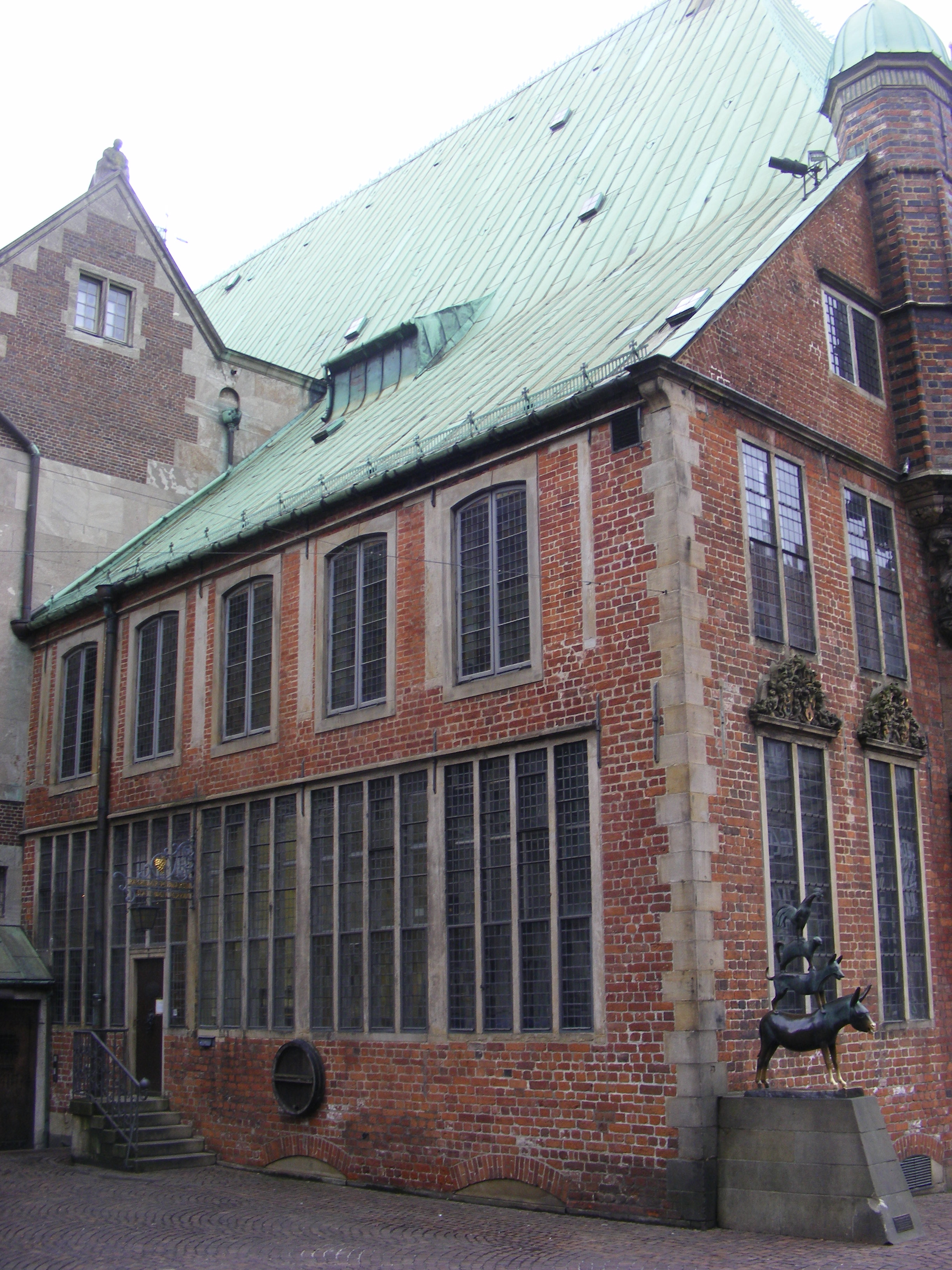
Office of 1682/83 and the Musicians of Bremen

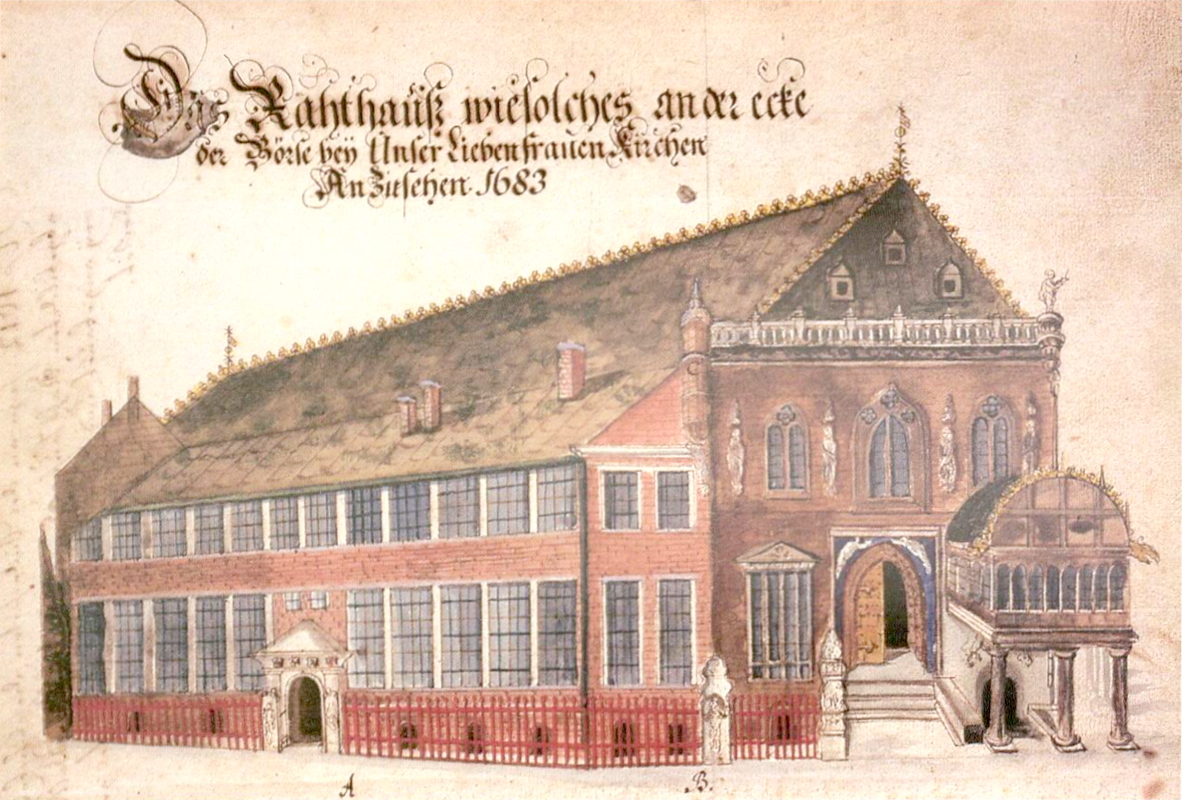
Rear side in 1683

Soon after the completion of those works, Germany was ravaged by the Thirty Years' War, and after the Peace of Westphalia, Bremen had to defend itself against the Swedish invasion. In 1682/83, the office on the rear side was enlarged in a form of Baroque style – with horizontal rows of windows that did not become common until two centuries later.

=== 19th century ===
With the German mediatisation in 1803, the neighbouring archbishop's palace, that had been extraterritorial, became a municipal property. Provisionally, it was used for offices. In 1818/19, it was partly dismantled and rebuilt as the Neoclassical "Stadthaus" (municipal office building). In 1826, dangerous damage to the town hall and its extensions was detected. With the repairs, the appearance of the market front was conserved, but the eastern Renaissance façade was replaced by a simple one and the rear side lost its unique design.

=== 20th century ===
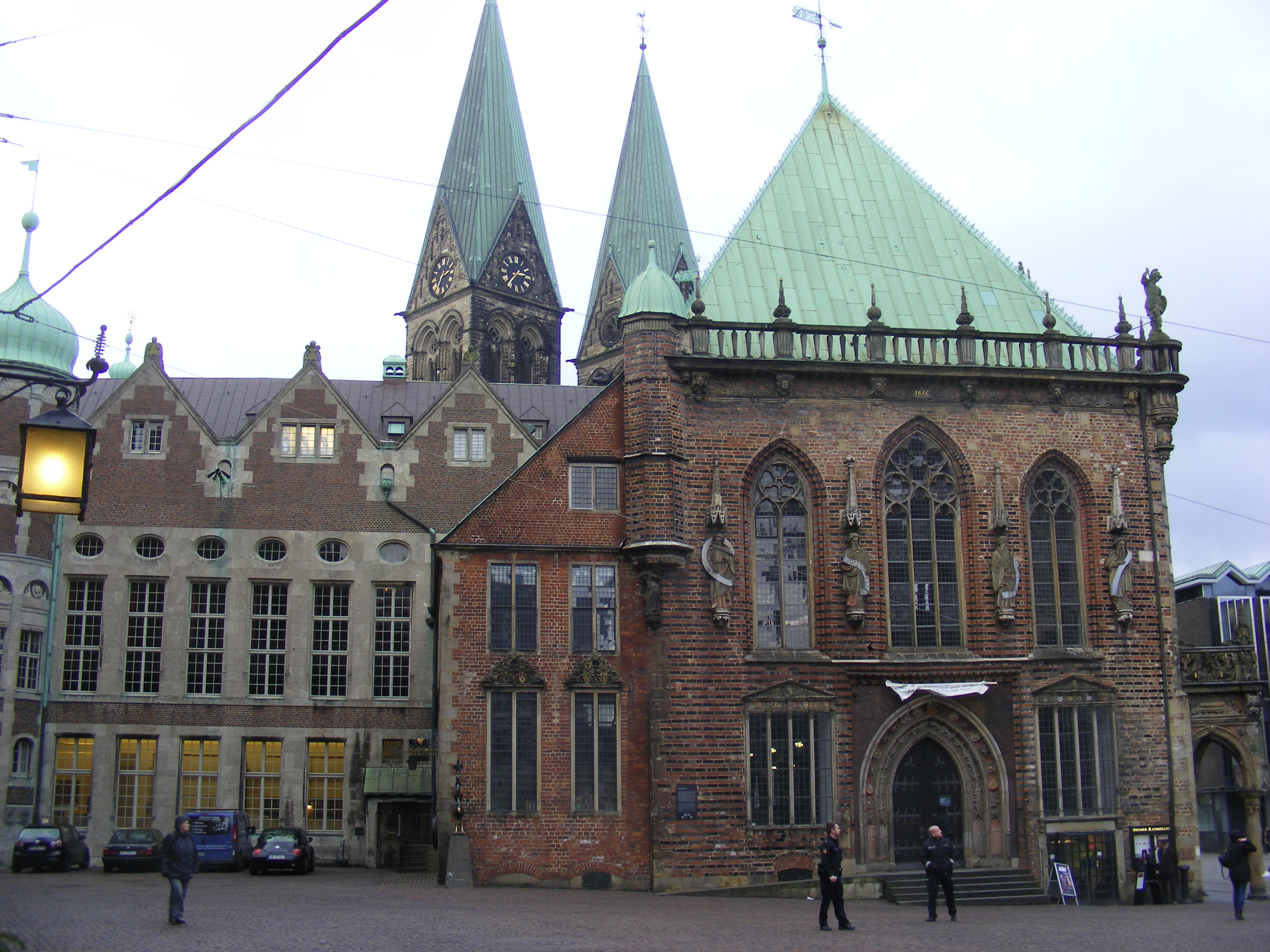
Gothic, Renaissance, Baroque and Art Nouveau parts from northwest

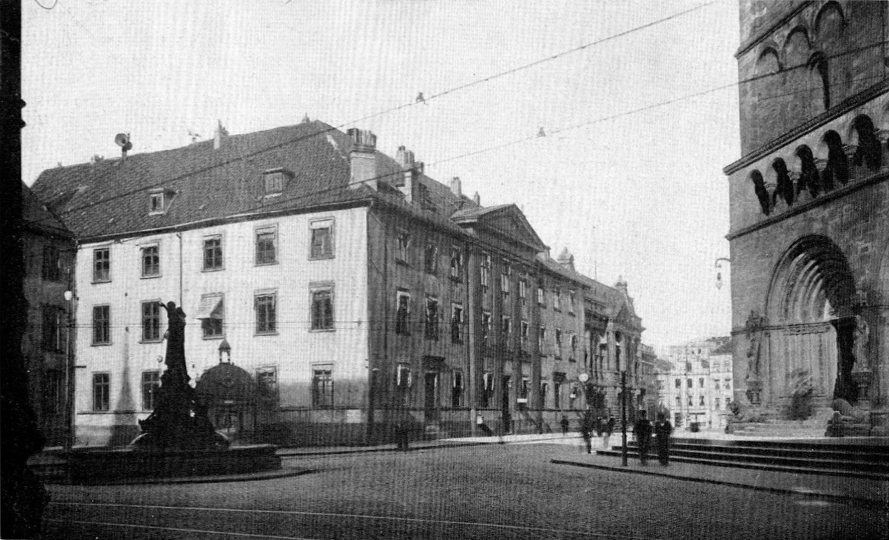
The Stadthaus in 1900

From 1820 to 1900, the population of Bremen grew significantly, and, in the early 20th century Wilhelminism preferred abundant representation. Therefore, an enlargement of the town hall was planned. In 1909, the Stadthaus was dismantled to build an extension on its site. During that work, many Gothic artifacts were found, significantly more than historians expected. With the Neues Rathaus (New Town Hall), the town hall benefited from an extension about twice as large as the old building. The new building was designed by the Munich architect Gabriel von Seidl and completed in 1913.

== Gallery ==
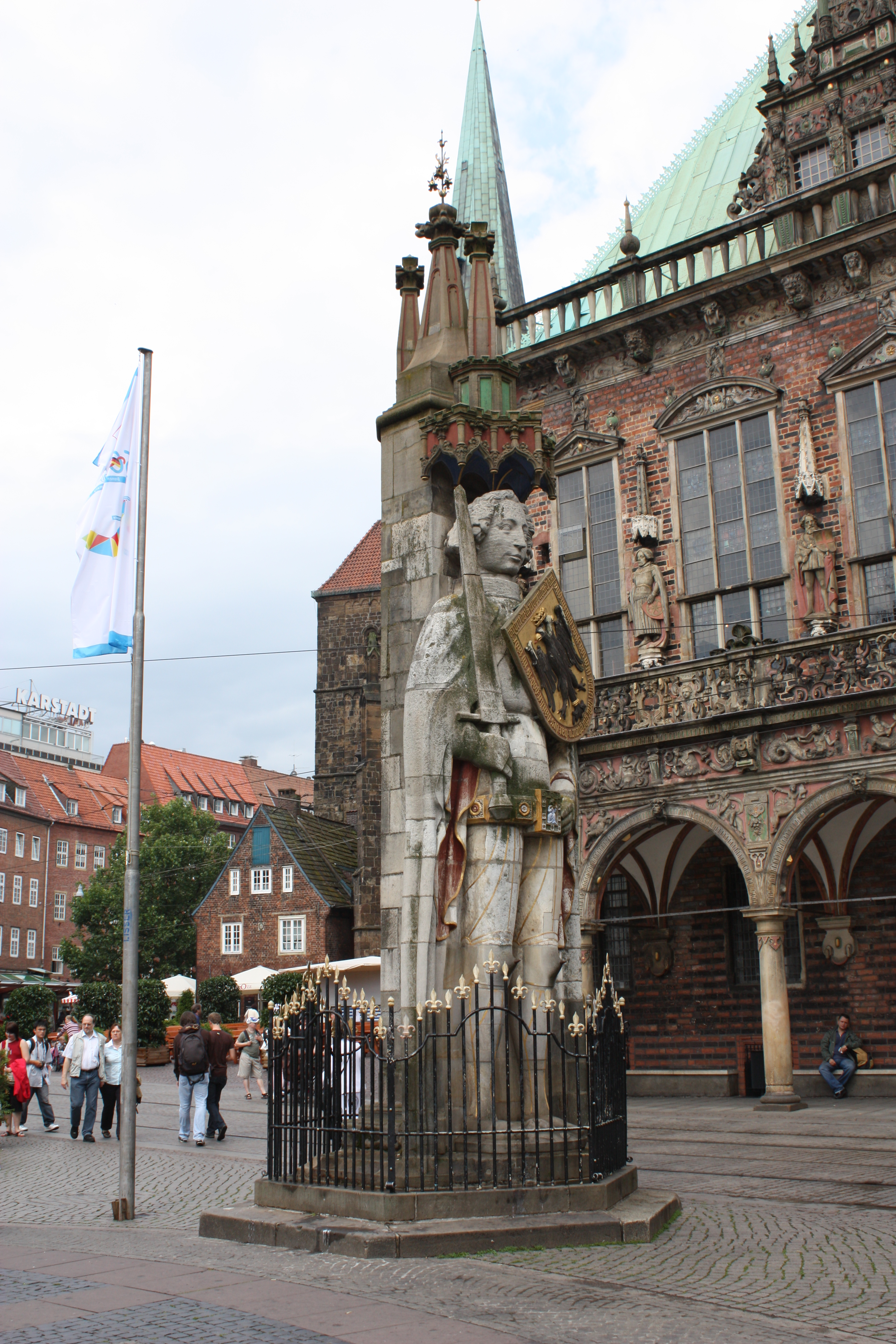
Roland sculpture

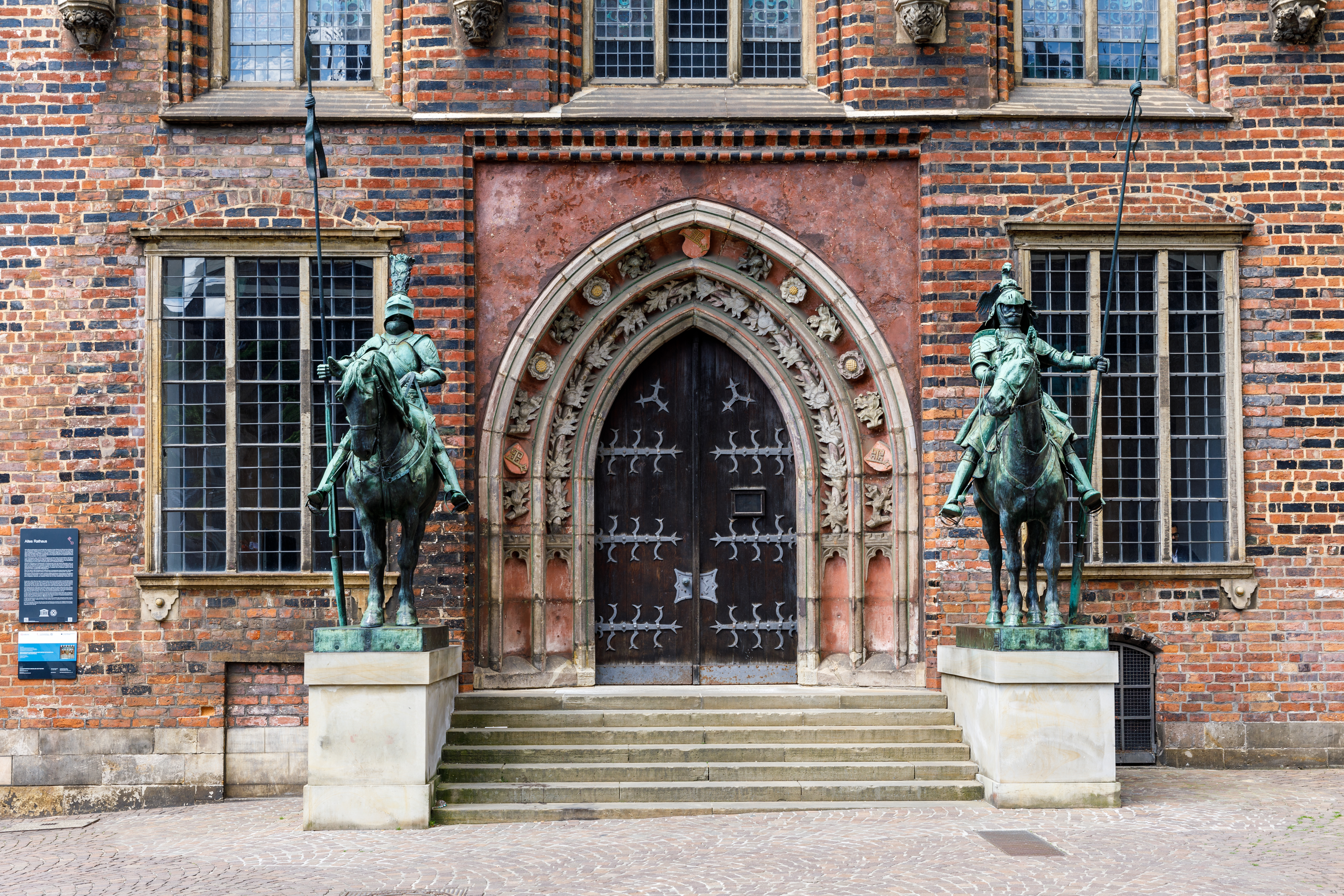
Heralds at the south-east side

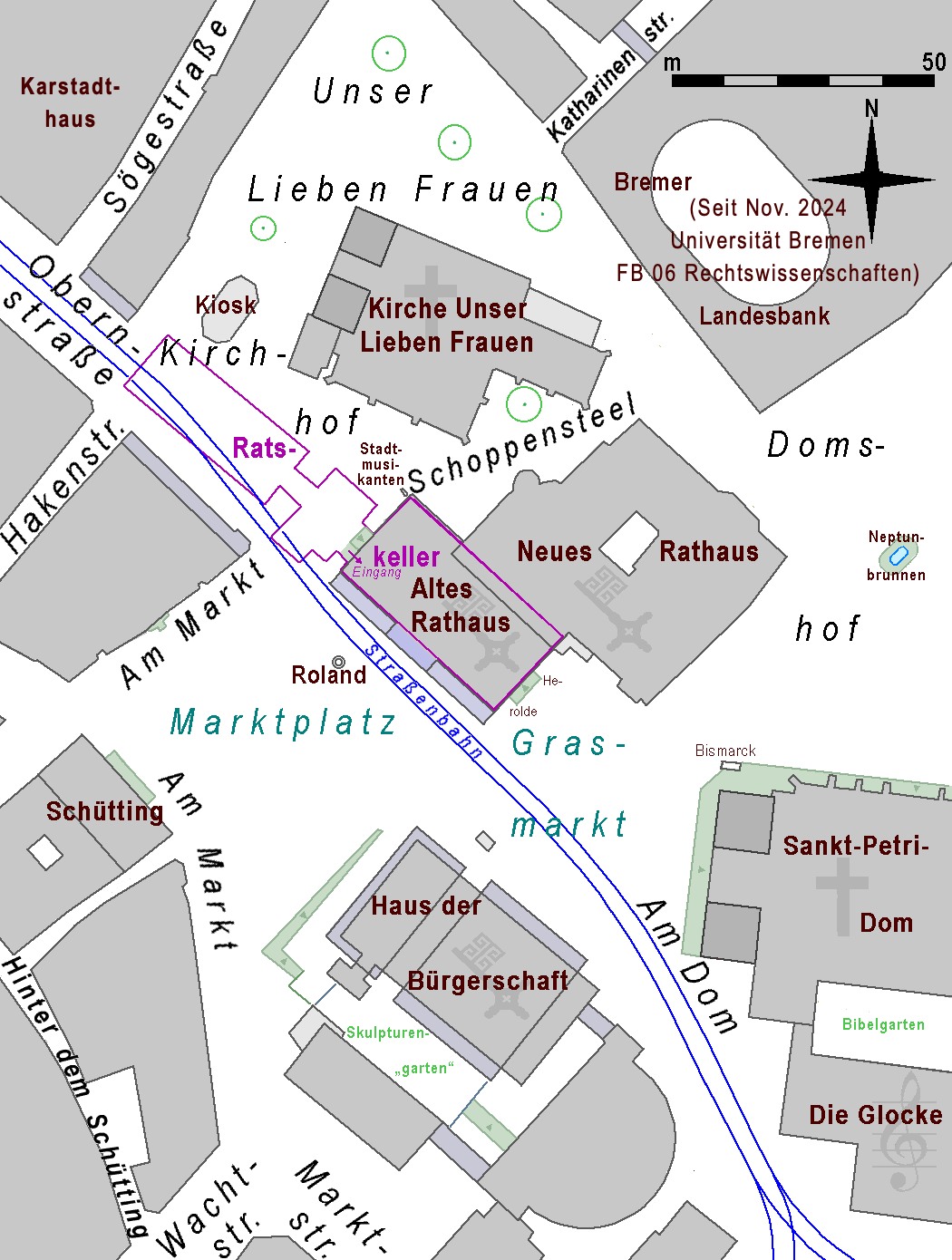
Neighbourhood of Bremen's town hall

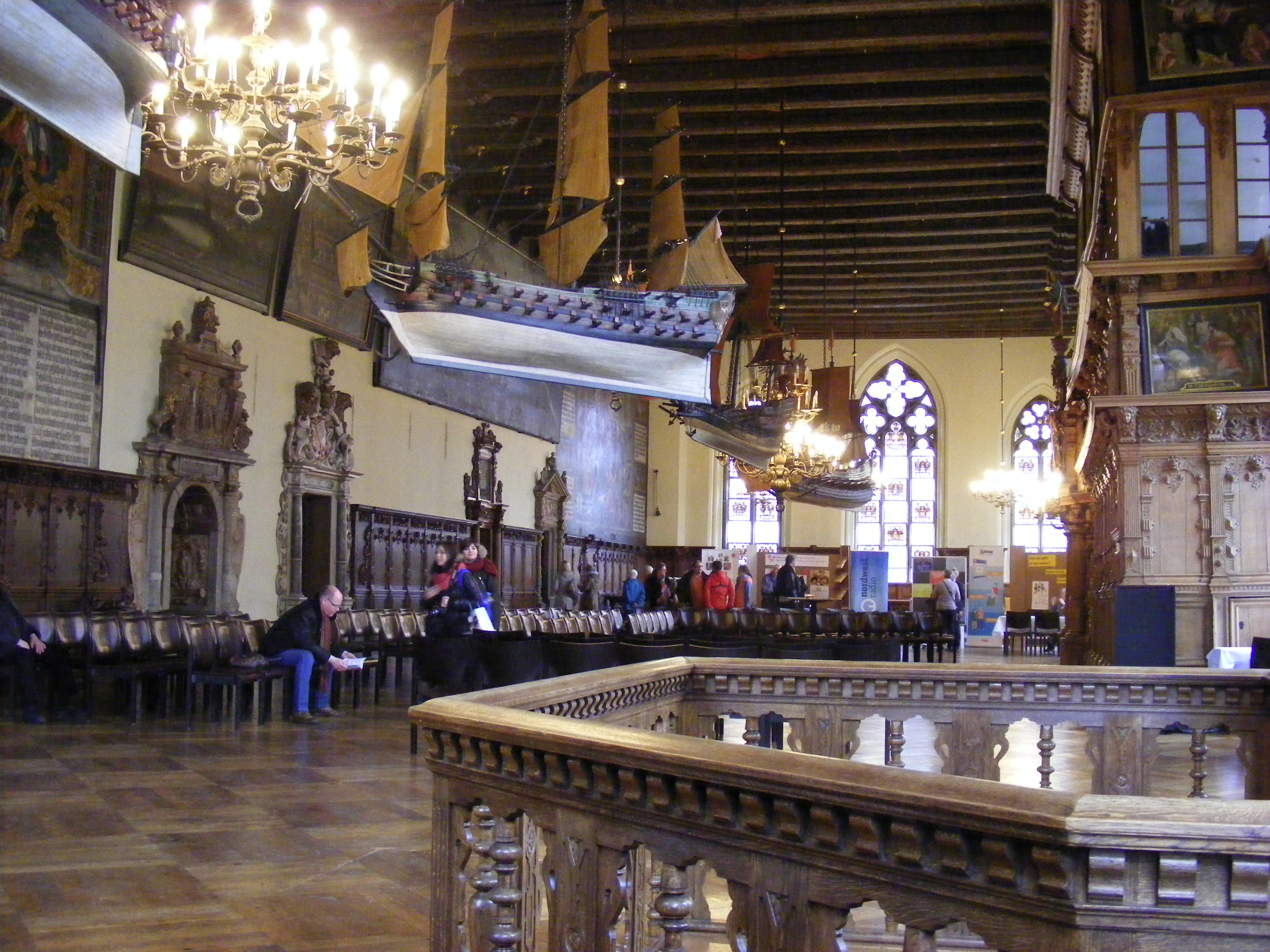
Upper Hall

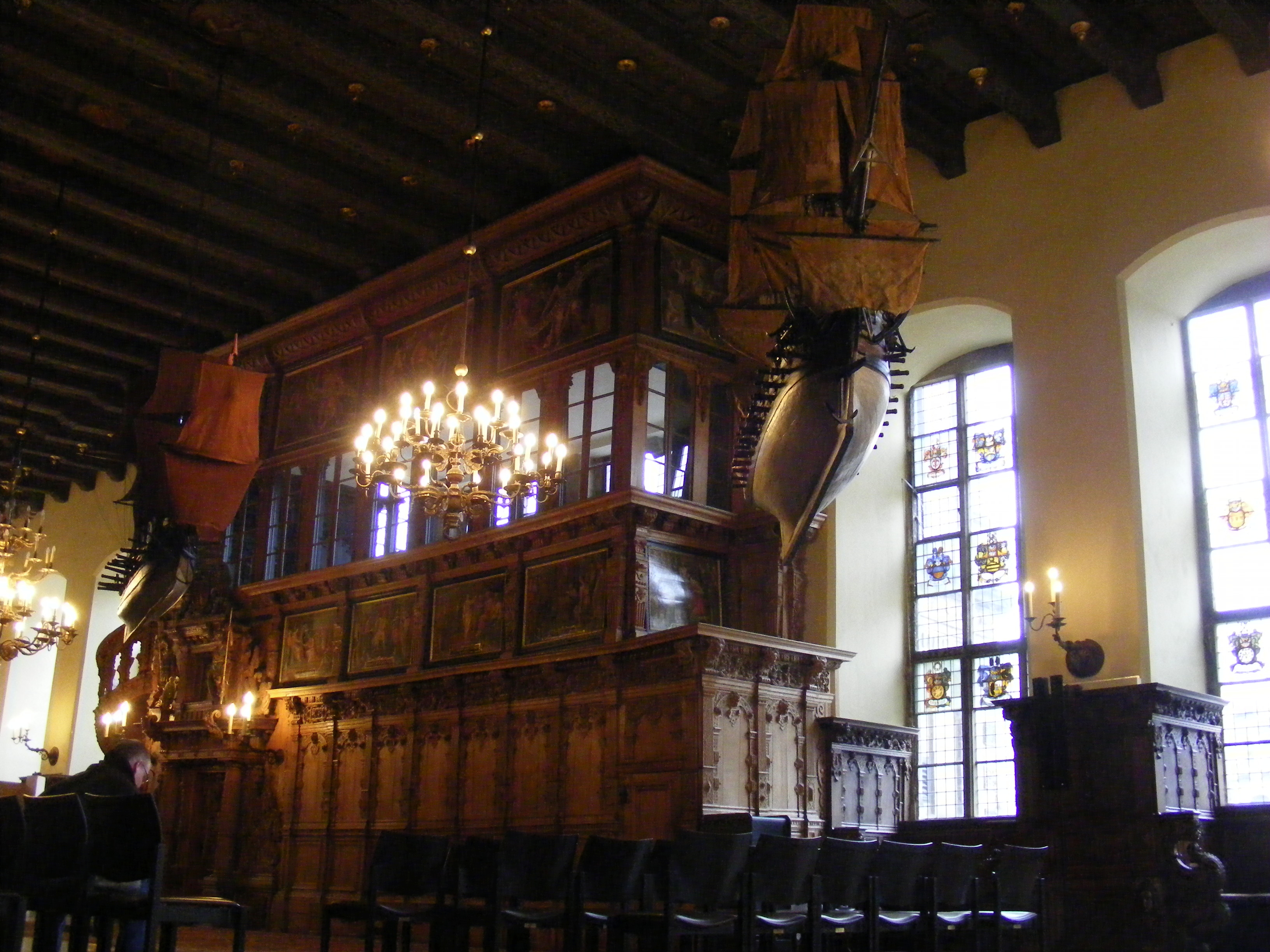
Upper Hall with former archive (upstairs) and Güldenkammer

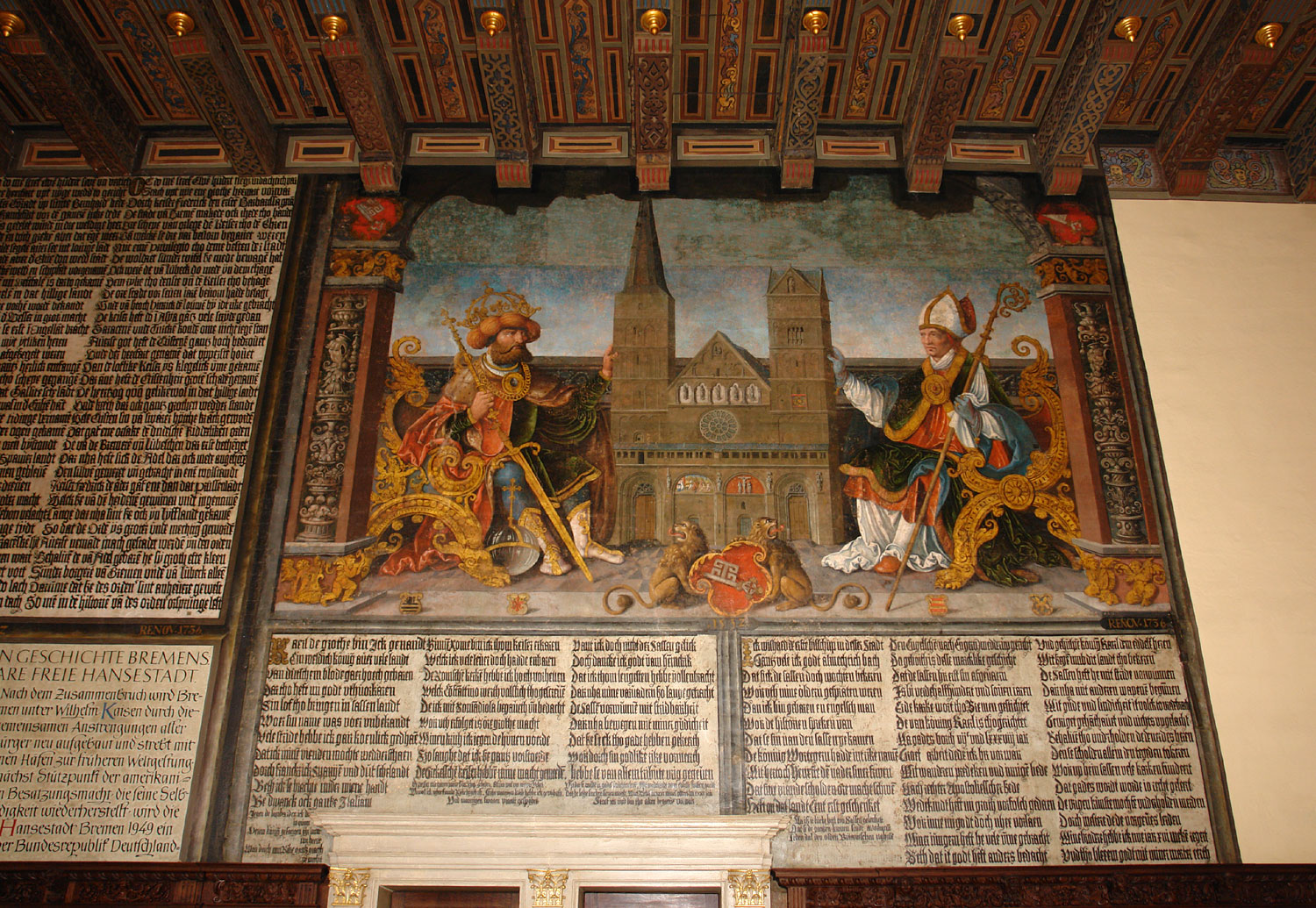
Upper Hall, "Charlemagne and bishop Ansgar", painted in 1532

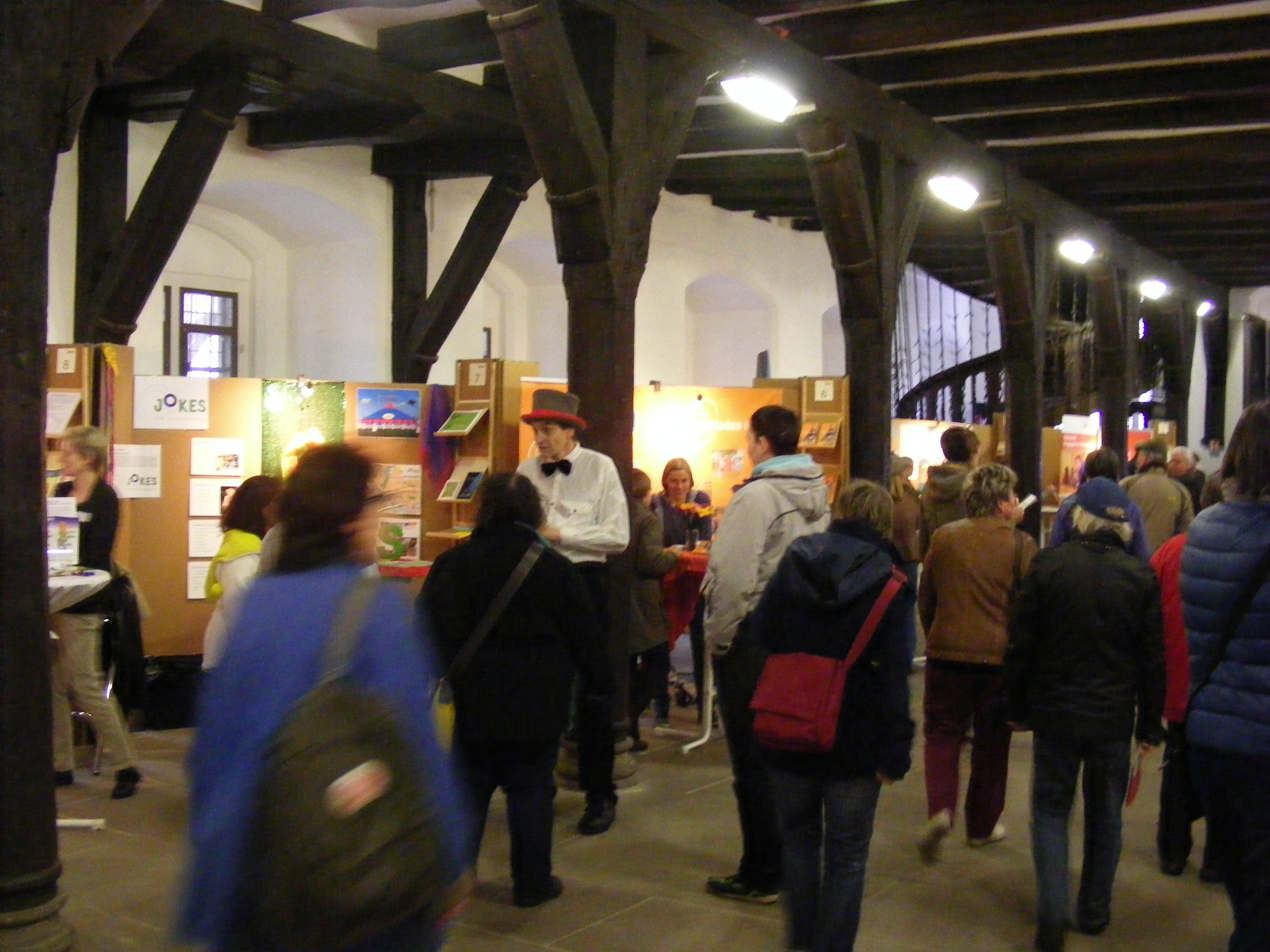
Lower Hall

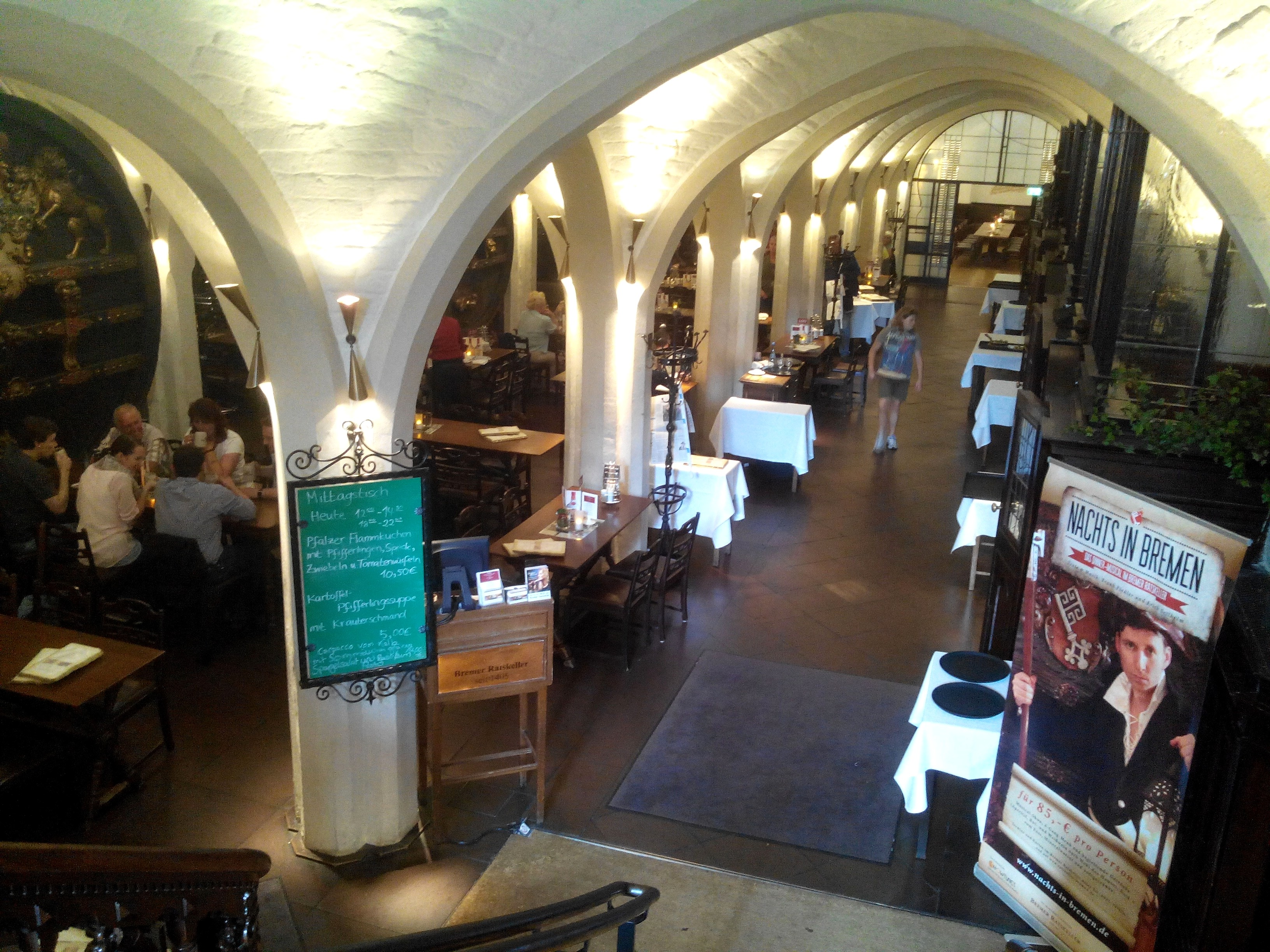
Ratskeller

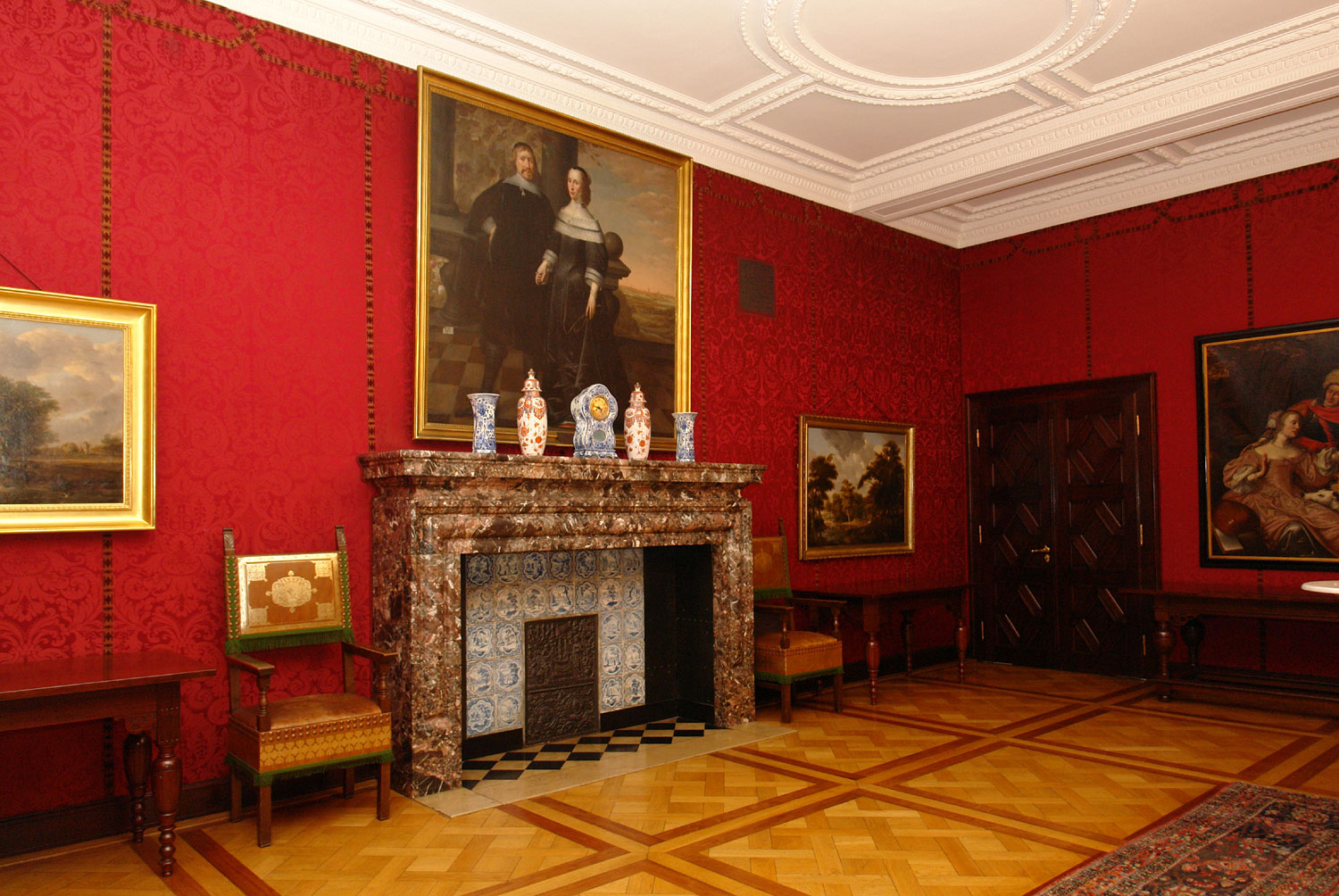
Fireplace in the New Town Hall
