= Freimarkt =

Volksfest in Bremen, Germany

Coordinates: 53°05′14″N 8°48′48″E

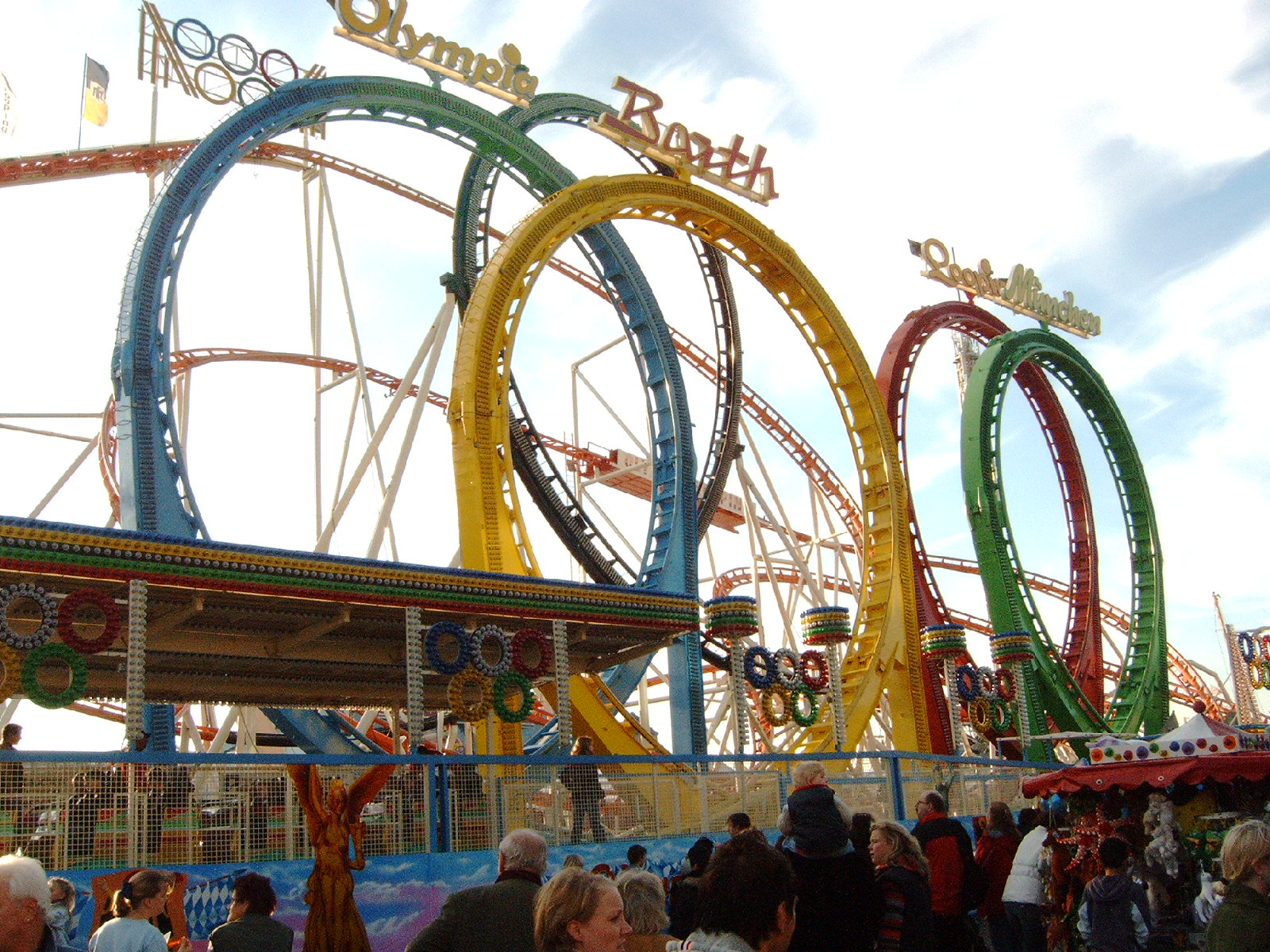
Roller coaster at Bremen Freimarkt, 2002

Freimarkt (lit. Free Fair) in Bremen, Germany, first held in 1035, is one of the oldest fairs in Germany. With more than four million visitors each year, it is also considered to be the biggest funfairs in Northern Germany.

It is celebrated for 17 days in the last two weeks of October, somewhat extended from Friday to Sunday. The area covers approximately 100,000 square meters on two areas: the so-called "Kleiner Freimarkt" (lit. Small Free Fair) on the market square, and the main area at the Bürgerweide adjacent to the Main Station and the Exhibition Center.

The highlight is the "Freimarktsumzug" (lit. Free Fair Procession) held on the second Saturday of the festival. The traditional exclamation for the Freimarkt days, which is also referred to as the "fifth season", is: "Ischa Freimaak!", which can be translated as "It's Freimarkt!".

== History ==
On 16 October 1035 Emperor Conrad II gave the "fair justice" to the city of Bremen. In the first centuries it was a free market for one day on 9 October. A showman with a carousel appeared for the first time in 1809.

== Chronology ==
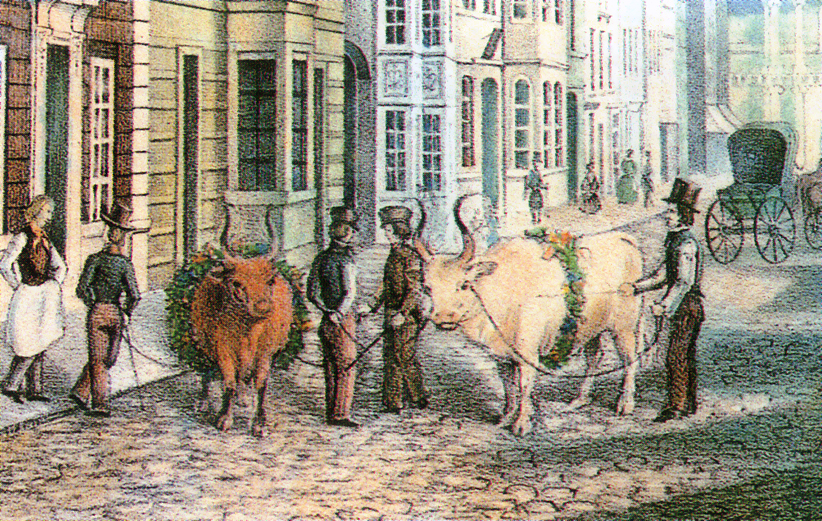
Procession in the year 1845

=== 1035 ===
Emperor Conrad II grants the right to hold a fair to Archbishop Bezelin

=== 1404 ===
The Roland, the stone landmark of the city of Bremen, is erected.

=== 1450/1489 ===
The so-called ‚Kundigen Rullen' granted by the city, limited the Freimarkt for all time to the period when ‚de banere up den markede styet', i.e. the special flag was hoisted to display the agreed market peace

== 17th century ==
The monastery’s oxen were used in a procession and two of them were sold in an auction for charity. This custom endured until 1896.

=== From 1700 to 1814 ===
The fair began on 18 October every year

=== 1793 ===
Franz II is the last German Emperor who grants the Bremen merchants the right for the Freimarkt - as of this time, they decide themselves when they want to celebrate.

=== from 1800 ===
With the Enlightenment, which freed life and customs of traditional formality, and the introduction of carousels and swings, the selling market transforms into an entertainment market.

=== 1809 ===
The first carousel turns on the Freimarkt - Operator: the restaurant owner, Wilhelm Pohlmann

=== from 1830 ===
The Bremer Freimarkt develops into an attractive event far beyond the borders of Bremen. The city has to turn away market operators for the first time due to insufficient space.

=== from 1860 ===
The market develops further on account of technology e.g. illumination: 1862 oil lamps are replaced by petroleum lamps, these then by gas lamps as of 1880, and four years later by electric lamps. The railway connects Vegesack, Bremerhaven, Oldenburg, Hannover and Hamburg.

=== 1936 ===
The Freimarkt, which had taken place at differing locations (Grünenkamp, Domshof, Hohenstorsplatz), gets a fixed location in the heart of Bremen: on the Bürgerweide.

=== 1967 ===
A procession on the second Saturday was organized. In this event some thousand people take part every year, forming more than 100 groups (for example marching bands). The procession passes the city hall, and in the afternoon the most beautiful, most unusual and imaginative groups get awards. Since the end of the 20th century the procession starts in the "Neustadt" (new city) of Bremen.
