= Bremer Marktplatz =

Square in Bremen, Germany

Coordinates: 53°4′32″N 8°48′25″E

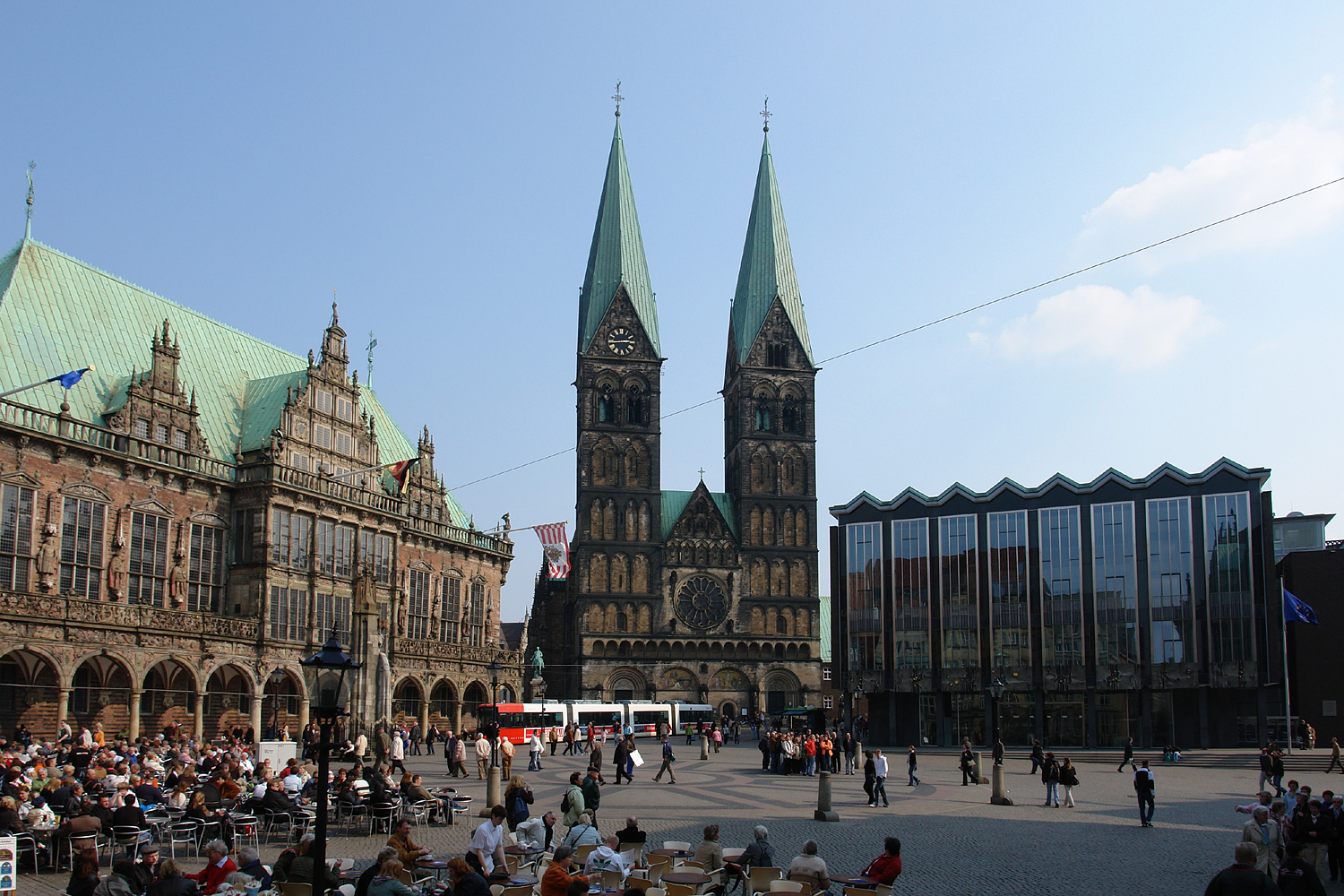
Market square with town hall, cathedral and parliament building

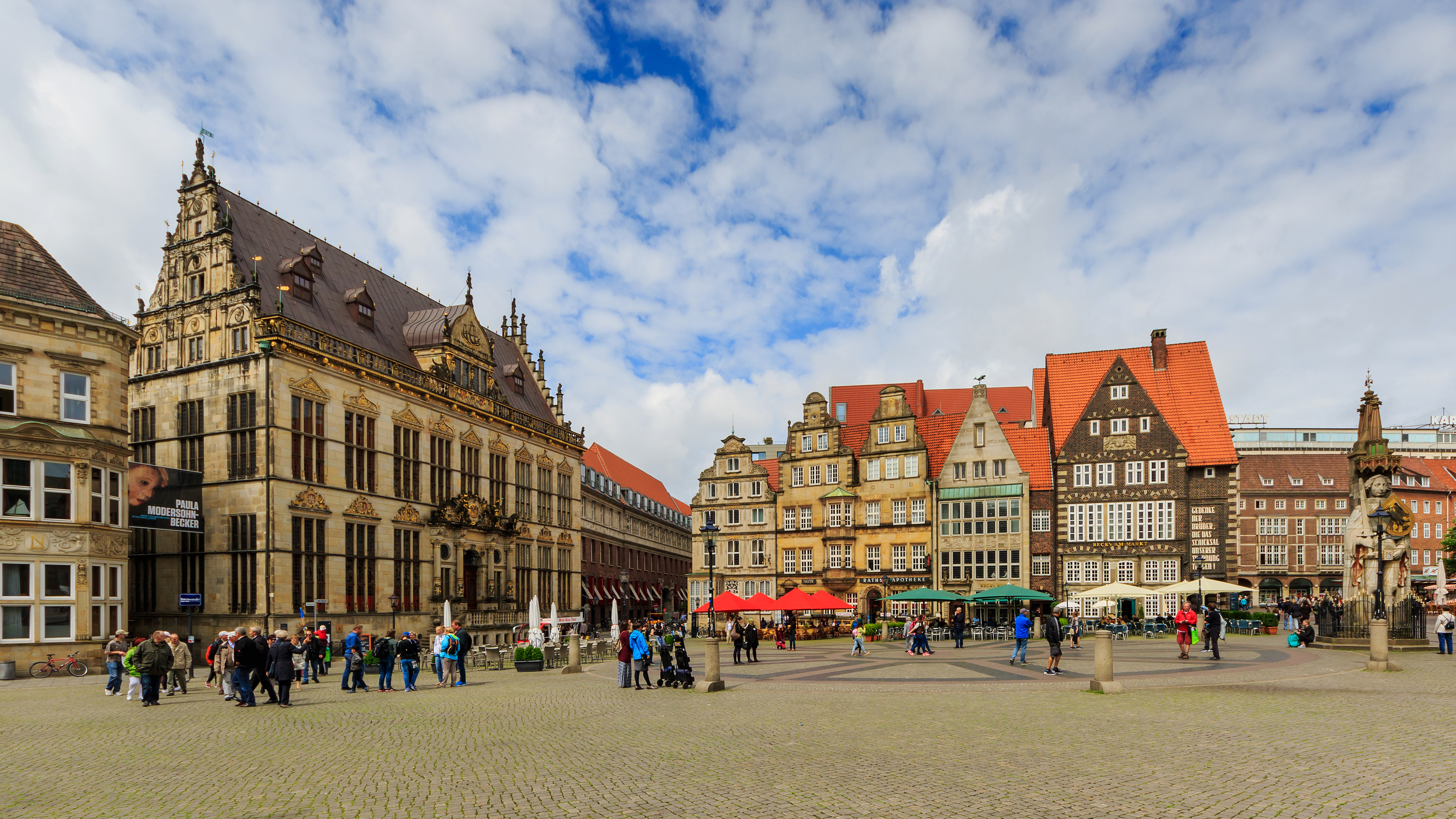
Opposite view of the market square: Schütting and western side

The Bremer Marktplatz (Bremen Market Square) is a square situated in the centre of the Hanseatic City of Bremen. One of the oldest public squares in the city, it covers an area of 3,484 m^{2} (37,500 sq ft). It is no longer used as a market place except for the Christmas market and the annual Freimarkt Fair at the end of October.

== History and development ==
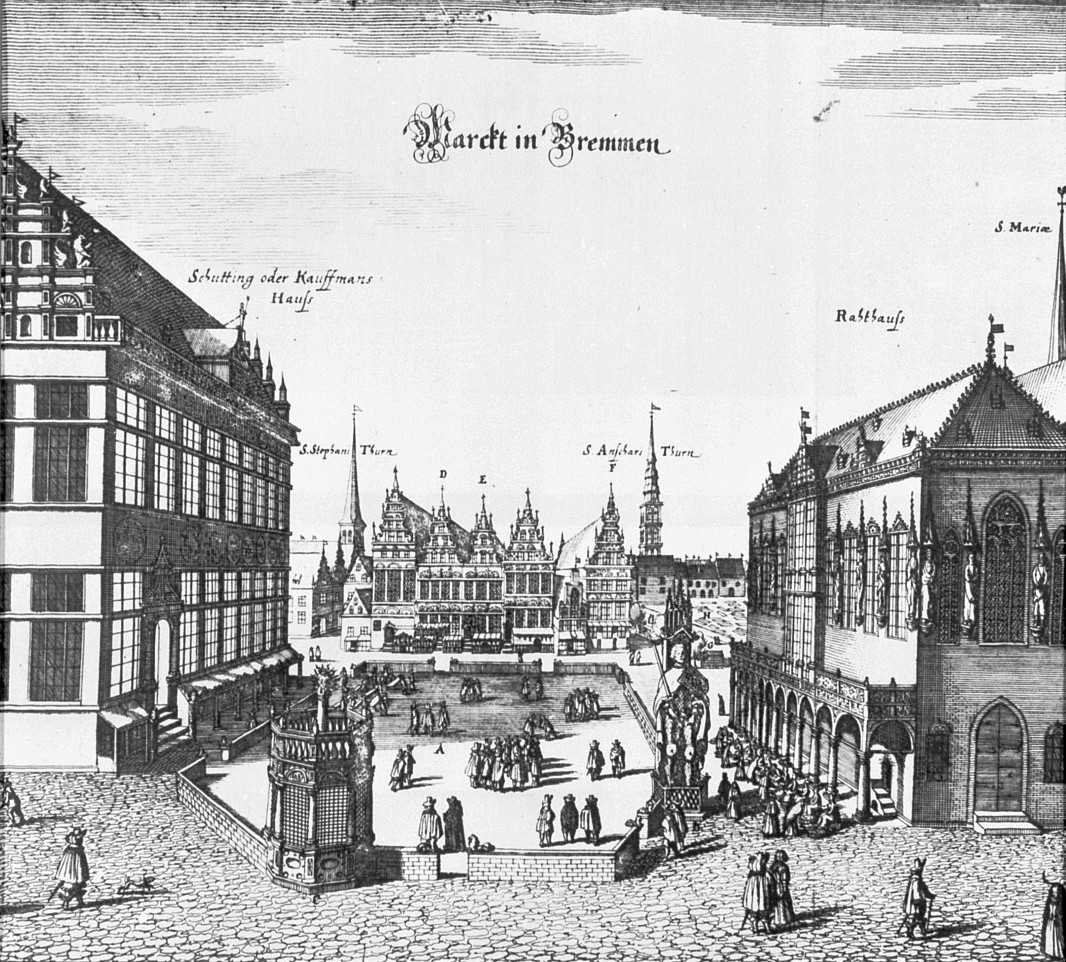
Market square in 1641 by Matthäus Merian

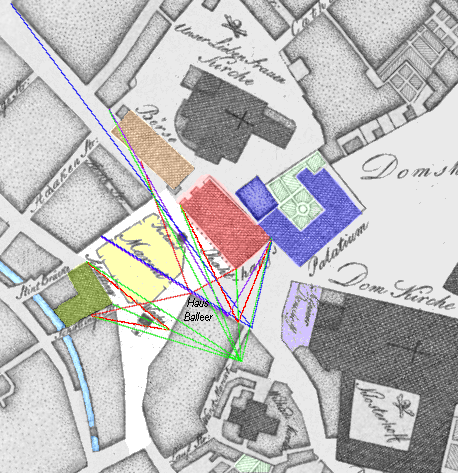
Market place and its surroundings in 1796: Townhall red, archbishop's palace blue, Schütting olive, stock exchange (brown, 1614 to 1687 an uncovered area after the erasion of the shoe hall), general outline like in 1630, possible (red) and fiktive (green) views of Merian's depiction

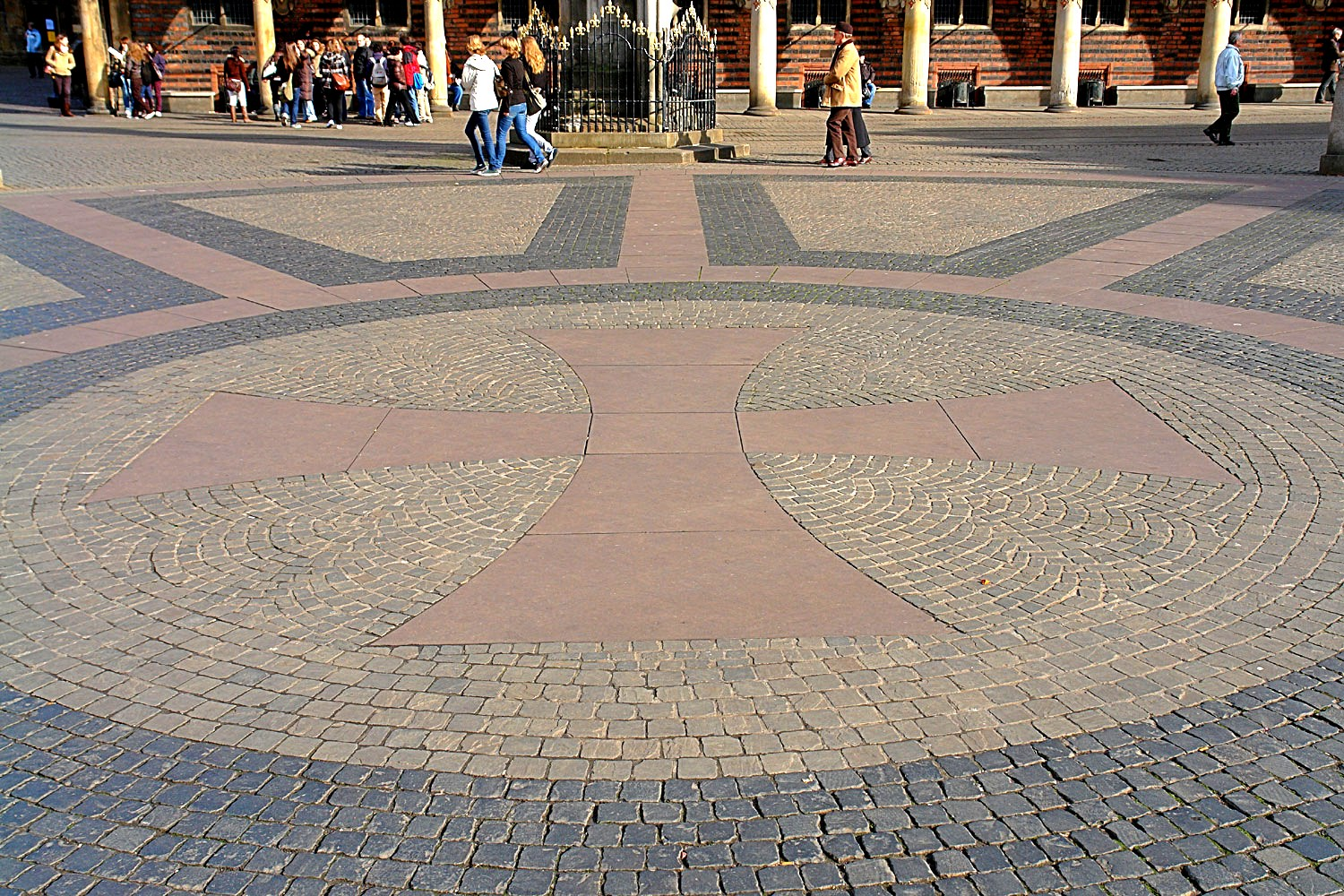
Hanseatic Cross on the market

At least parts of the market place had been in function since the age of Charlemagne. Its southern side originally was the bank of river Balge (river), a branch of the Weser and Bremen's first port. There was an easy access for boats, but this section of the bank was too low for permanent buildings. From late 12th to late 13th century, the area of the market place was levelled and plastered in several stages. Theories that before the construction of the Bremen Town Hall in 1405 to 1410 all or only most of the market activities took place near Liebfrauenkirche have been falsified by archeological findings. Meantime with the townhall, Roland Statue was erected on the market square. Some time later, a stone wall was built between the inner and the outer areas of the square. The inner space was used for the market. A rule was made which allowed only merchants whose vehicles could pass one of the seven openings in the wall to sell their products. The city council made this rule in order to ensure that there was sufficient space for pedestrians between the market stalls.

In the end of the 18th or beginning of the 19th century, the wall was removed and replaced by a circle of columns. At the same time, the market place lost its outstanding importance as a centre of trade and commerce even though it continued to be used as a market until mid 20th century. In 1836, the square was repaved with sandstone. Inside the circle of columns, darker stones depicted a wheel with 10 spokes. At centre of the wheel, reddish stones form a Hanseatic Cross. With a diameter of 4.8 m (16 ft), it commemorates the importance of the Hanseatic Legion during the Wars of Liberation (1813–1815). Between February and June 2002, the pavement was renewed without changing its historical layout.

== Buildings ==
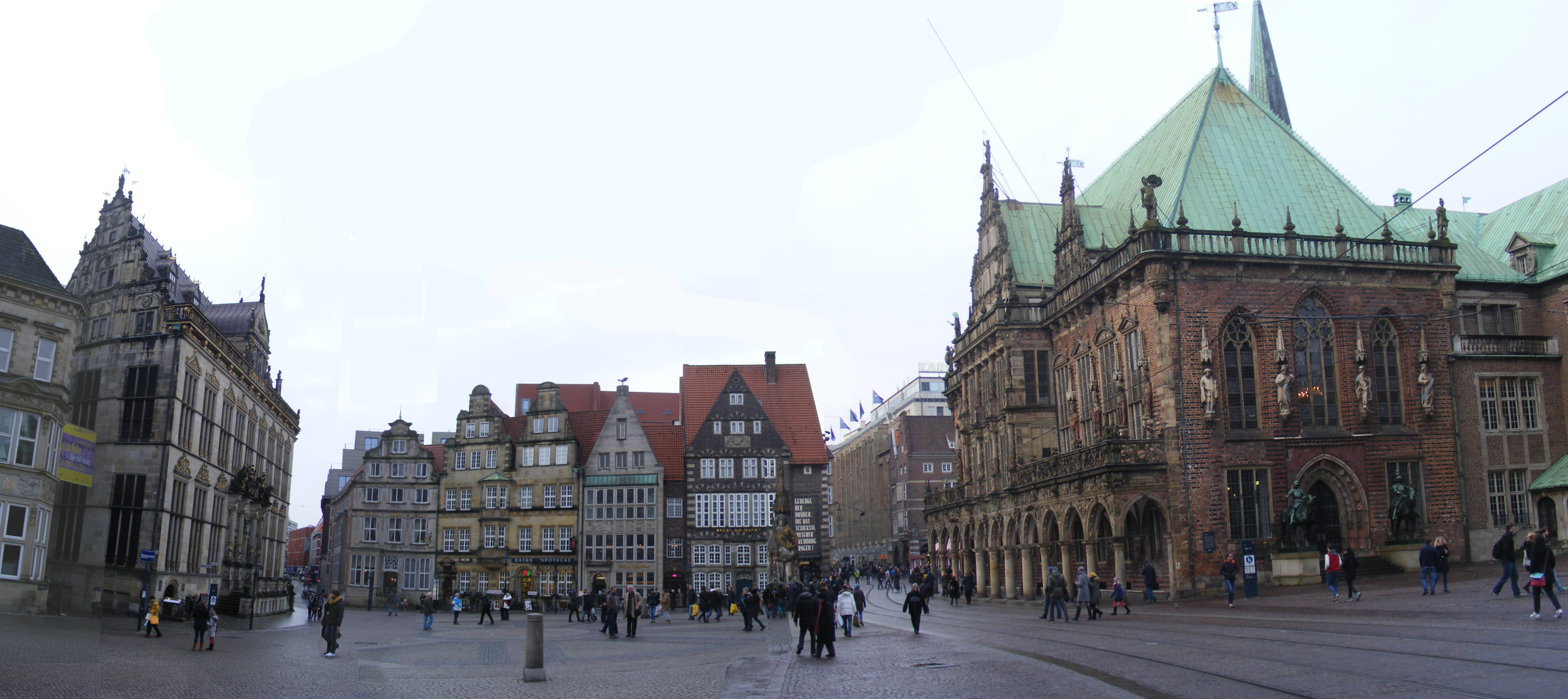
Compilation of photos taken from Merian's possible views

The building ensemble which flanks the Marktplatz is considered one of the most beautiful in Germany. In July 2004, the part consisting of the Roland Statue and the Town Hall was listed as a UNESCO World Heritage Site. Sandstone and brick are uniformly used for the façades of the buildings.

Many objects of historical interest surround the Marktplatz. The entire complex is listed as a heritage site.

- Am Markt 1: Rathscafé/Deutsches Haus, 1908–1911
- Am Markt 9: Haus Jonas und Kaune, 1600 und 1955
- Am Markt 11: Raths-Apotheke, 1893–1894 und 1957/58
- Am Markt 12: Sparkasse am Markt, 1755 und 1958
- Am Markt 13: Schütting, 1537–1538
- Am Markt 14, 15 and 16: Bankhaus Neelmeyer, Wilckens’sches Haus, Bremische Hypothekenbank, Geschäftshaus „Zum Roland“, Niedersaechsische Bank
- Am Markt 17: Medizinisches Warenhaus, 1950
- Am Markt 18: Eduscho-Haus, Bankhaus Carl F. Plump & Co., 1952–1953
- Am Markt 19: Bankhaus Carl F. Plump & Co., 1960
- Am Markt 20: Haus der Bürgerschaft (parliament building), 1962–1966
- Am Markt 21: Town Hall, New Town Hall, Bremen Ratskeller from 1400 till today
- Marktstraße 3: House C of the chamber of commerce, 1956
- Am Dom 1: Bremen Cathedral, from 1041 till today
- Am Dom 2: Küsterhaus (sexton's house), 1926–1928
- Am Dom 5A: Börsenhof A, part of the New Exchange (Neue Börse)
- Böttcherstraße 1, 2, 3, 4, 5, 6, 7, 8 and 9: 1922–1931
- Langenstraße 2, 4, 6 and 8: previously Disconto-Bank, today Kontorhaus am Markt mit Ladenpassage (office building with shopping mall), 1910/12 und 2001/02
- Langenstraße 13: Stadtwaage (Weigh House), with two cultural institutions, the Günter-Grass-Stiftung and the Deutsche Kammerphilharmonie Bremen

== Literature ==
- Schwarzwälder, Herbert (2003). Das Große Bremen-Lexikon (in German). Edition Temmen. ISBN 3-86108-693-X.
- Trunkhardt, Maren; e.V., City Initiative Bremen Werbung (2009). Bremen - der schönste Marktplatz des Nordens: City-Guide 2009 (in German). City Initiative Bremen Werbung e.V.
