= Schütting (Bremen) =

Building in Bremen, Germany

Coordinates: 53°4′32″N 8°48′24″E

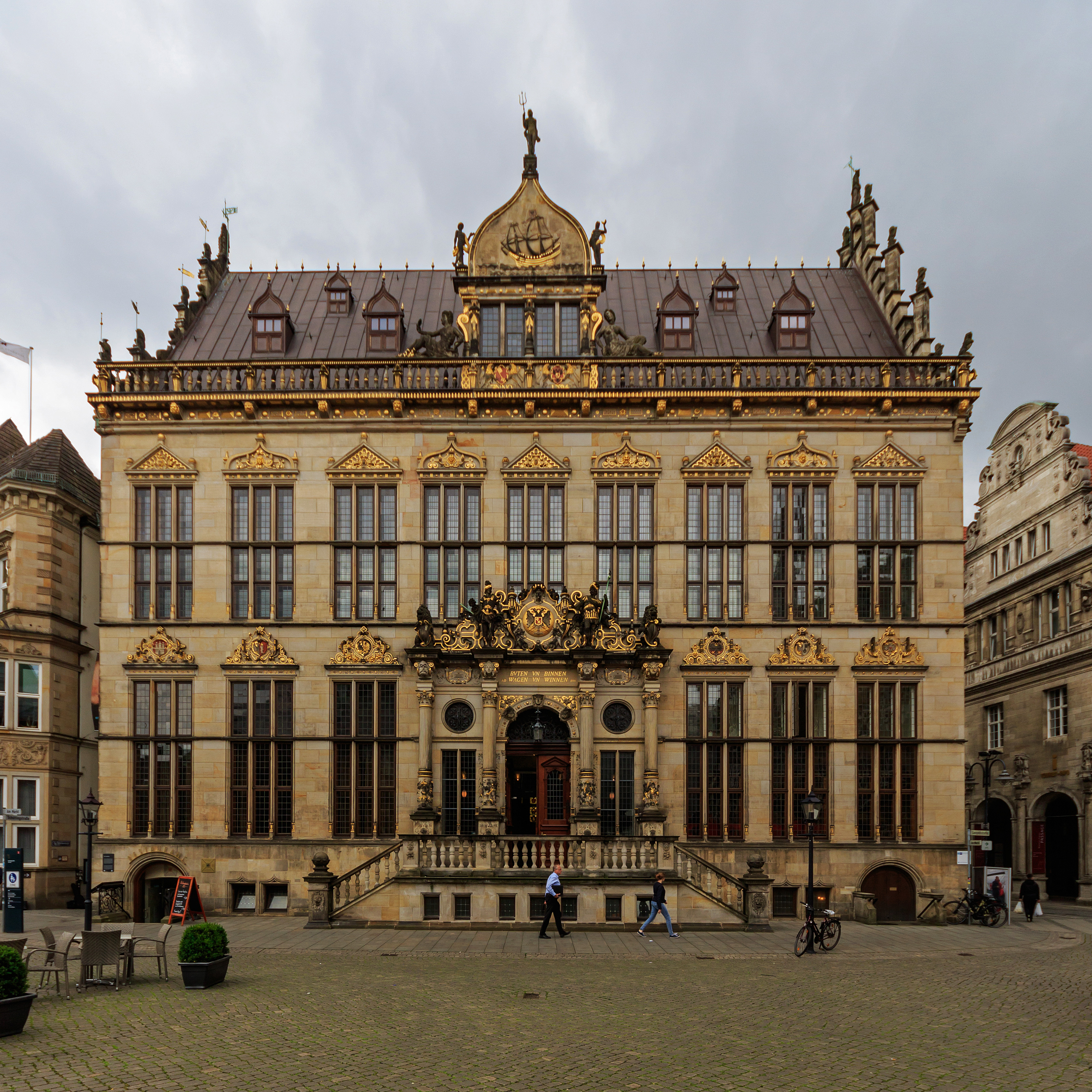
The Schütting in 2016

The Schütting, situated on the Bremer Marktplatz (Bremen Market Square) in Bremen, initially served the city's merchants and tradesmen as a guild house. In 1849, it became Bremen's chamber of commerce. Since 1973, it has been under monument protection. It lies on the south site of the Bremen Market Square directly across from the Bremen City Hall.

== Name ==
Merchants' guildhalls named "Schütting" exist or have existed also in Bergen (Norway), there called Scotting, and in Lübeck, Lüneburg, Oldenburg (since 1604), Osnabrück and Rostock. They did not only serve administrative tasks and social events, but also as accommodation for foreign merchants. Therefore, the name can be related to the German word schützen meaning "to protect".

== Locality and politics ==
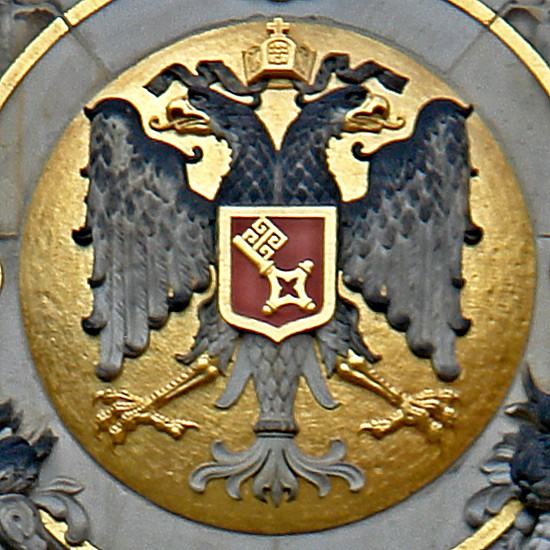
The Bremish merchants' coat of arms above the entrance

The first guild houses of the merchants were former private houses. In 1425, the aldermen purchased a house in Langenstraße on the corner with Hakenstraße. But in 1410, the town hall of Bremen at the market square had been finished, and the eldermen preferred to be as present at that square as the city senate. Therefore, in 1444, they sold the house in the Langenstraße and bought another one, situated between the lower end of the market square (opposite of the town hall) and river Balge, a branch of the Weser. That guid house was already on the site of present-day Schütting. The year 1451 saw a re-organization of the board of the merchants of Bremen. The relations between the merchants were regularised by a treaty named “Ordinantie”, dated 10 January 1451. Until 1849, the organisation bore the name of “Collegium Seniorum”. Thereafter, it changed its name to Bremer Handelskammer (Bremen chamber of commerce). In 1513, the ground of the Schütting was enlarged by the purchase of five adjacent small buildings.

In 1532, there was a rebellion of the lower classes against the dominance of the big merchants in the city of Bremen, called "uprise of the 104 men". The assembly of the 104 forced the merchants guild to leave all its property, including their guild house, to the public. But already in late summer of that year, the rebellion collapsed, and after the restitution of the old order, the eldermen were stronger than before.

== Building history ==
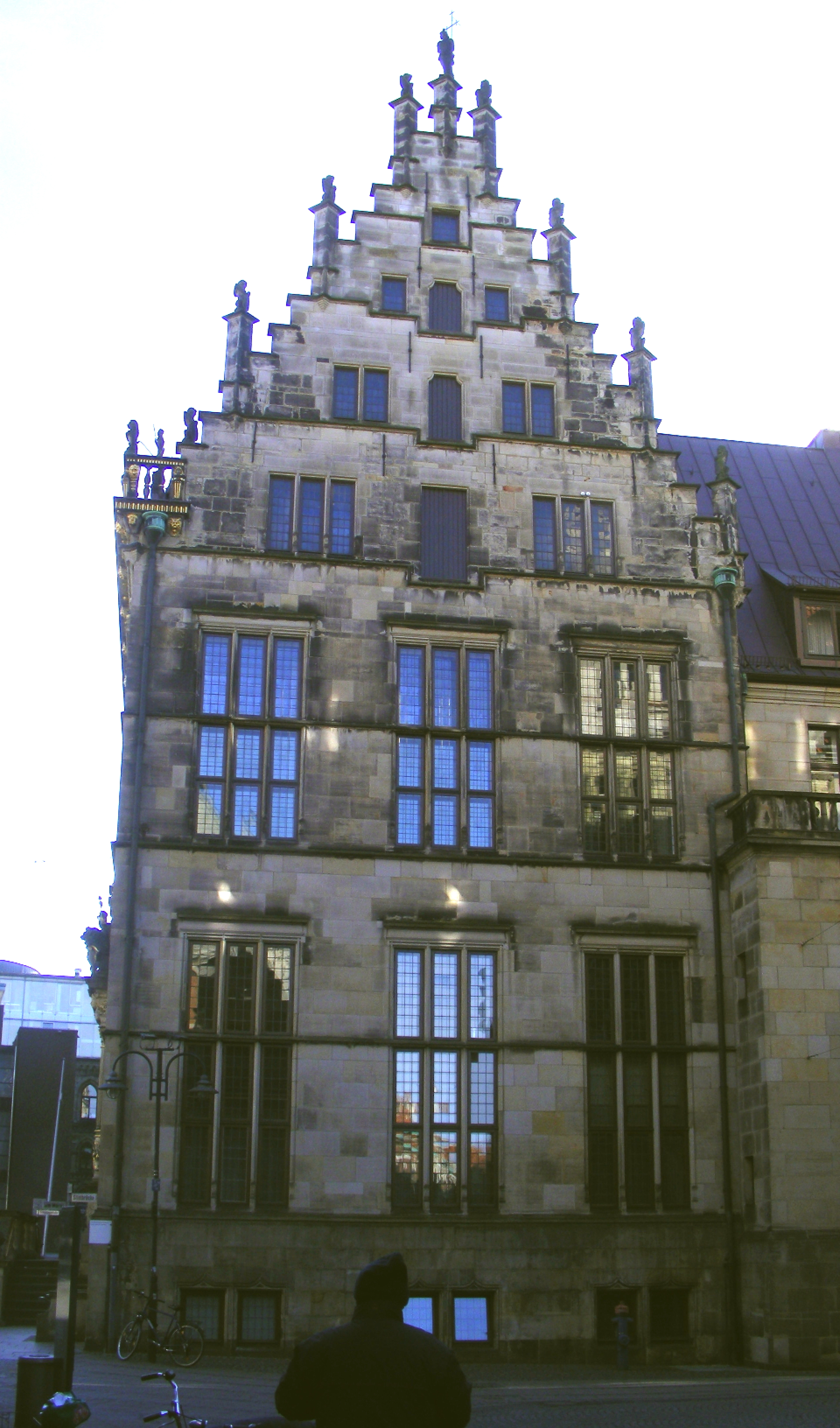
The western gable from 1537/38 with elements of Late Gothic style

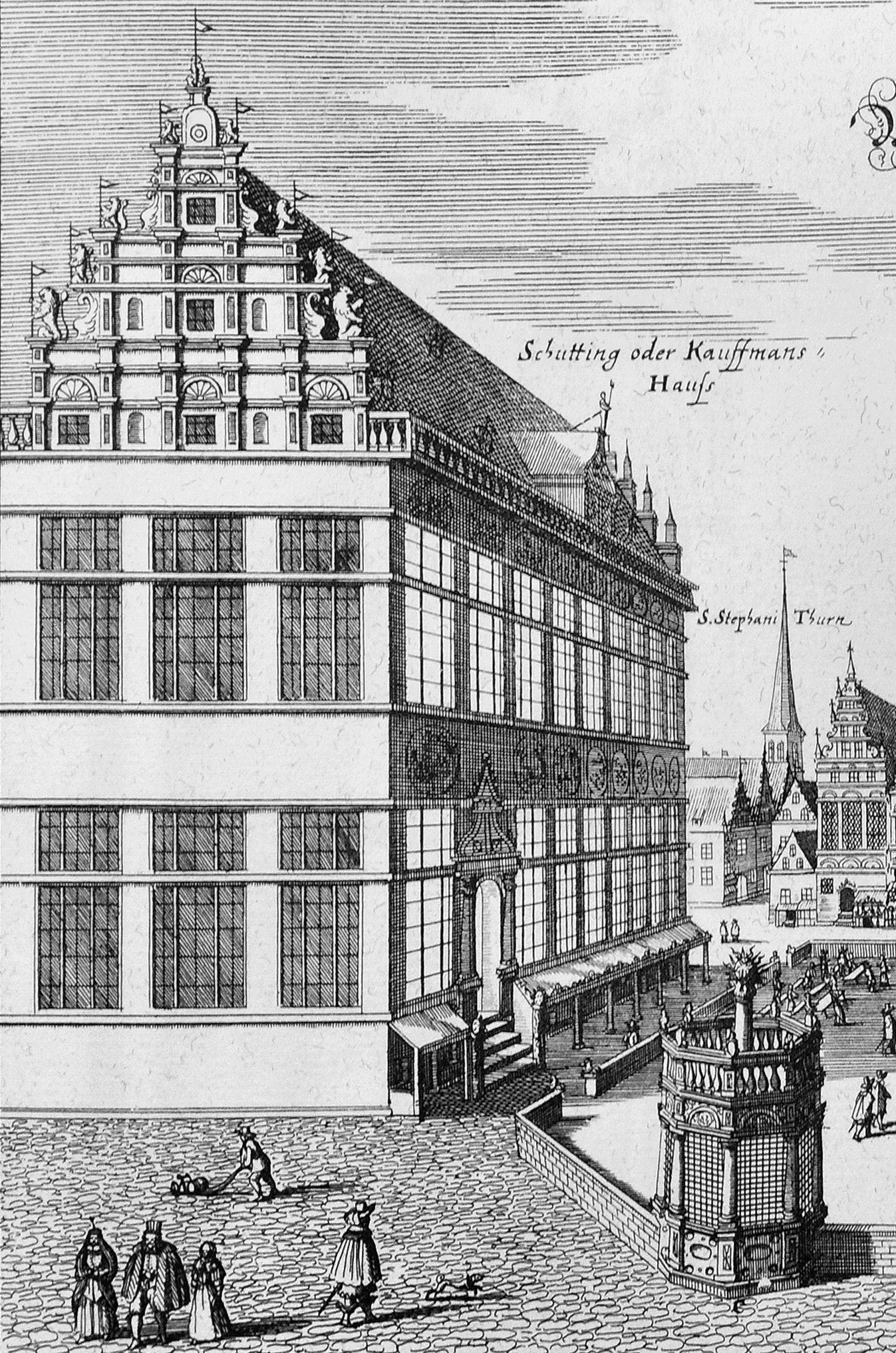
The Schütting in 1641

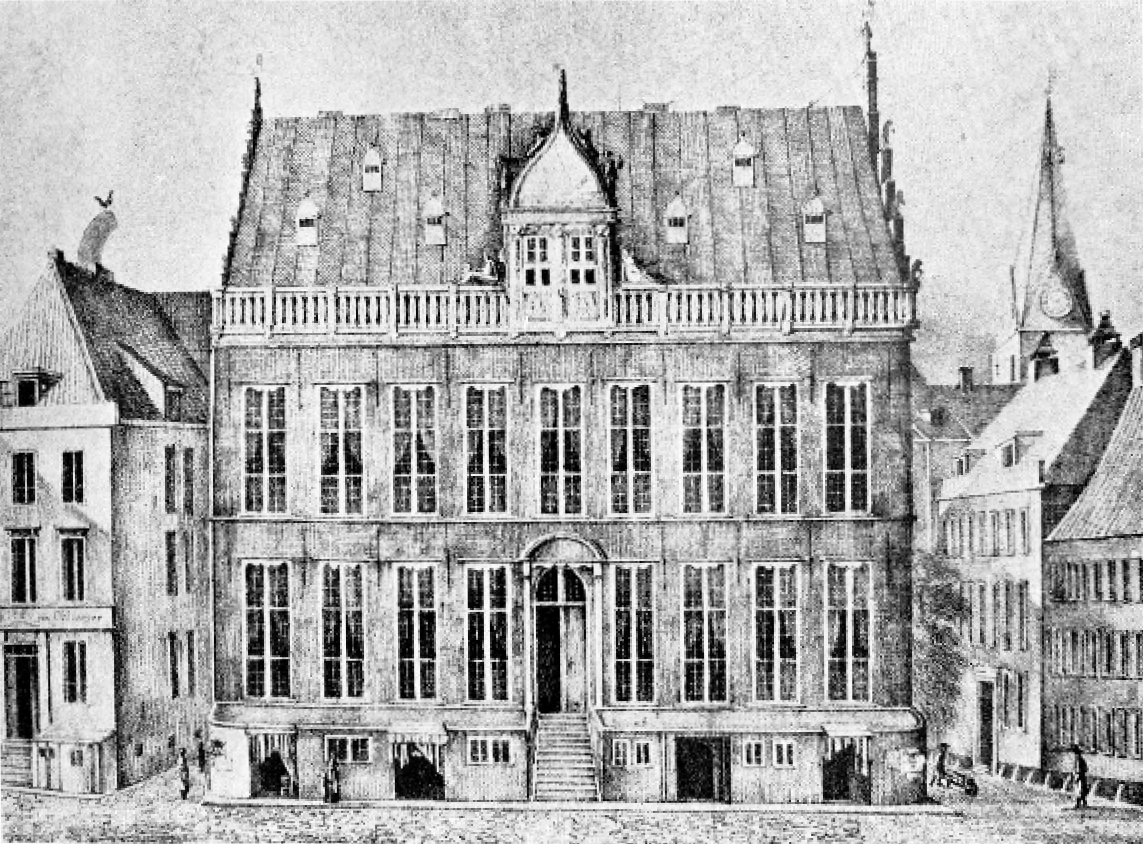
Modest design since 1756, lithograph from 1830

In 1547, the merchants of Bremen charged the Flemish mason and architect Johann den Buschener from Antwerp, who constructed a new building in 1538/39. Due to financial limits, the fine design of the façades lasted much longer. Buschener only completed the stepped western gable, which is on the borderline of Late Gothic and of Renaissance style, and the main entrance, which was not yet central. The eastern gable, pure Renaissance, was crafted in 1565 by a local mason named Karsten Husmann. In 1594, the cornice overlooking the market square was enhanced by a magnificent maritime gable. Lüder von Bentheim, the architect of the Renaissance refresher of the townhall, was engaged in it, too.

In the 18th and 19th centuries, the façade was altered several times: In 1756, Theophilus Freese removed the decentral entrance by a decent central one and reduced the number of horizontal cornices, thus changing the style to a modest kind of Baroque. In mid 19th century the line of low shops in front of the basement was removed, and for the first time a twin staircase to the entrance door was built.

In Wilhelminism, people disliked the noble modesty of the building. In 1895 to 1899, the number of corniches was raised and above the windows relief ornaments were placed. The present bombastic portal was constructed. Above the door, a Low German inscription was added, lately invented by Bremen's mayor Otto Gildemeister

buten un binnen
wagen un winnen

(literally "Outside and in, risk it and win") was added as a motto, meaning that merchants from Bremen are called upon to risk their assets at home and abroad in order to gain fortune. The motto was created by mayor Otto Gildemeister.

The building, with its magnificent interior and its valuable furnishings, burned to the ground on 6 October 1944 following the bombing of Bremen in World War II. Reconstruction was completed in 1956. Except for the dormers on the façade overlooking the market square, the exterior was rebuilt, as it had been since 1899, while the interior was reconfigured. In 1951, the chamber of commerce moved into the ground floor. The second stage of the reconstruction took place over the next five years, including the second floor interior. In 2009, the façade and copper-covered roof were repaired and the dormers were rebuilt. The firm which performed the work received an award in 2010 from the Landesamt für Denkmalspflege (State of Bremen office for the preservation of monuments and historic buildings).

== Gastronomy ==
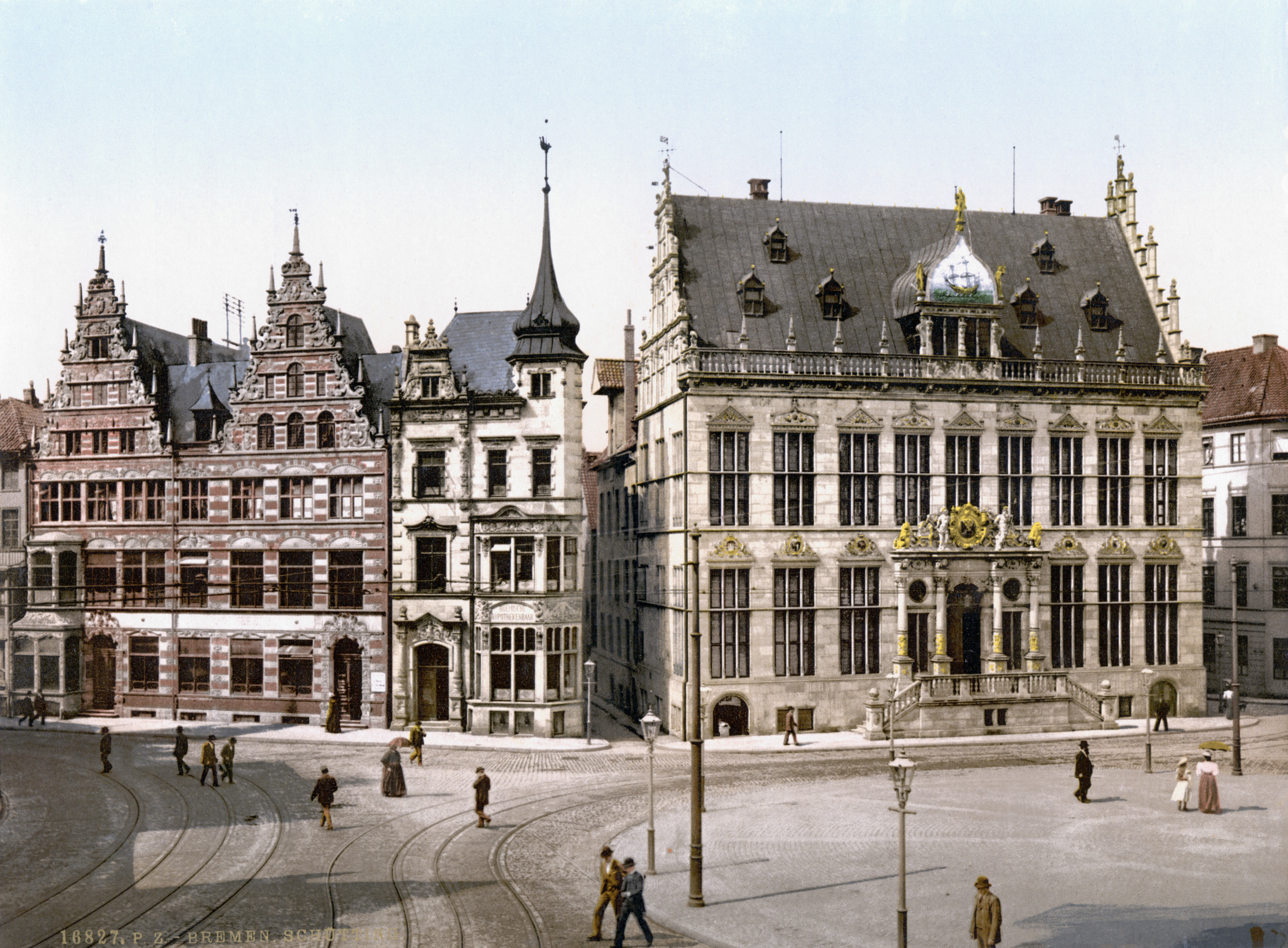
The Schütting in 1900

The first coffee house in the German-speaking countries came into being in Bremen in 1673. Its exact location is not known, but from 1679 onwards, it was located in the Schütting.

In the basement of the Schütting, a traditional gentlemen's club, the “Club zu Bremen”, has its club rooms. Since the year 2000, it has been open to female members, too.

== Literature ==
- Schwarzwälder, Herbert (2003). Das Große Bremen-Lexikon (in German). Edition Temmen. ISBN 3-86108-693-X.
- Konrad Elmshäuser, Hans-Christoph Hoffmann, Hans-Joachim Manske: Das Rathaus und der Roland auf dem Marktplatz in Bremen (Print of the UNESCO World Heritage candidacy); Edition Temmen, Bremen, 2002, ISBN 3-86108-682-4.
- Rudolf Stein, Romanische, gotische und Renaissance-Baukunst in Bremen, Bremen 1962 (in the public library of Bremen state archive)
- Lydia Niehoff: 550 Jahre – Tradition der Unabhängigkeit, Chronik der Handelskammer Bremen. Schünemann Verlag, Bremen 2001, ISBN 3-7961-1827-5.
- Peter Hahn: 450 Jahre Haus Schütting, Sitz der Handelskammer Bremen. Die Baugeschichte, edited by Handelskammer Bremen. Schünemann Verlag, Bremen 1988, ISBN 3-7961-1797-X.
- Handelskammer (board of commerce, the editor): 475 Jahre Haus Schütting, Carl Schünemann Verlag 2012, ISBN 978-3-7961-1004-7
- H. A. Schumacher: Zur Geschichte des Schüttings. In: Bremisches Jahrbuch. Band 5, Bremen 1870, S. 192–214.
