= List of German architects =

The following are German-born or Germany-based architects, listed according to their architectural style.

== Gothic ==
- Adam Kraft (or Krafft) (c. 1460? – January 1509)

== Renaissance ==
- Joseph Heintz (1564–1609)
- Elias Holl (1573–1646)

== Baroque ==
- Cosmas Damian Asam (1686–1739)
- Egid Quirin Asam (1692–1750)
- George Bähr (1666–1738)
- François de Cuvilliés (1695–1768)
- Johann Dientzenhofer (1663–1726)
- Johann Michael Fischer (1692–1766)
- Anselm Franz von Ritter zu Groenesteyn (1692–1765)
- Georg Wenzeslaus von Knobelsdorff (1699–1753)
- Balthasar Neumann (1687–1753) – also an engineer
- Matthäus Daniel Pöppelmann (1662–1736)
- Johann Conrad Schlaun (1695–1773)
- Dominikus Zimmermann (1685–1766)

== Neoclassicism ==
- Carl Ludvig Engel (1778–1840)
- Frederick William von Erdmannsdorff (1736–1800)
- Friedrich Gilly (1772–1800)
- Carl von Gontard (1731–1791)
- Leo von Klenze (1784–1864)
- Carl Gotthard Langhans (1732–1808)
- Karl Friedrich Schinkel (1781–1841) – also a painter
- Paul Ludwig Simon (1771–1815) – also a scientist
- Friedrich Weinbrenner (1766–1826)

== Romanesque revival (Rundbogenstil) ==
- Heinrich Hübsch (1795–1863)
- August Soller (1805–1853)

== Historicism ==
- Hermann Eggert (1844–1920)
- Friedrich von Gärtner (1791–1847)
- Richard Lucae (1829–1877)
- Georg Hermann Nicolai (1812–1881)
- Franz Heinrich Schwechten (1841–1924)
- Gottfried Semper (1803–1879)

== Architectural realism ==
- Constantin Lipsius (1832–1894)
- Paul Wallot (1841–1912)

== Art Nouveau (Jugendstil) ==
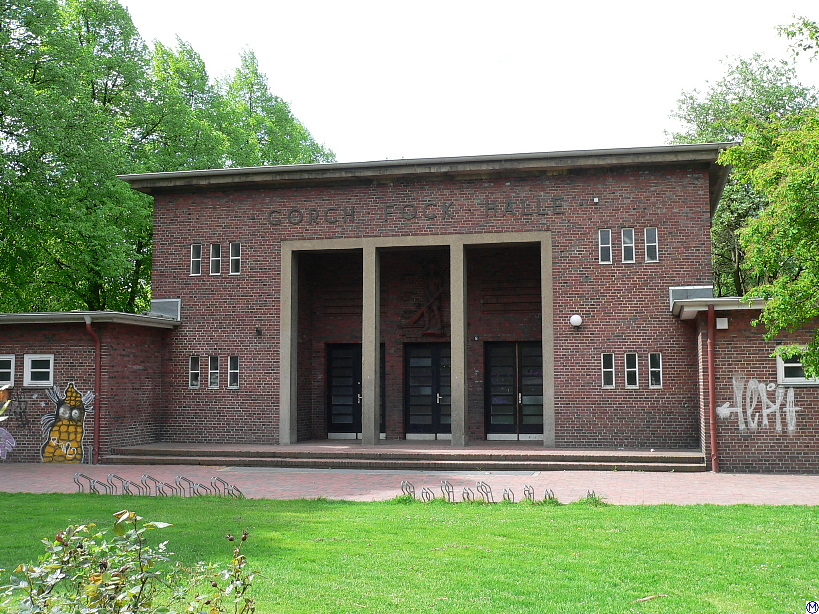
Gorch-Fock-Halle, Finkenwerder

- Fritz Schumacher (1869–1947) – also an urban designer
- Carl Moritz (1863–1944)

== Traditionalism ==
- Rudolf Jacobs (1879–1946)

== Expressionism ==
- Dominikus Böhm (1880–1955)
- Fritz Höger (1877–1949)
- Erich Mendelsohn (1887–1953)
- Hans Poelzig (1869–1936)
- Alfred Runge (1881–1946)
- Eduard Scotland (1885–1945)

== Organic ==
- Hugo Haring (1882–1958)
- Hans Scharoun (1893–1972)

== Neue Moderne ==
- Peter Behrens (1868–1940)
- Eberhard Gildemeister (1897–1978)
- Walter Hohmann (1880–1945) – also a civil engineer
- Rudolf Jacobs (1879–1946)
- Paul Schneider-Esleben (1915–2005)
- Bruno Taut (1880–1938)
- Emilie Winkelmann (1875–1951)

== Bauhaus ==
- Edmund Collein (1906–1992)
- Erich Consemüller (1902–1957)
- Walter Gropius (1883–1969)
- Lucy Hillebrand (1906–1997)
- Konrad Püschel (1907–1997)
- Lotte Stam-Beese (1903–1988)

== Nationalism ==
- Richard Ermisch (1885–1960)
- Wilhelm Kreis (1873–1955)
- Franz Ruff (1906–1979)
- Albert Speer (1905–1981)
- Paul Troost (1878–1934)

== Internationalism ==
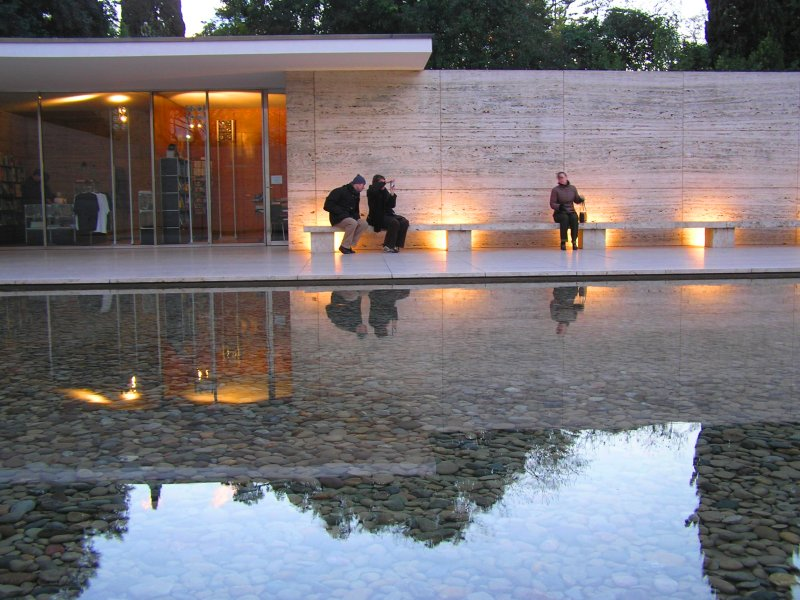
Ludwig Mies van der Rohe's Barcelona Pavilion – the German pavilion at the 1929 Barcelona International Exposition in Barcelona, Spain – is one of the most influential pieces of German architecture

- Stephan Braunfels (born 1950)
- Dörte Gatermann (born 1956)
- Helmut Jahn (1940–2021) – also a designer
- Ludwig Mies van der Rohe (1886–1969)

== Deconstructivism ==
- Günther Behnisch (1922–2010)
- Elisabeth Böhm (1921–2012)
- Gottfried Böhm (1920–2021)

== High tech ==
- Frei Otto (1925–2015) – also a research scientist

== Eco tech ==
- Hans Kollhoff (born 1946)

== Contemporary modernist ==
- Annabelle Selldorf (born early 1960s) – architect in New York
- Sergei Enwerowitsch Tschoban (born 1962) – Russian-born

== Sustainable architecture ==
- Anna Heringer (born 1977)
- Christoph Ingenhoven (born 1960)

== See also ==
- List of architects
- List of Germans
