= Langenstraße (Bremen) =

Historical street in the old town of Bremen, Germany

Coordinates: 53°04′35″N 8°48′18″E

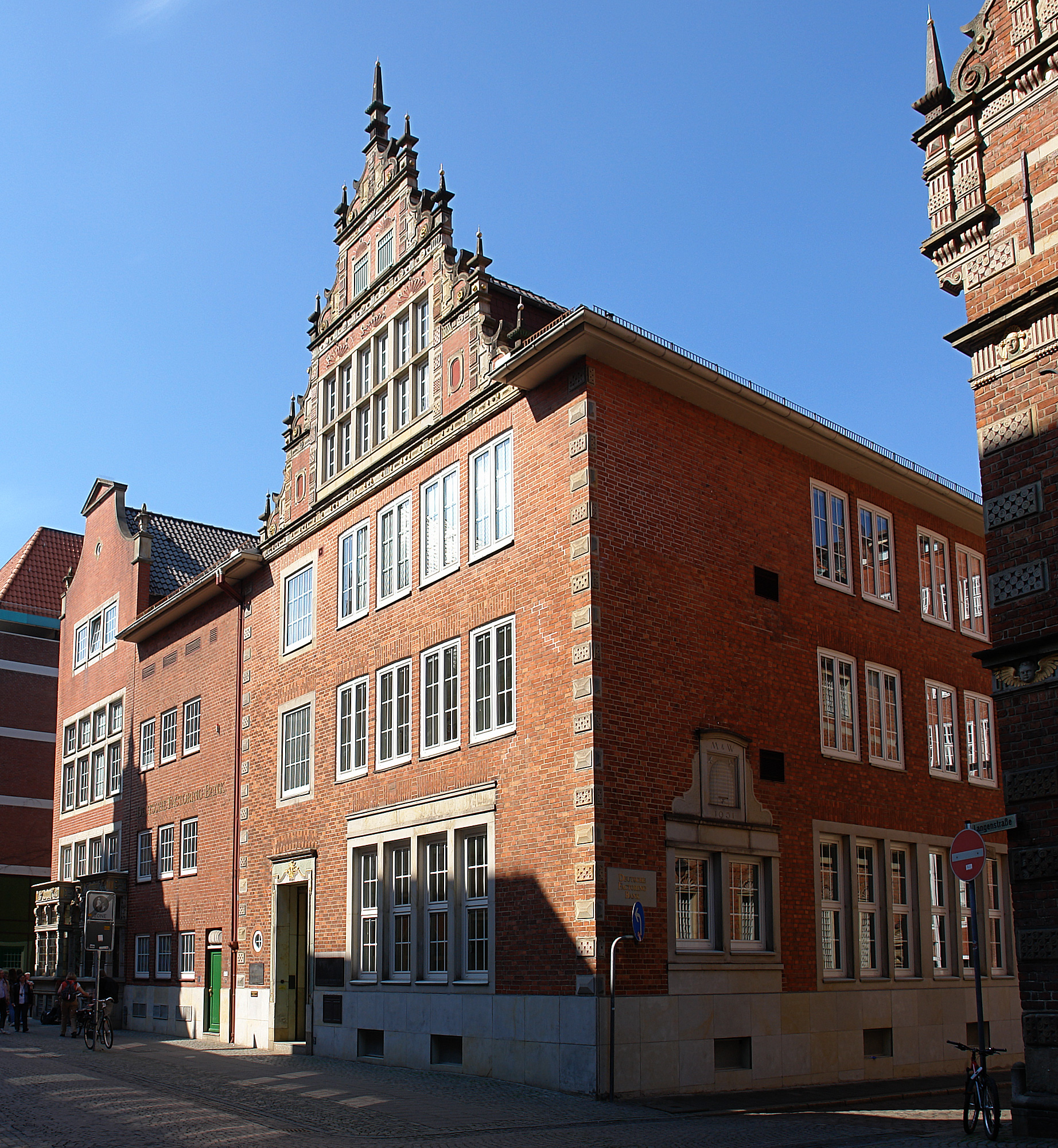
The Martens und Weyhausen bank building on Langenstraße

The Langenstraße is a historical street in the old town of Bremen in the north of Germany. First mentioned in 1234, it is one of Bremen's oldest streets and one of the most important for the city's merchants. It originated at the time when the first settlements grew up on the north bank of the Balge. It runs west from the Marktplatz parallel to the River Weser over Bürgermeister-Smidt-Straße to Geeren. Many of the street's historic buildings were seriously damaged during aerial bombings in the Second World War but were carefully reconstructed in the postwar period.

== Landmarks ==
There are many historic buildings along the road, many of them listed. On the corner of the market square, the Sparkasse am Markt is a gabled building reconstructed in 1958 by Eberhard Gildemeister who made use of a Baroque facade originally located at 31B, An der Schlachte. The facade was built by the stonemason Theophilus Wilhelm Frese in 1755 with bay windows, a wigged upper gable and Rococo decorations.

The Kontorhaus am Markt stretching from No. 2 to No. 8 consists of a group of buildings designed by Richard Bielenberg and Josef Moser in the Neo-Renaissance style and completed in 1912. First used as a bank, the Kontorhaus complex has now been converted into a shopping centre with office accommodation. Of special interest is the portal flanked by columns and decorated with allegorical sculptures.

The Stadtwaage at No. 13 is a former weigh house used for weighing goods for the purpose of levying taxes. The original brick building from 1588 in the Weser Renaissance style was almost completely destroyed in 1944 apart from its outer walls. The new building constructed in 1960 maintains the original gable. It is now used as a cultural centre.

The Deutsche Factoring Bank building (earlier Bankhaus Martens & Weyhausen) which covers the section from No. 15 to No. 21 was reconstructed in 1955 after serious war damage. It contains the Renaissance Essighaus portal with bay windows from 1618 and the gable of the former Sonnenapotheke (1770).

The Suding & Soeken building at No. 28 (from c. 1620) is noted for its projecting bay window and its two-tiered Baroque stairway ascending from the hallway.

Other listed buildings of note are the house at No. 16 in the Renaissance style from 1715, and the Bank für Handel und Gewerbe, Bankverein für Nordwestdeutschland, Bremer Bankverein at No. 3 to 5 (first built 1912),

== Gallery ==
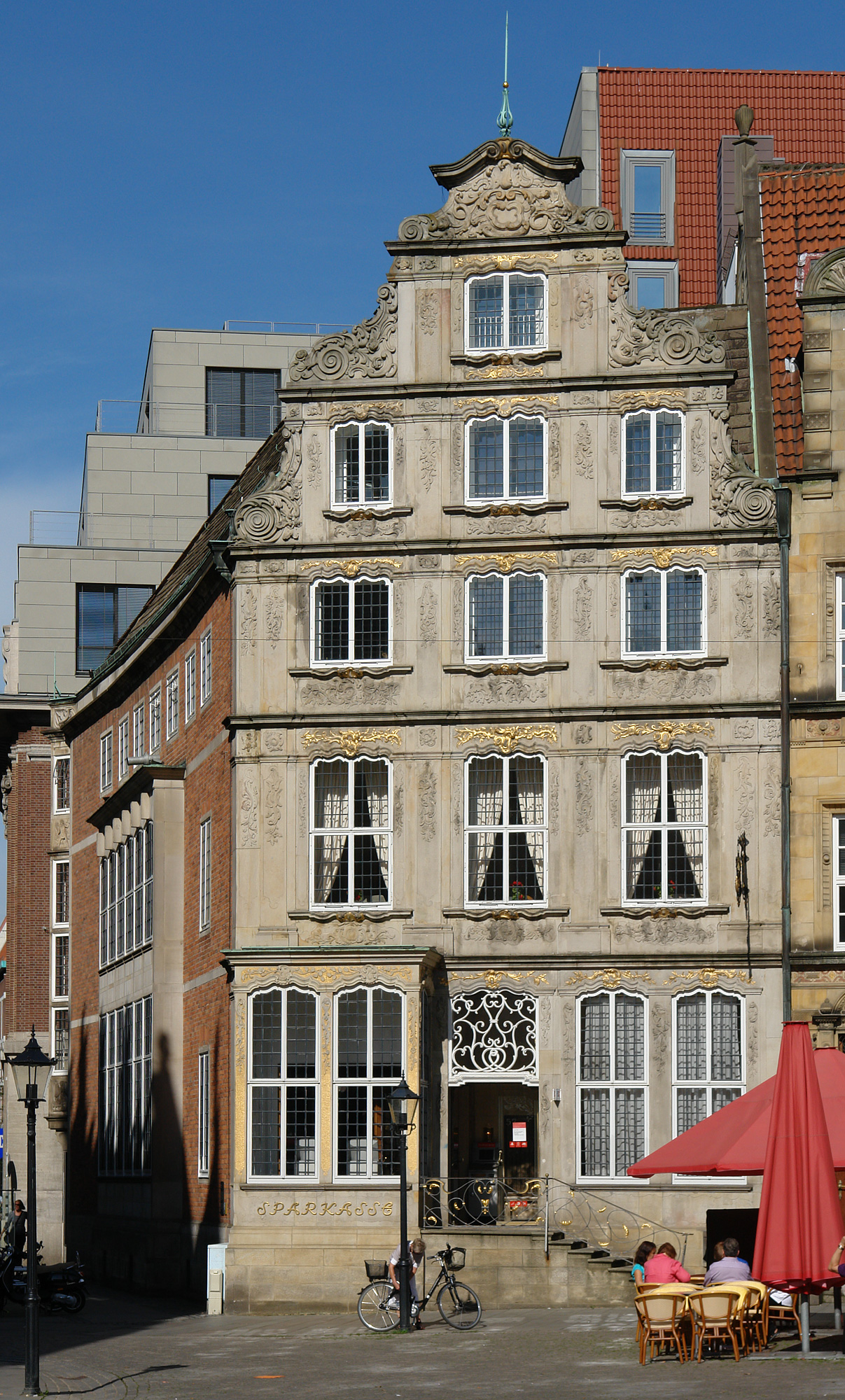
No. 1: Sparkasse am Markt

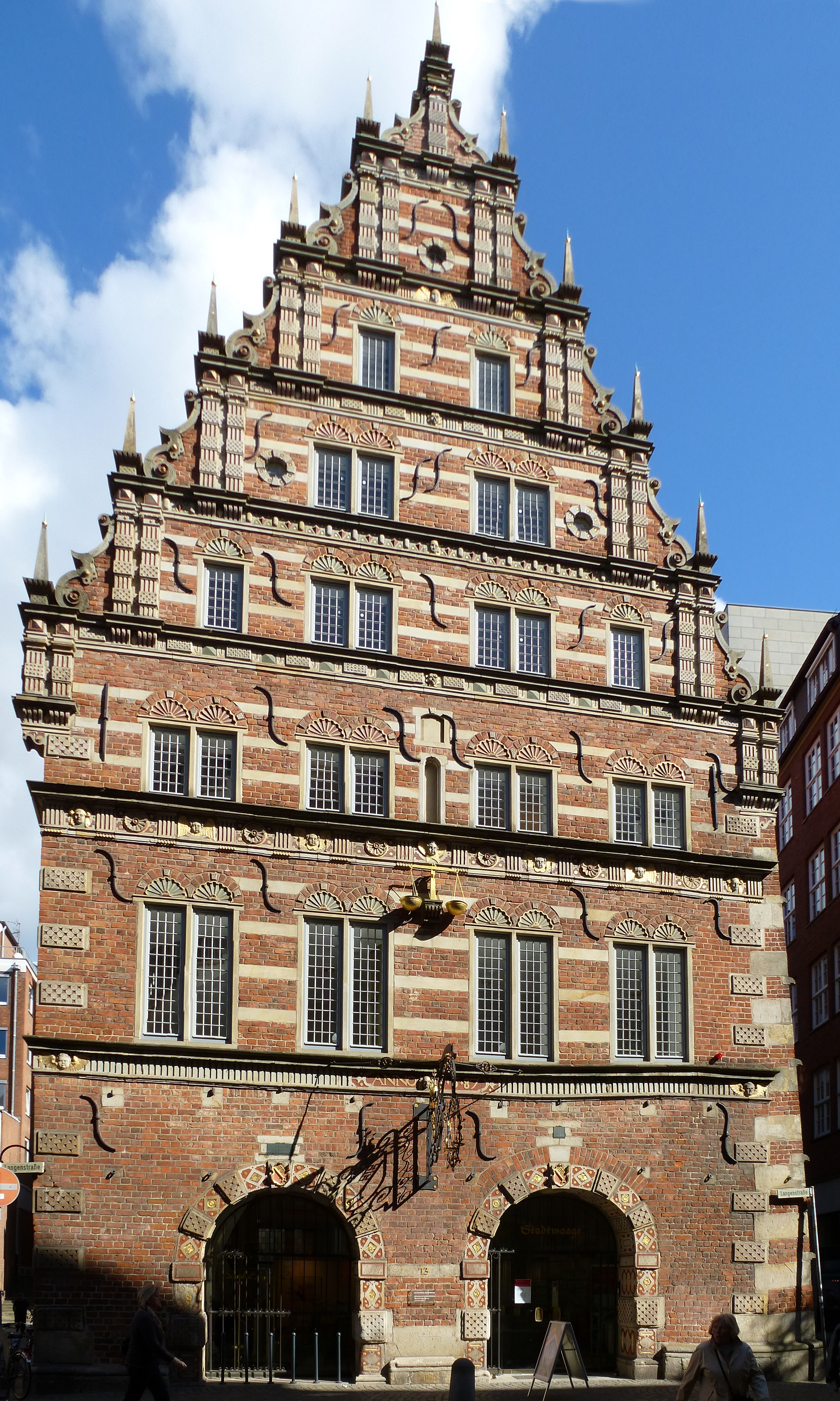
No. 13: Stadtwaage

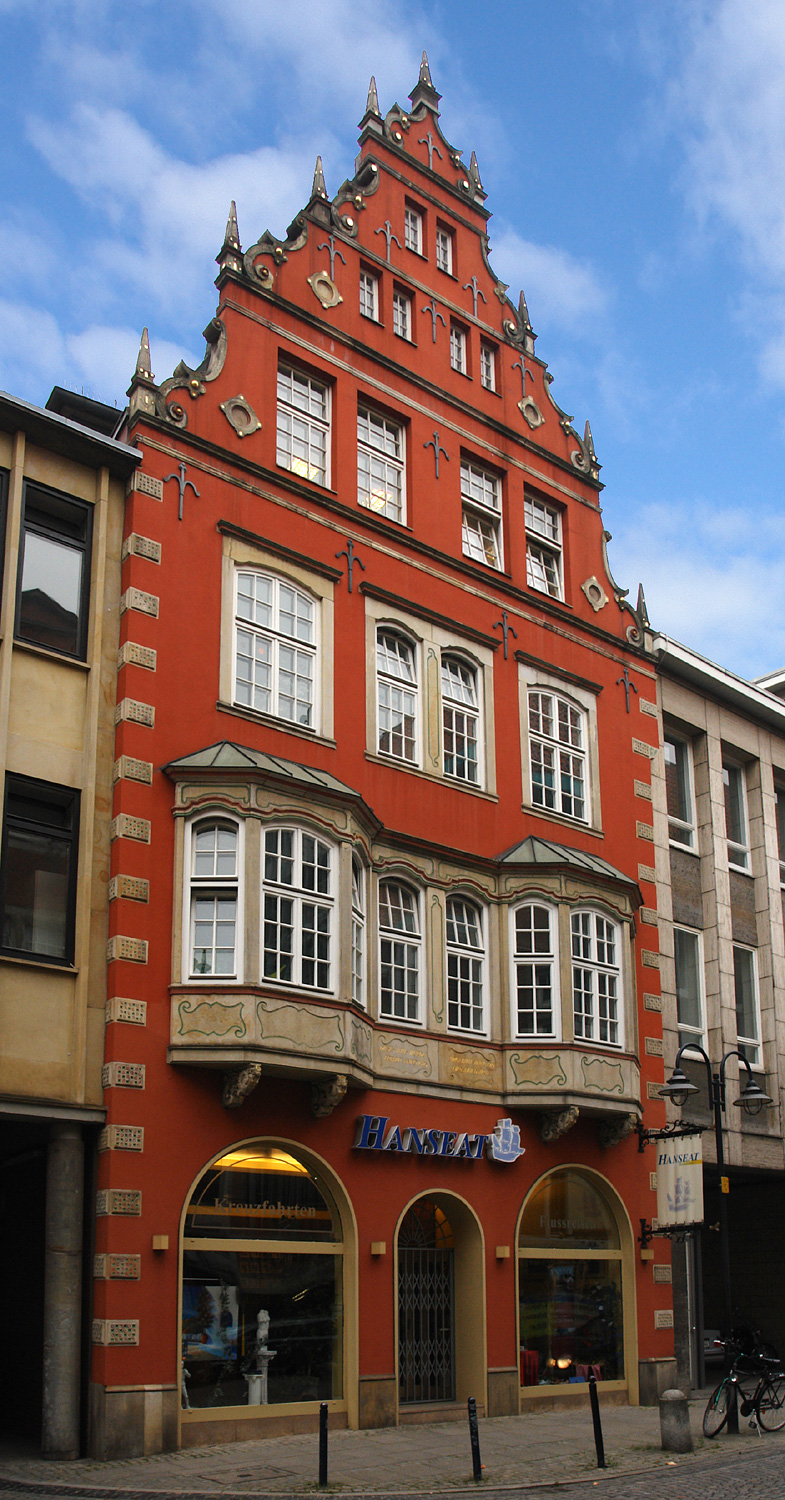
No. 16 Langenstraße, 17th-century residence

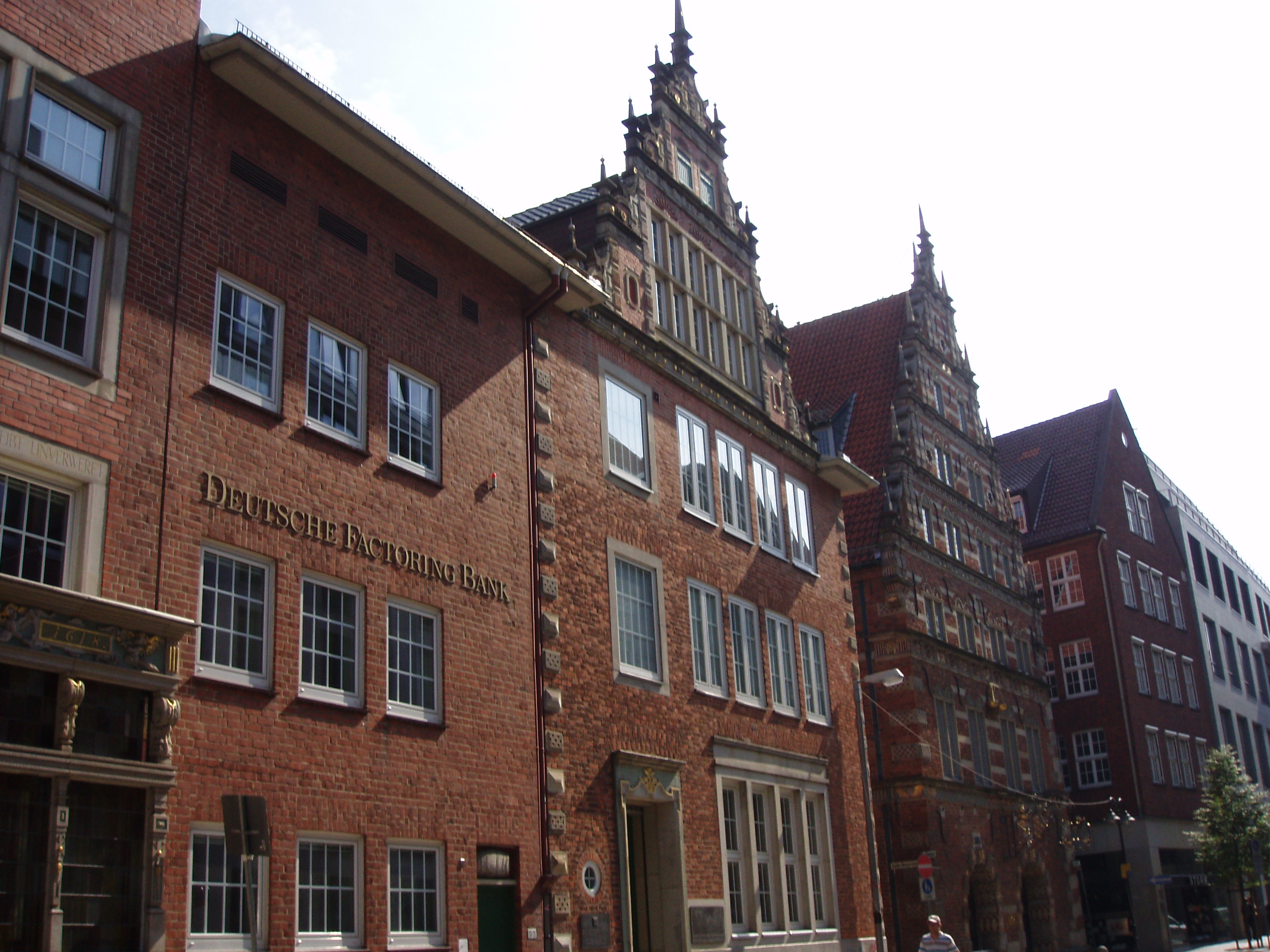
Section between the Essighaus (left) and the Stadtwaage (right)

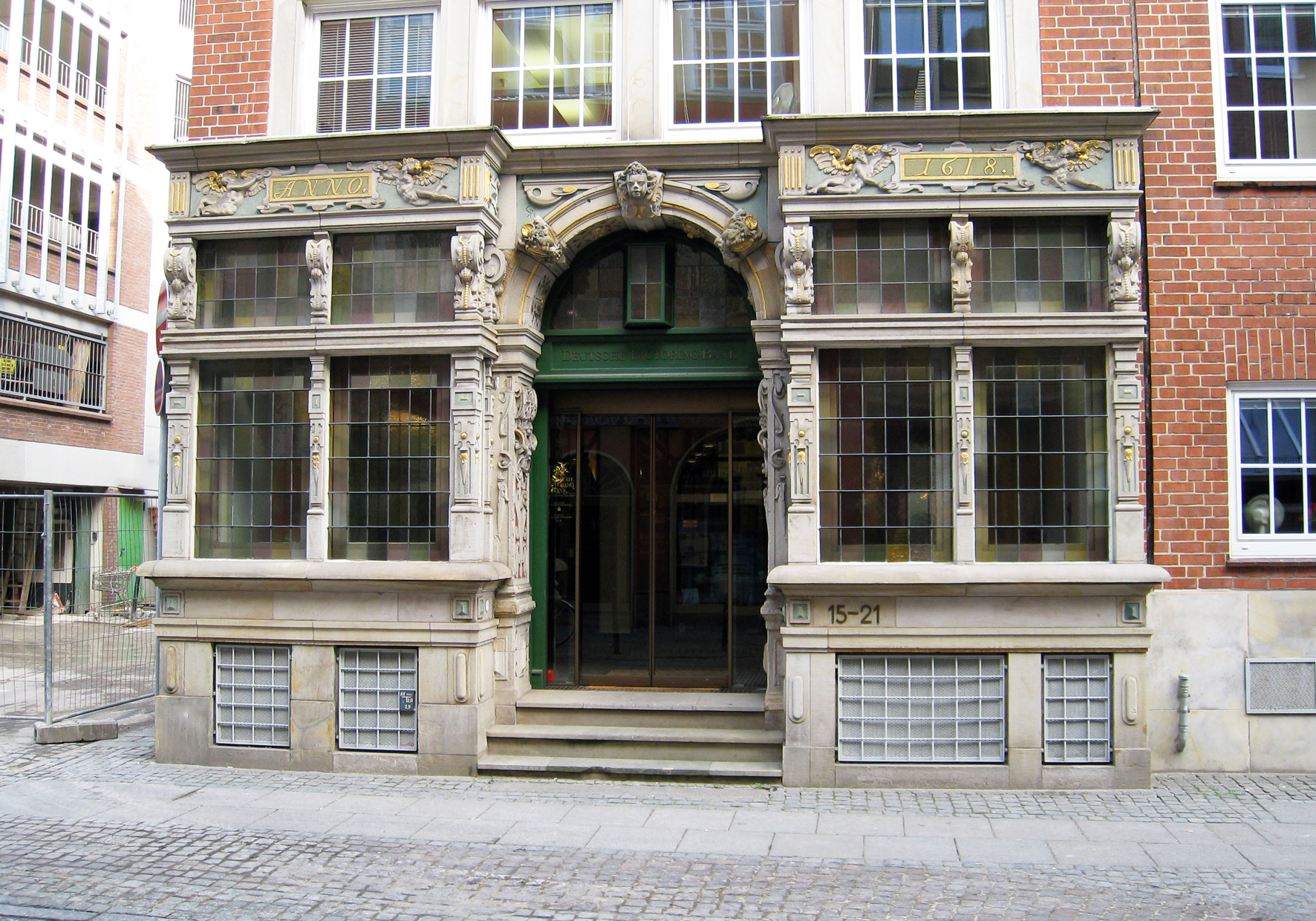
Essighaus portal and bay windows

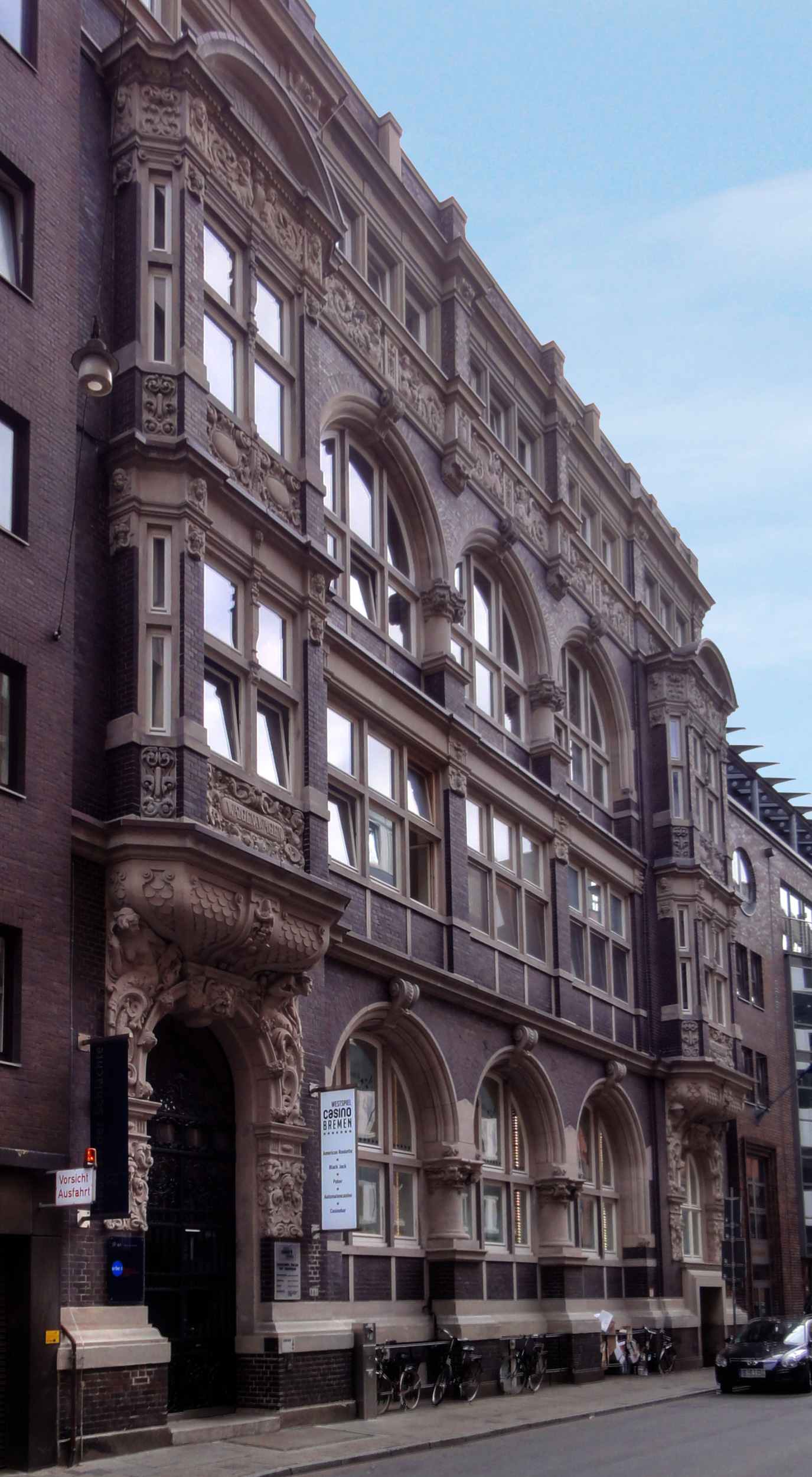
No. 38-42: Reisbörse, Argo-Haus

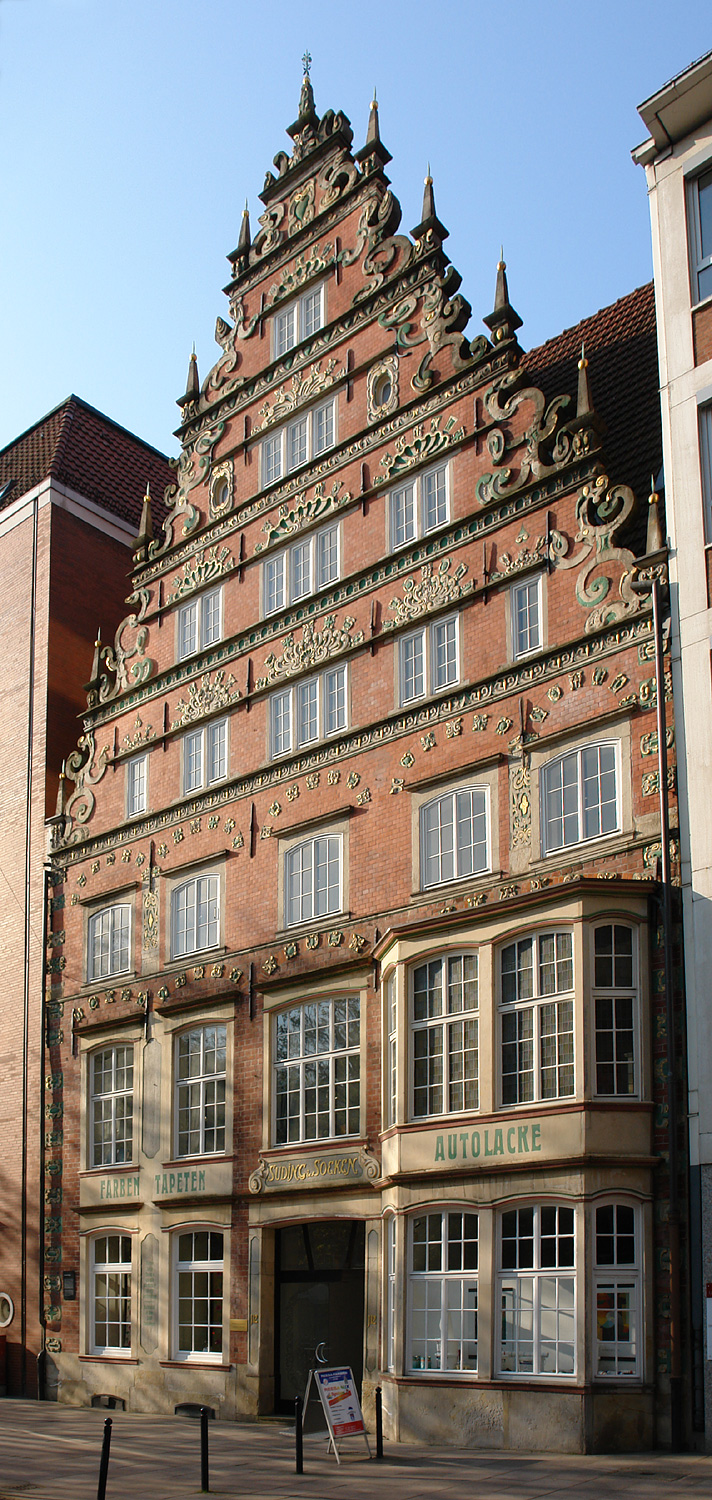
No. 28: Suding und Soeken building (c. 1620)

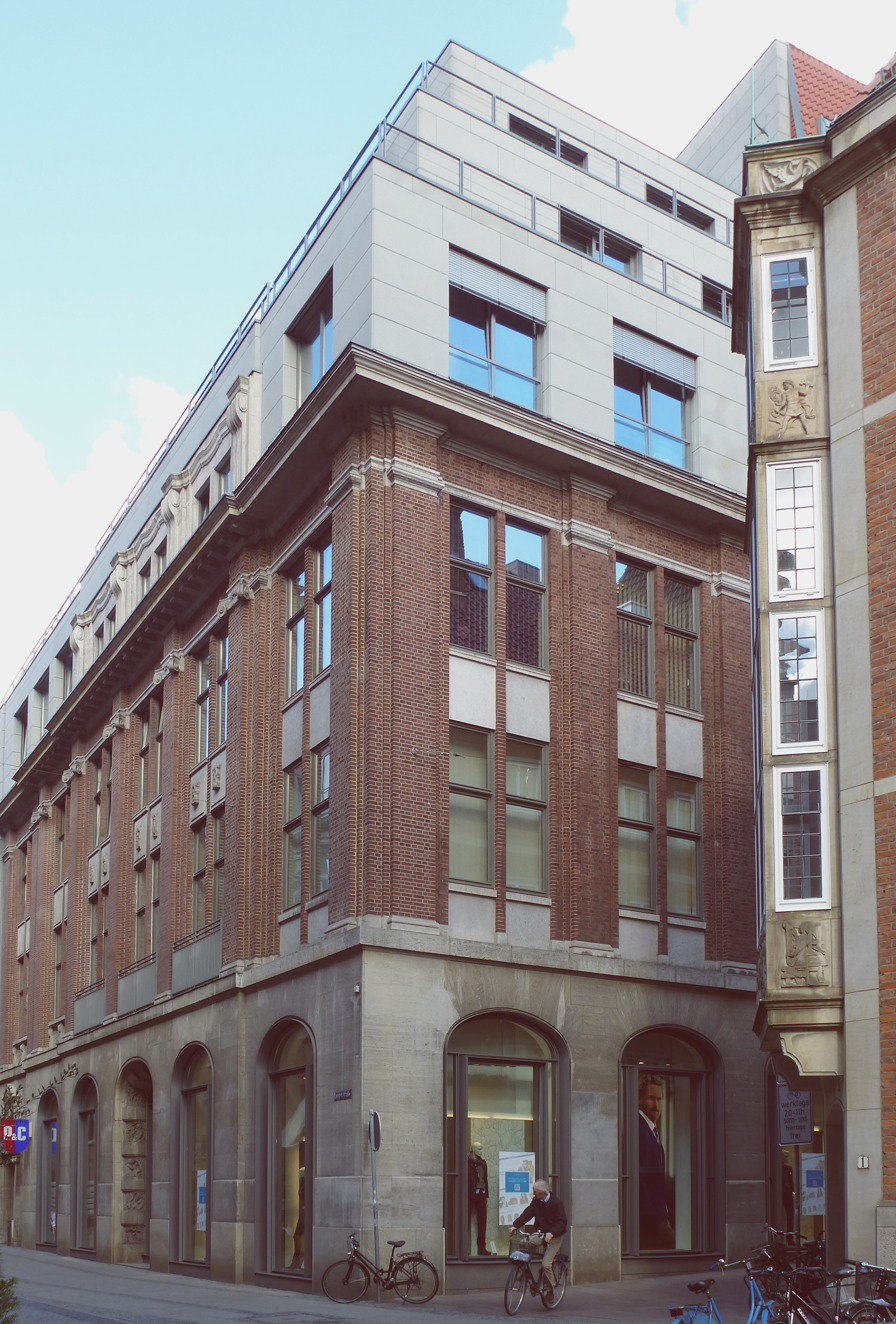
No. 3: Bank Verein building

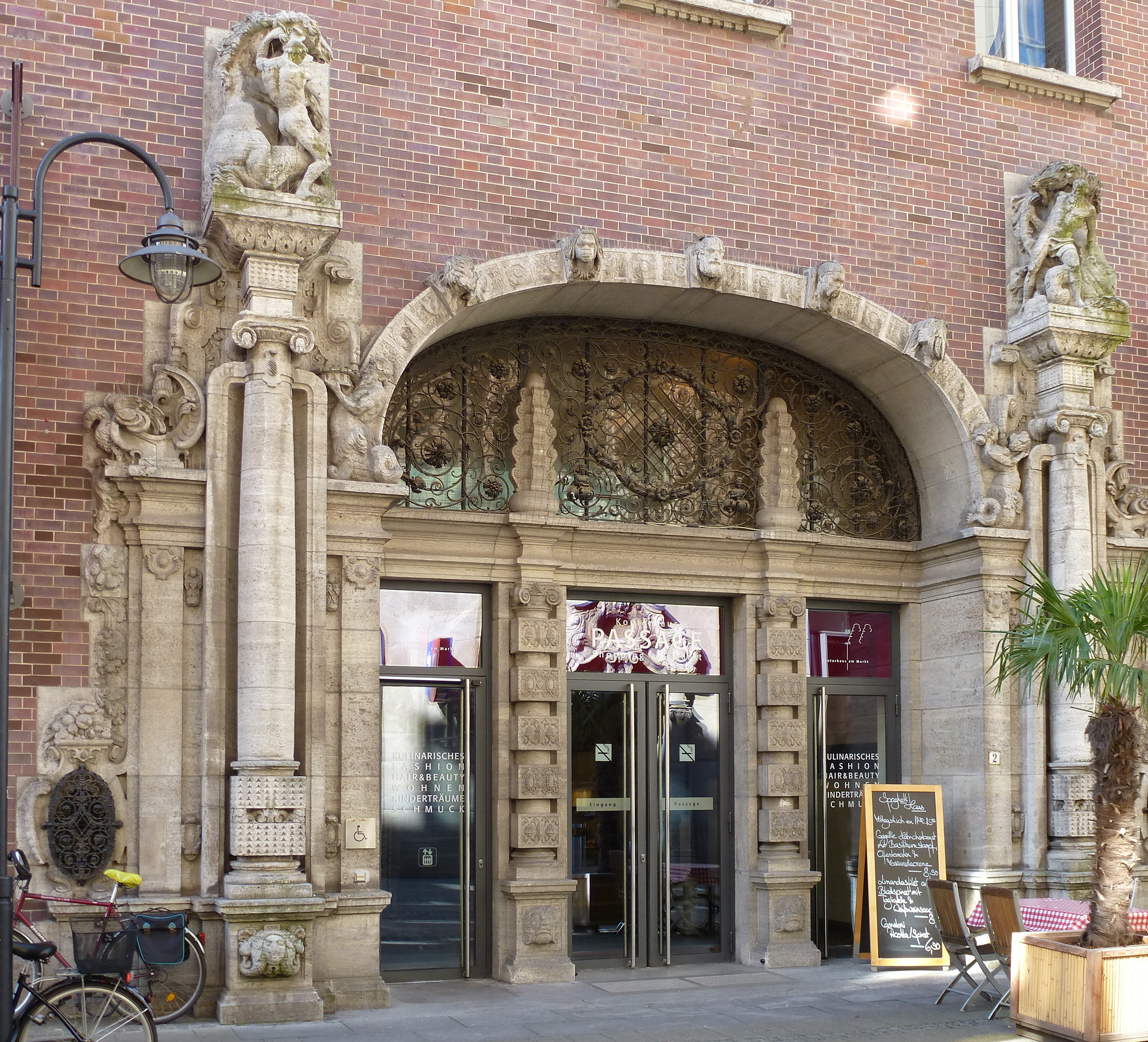
Kontorhaus portal

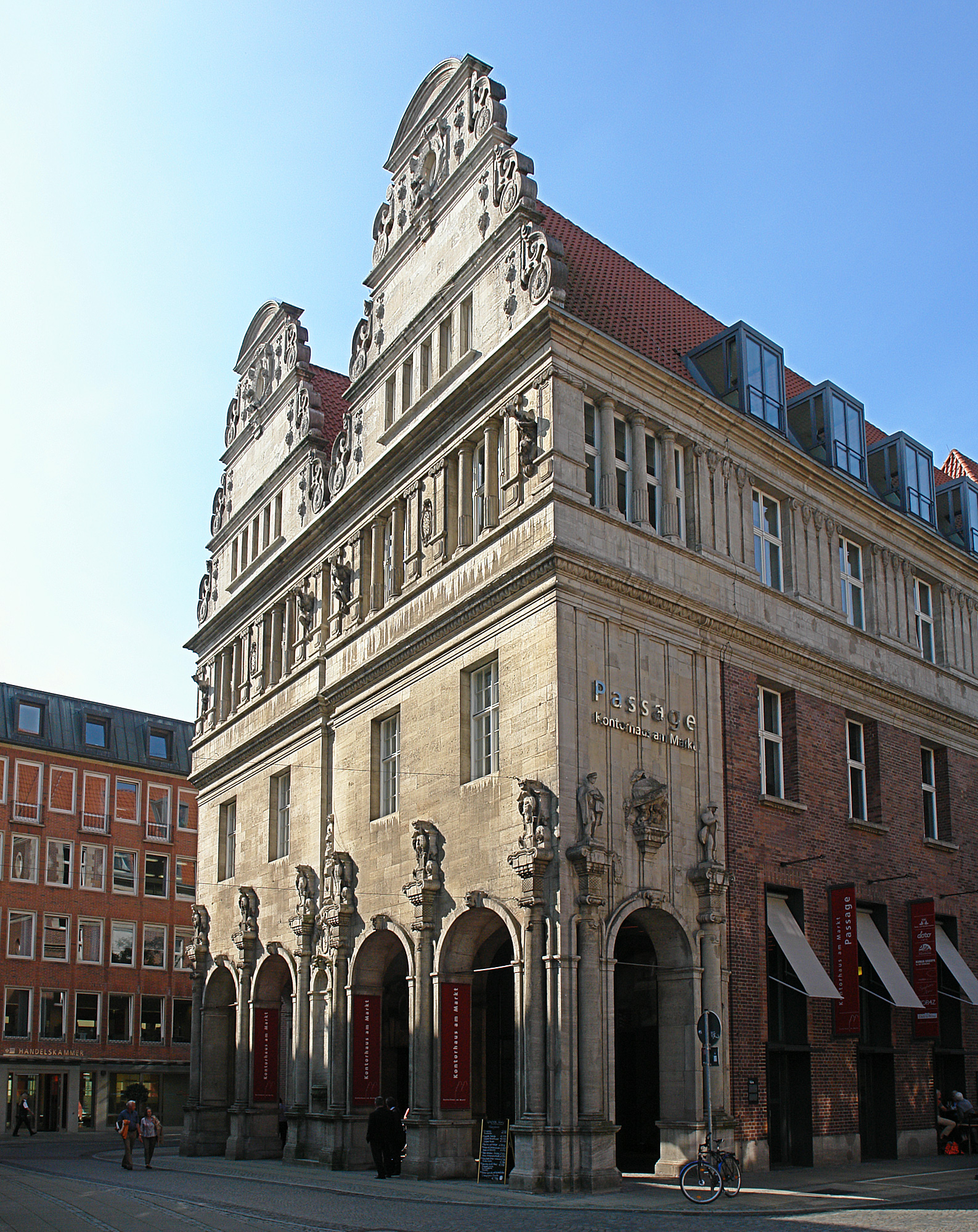
No. 2: Kontorhaus am Markt
