= Stadtwaage (Bremen) =

Coordinates: 53°4′34.83″N 8°48′19.66″E

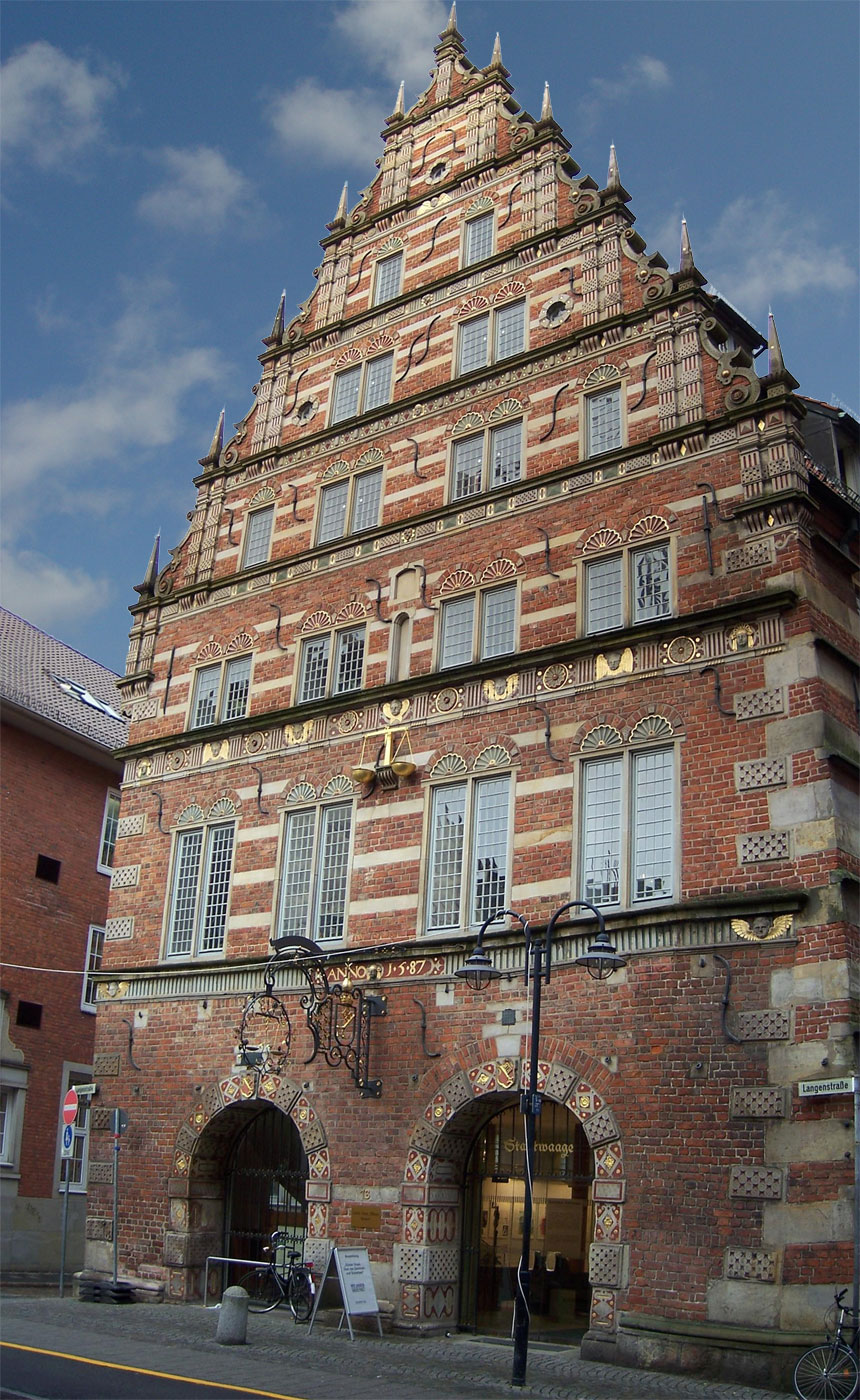
Stadtwaage 2005

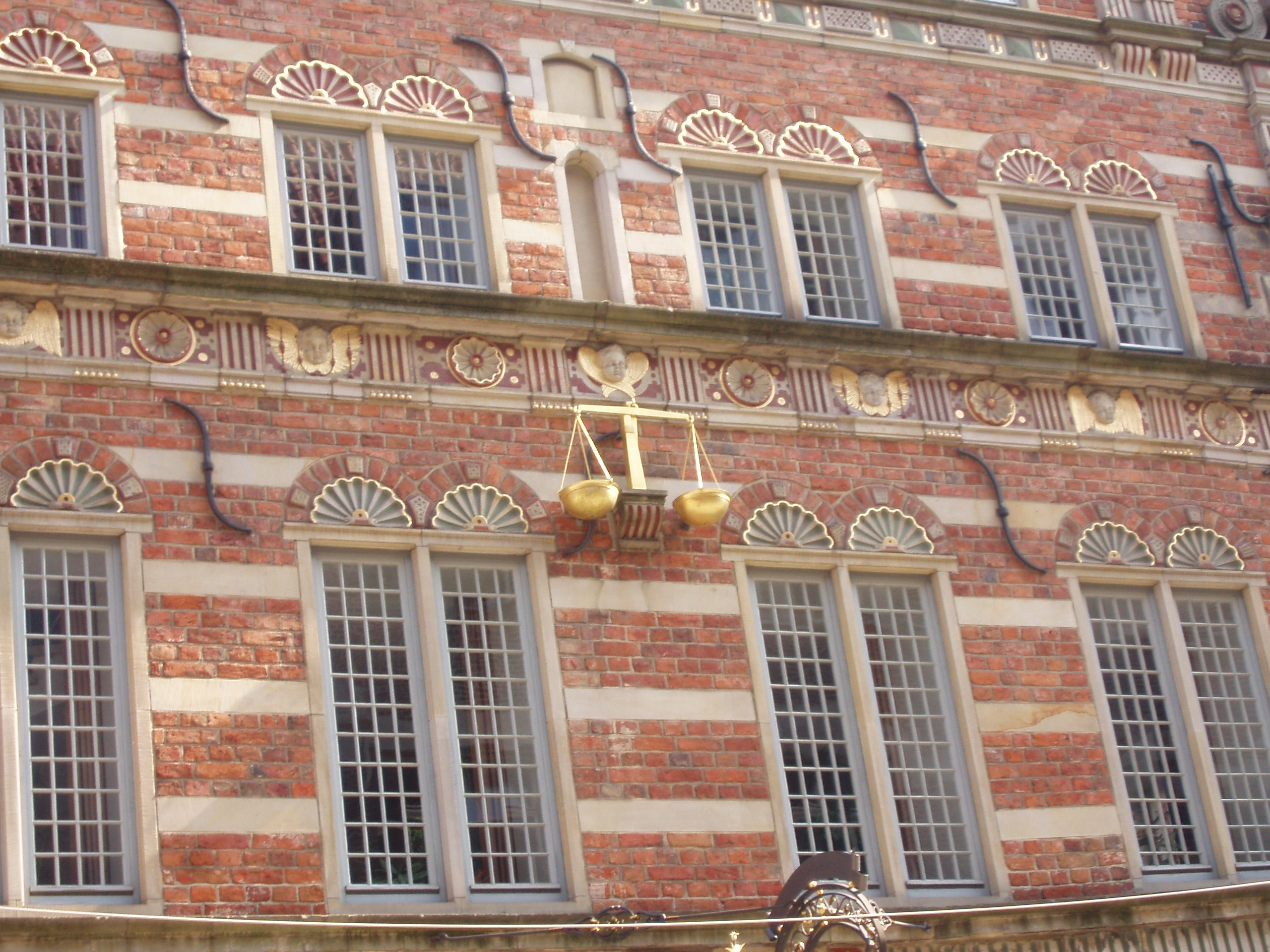
Details of the façade

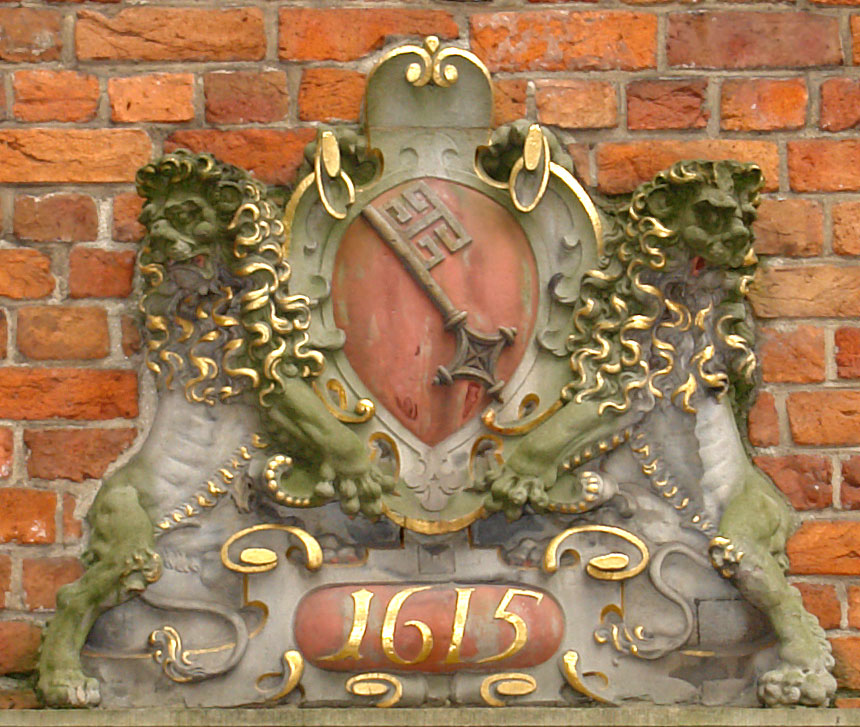
Bremen coat of arms

The Stadtwaage (weigh house) at No. 13 Langenstraße in Bremen (Germany) is the building in which the municipal weighing scales used to be housed. The facility was created in order to levy taxes and excise duties while protecting merchants and customers against fraud and dishonesty.

== Early history ==
A historical document from 1330 mentions a weigh house where all the merchants and tradesmen had to weigh their goods. From 1440 or even earlier, the building was situated in Langenstraße, one of the main Bremen thoroughfares. Between 1586 and 1588, a new building was erected on the same site by Lüder von Bentheim. Built of brick in the Weser Renaissance style, it was decorated with sandstone ornaments. Pilasters sprang up from each of the gable ledges while the windows were surmounted with shell-shaped ornaments. Above the second-storey window, there was a putto frieze depicting figures. A sign with a golden balance symbolised the building's role. From the street, the building was accessed through two round arches. The upper storeys consisted of storage rooms for the city council's grain reserves. The weigh house was in use well into the 18th century. From 1877, the tax and excise offices were housed in the building, together with the land-registry office until 1925. From 1927 until its destruction, the building was the headquarters of the first Bremen broadcasting station NORAG (Norddeutsche Rundfunk AG).

== Destruction and reconstruction ==
On 6 October 1944, apart from its outer walls, the building was completely destroyed. After the end of the Second World War, reconstruction was started and the gable reinforced. But in 1953, work was stopped as a result of disagreement on the design of the rear wall. In 1958, the Bremische Bürgerschaft finally decided not to continue with the reconstruction. Subsequently, with financial support from Sparkasse Bremen, the ruins were torn down and a new building was erected, maintaining the old gable. On the rear wall, a modern relief depicted the building's history. Since 1973, the weigh house has been listed as a historic monument.

== Present use ==
Owned by Sparkasse Bremen today's building is a cultural centre known as Kulturhaus Stadtwaage. It contains rooms for presentations, exhibitions, and receptions. Two cultural institutions, the Günter-Grass-Stiftung and the Deutsche Kammerphilharmonie Bremen, have their headquarters here.

== Literature ==
- Schwarzwälder, Herbert (2003). Das Große Bremen-Lexikon (in German). Edition Temmen. ISBN 3-86108-693-X.
