= Rathscafé (Bremen) =

Listed building in Bremen, Germany

Coordinates: 53°4′34.07″N 8°48′24.83″E

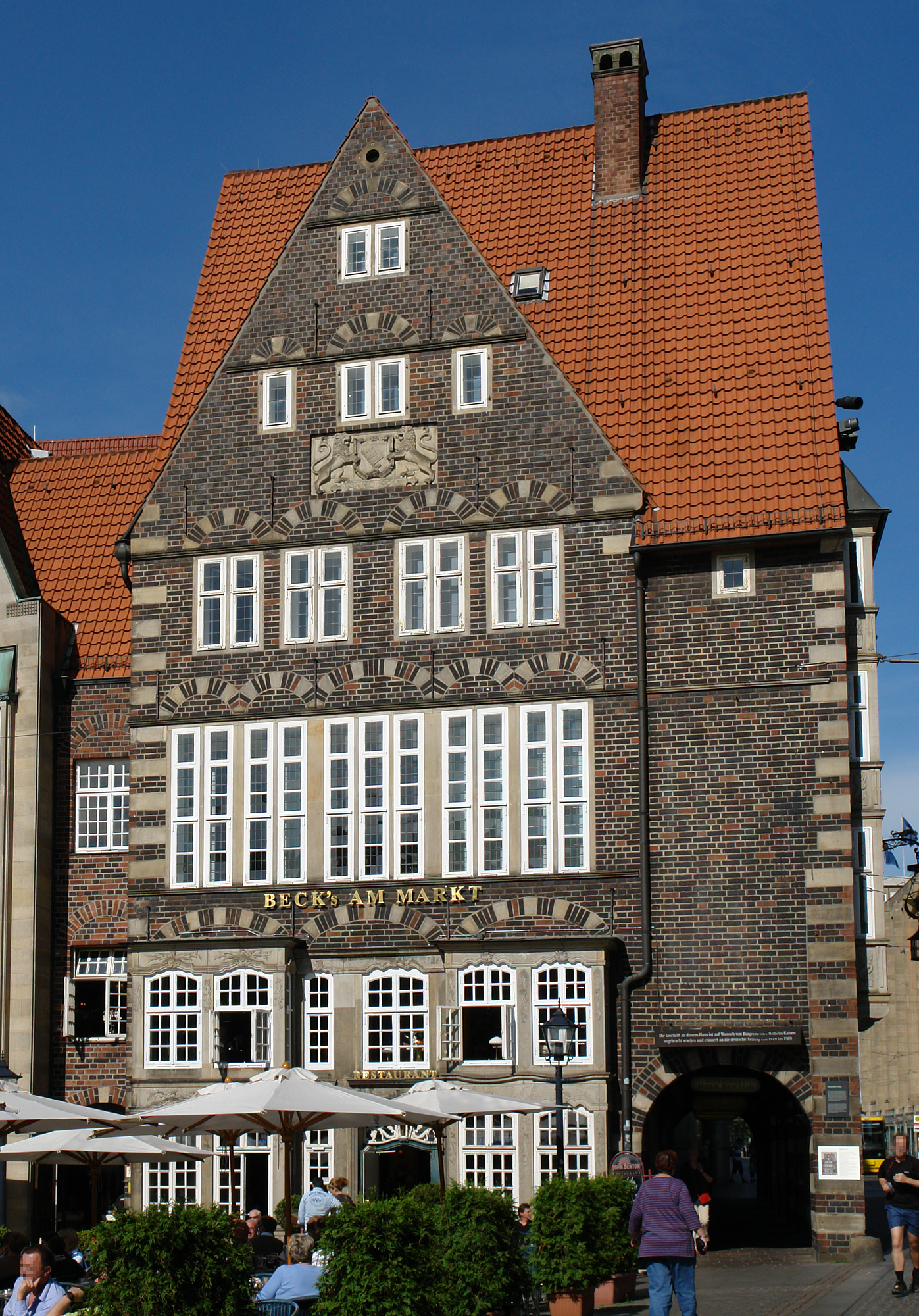
Deutsches Haus (2011)

The old Rathscafé (Town Council Café), now named Deutsches Haus, is a listed building on the market place (Marktplatz) in Bremen. It is part of the monument ensemble No. 1–21.

== History ==
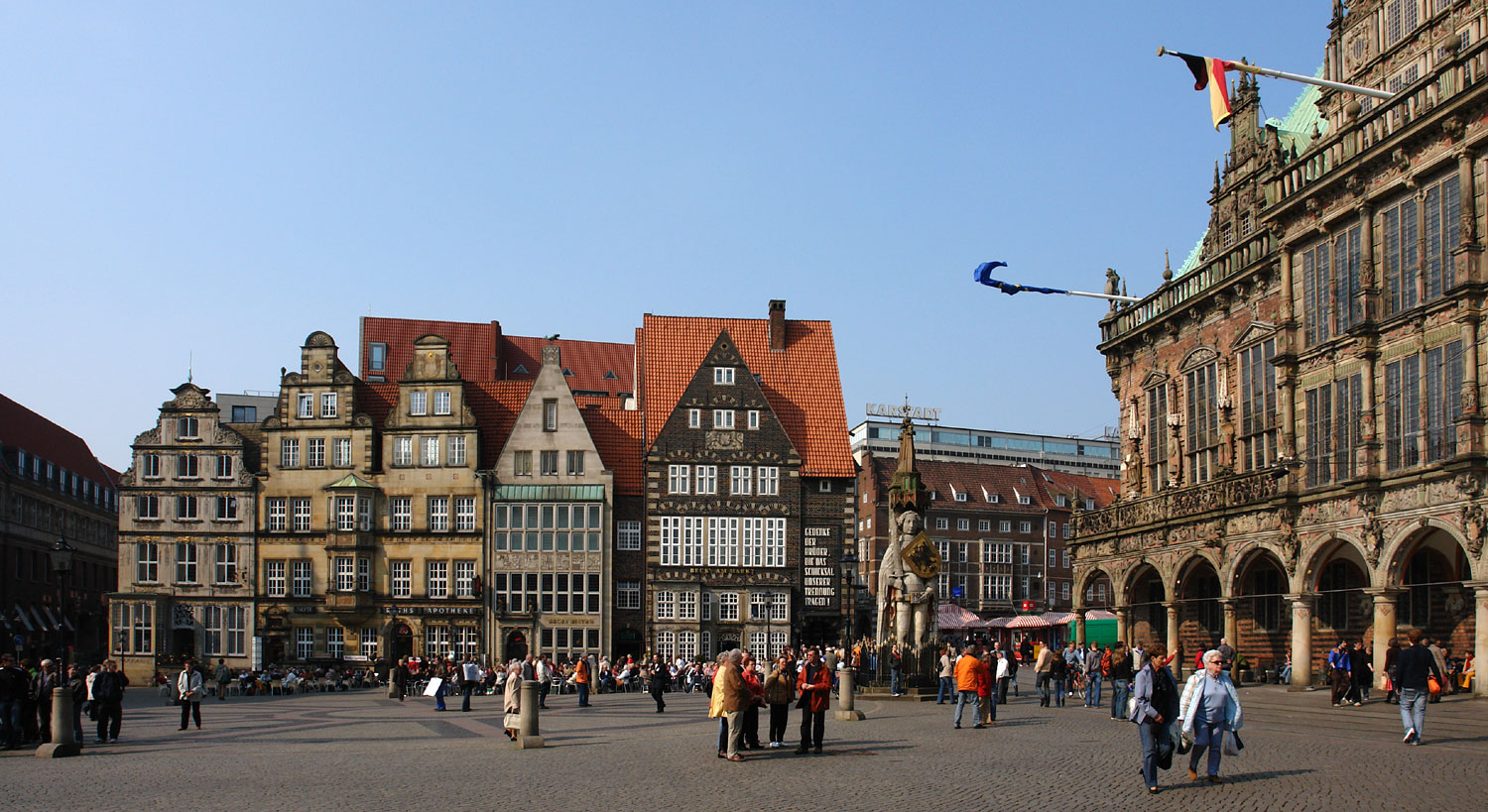
Marktplatz: Deutsches Haus at the north western (right) side, next to the right: Roland and Rathaus (townhall)

In the Middle Ages, a municipal wine-house was situated on the corner of Bremer Marktplatz/Liebfrauenkirchhof and Obernstrasse. Later on, the building was redecorated with a Renaissance gable. Until the 17th century, the building was used as a wine warehouse. Later on it passed into private ownership and was remodeled on several occasions. In 1900, it was used as a lingerie store. Thereafter, it was purchased by the city and demolished to provide space for a new building.

=== Rathscafé ===
As the building was situated in the immediate neighbourhood of the Town Hall, it was decided to launch an architectural competition to attract bids for its reconstruction from throughout Germany. The competition was won by the young Bremen architect Rudolf Jacobs. In accordance with his designs, it was reconstructed between 1909 and 1911 as a four-storey building with a saddle roof on the Marktplatz which at that time was called Kaiser-Wilhelm-Platz. Jacobs succeeded in creating a building which attracted expert attention. The building is an important component of the area's development given its relationship to the Marktplatz itself as well as to Unser-Lieben-Frauen-Kirchhof, the cemetery located opposite.

Built in the early 20th century, the building was inspired by the Heimatschutzarchitektur and Reformarchitektur trends, common in Germany at the time. Documenting the art and culture of the old town, the group of three gabled houses is decorated both outside and inside with items from excavations, collections and acquisitions. They include the freestone gable decorations, the 18th-century oriel windows, the portals and, inside the building, the 18th-century hallways.

=== Deutsches Haus ===
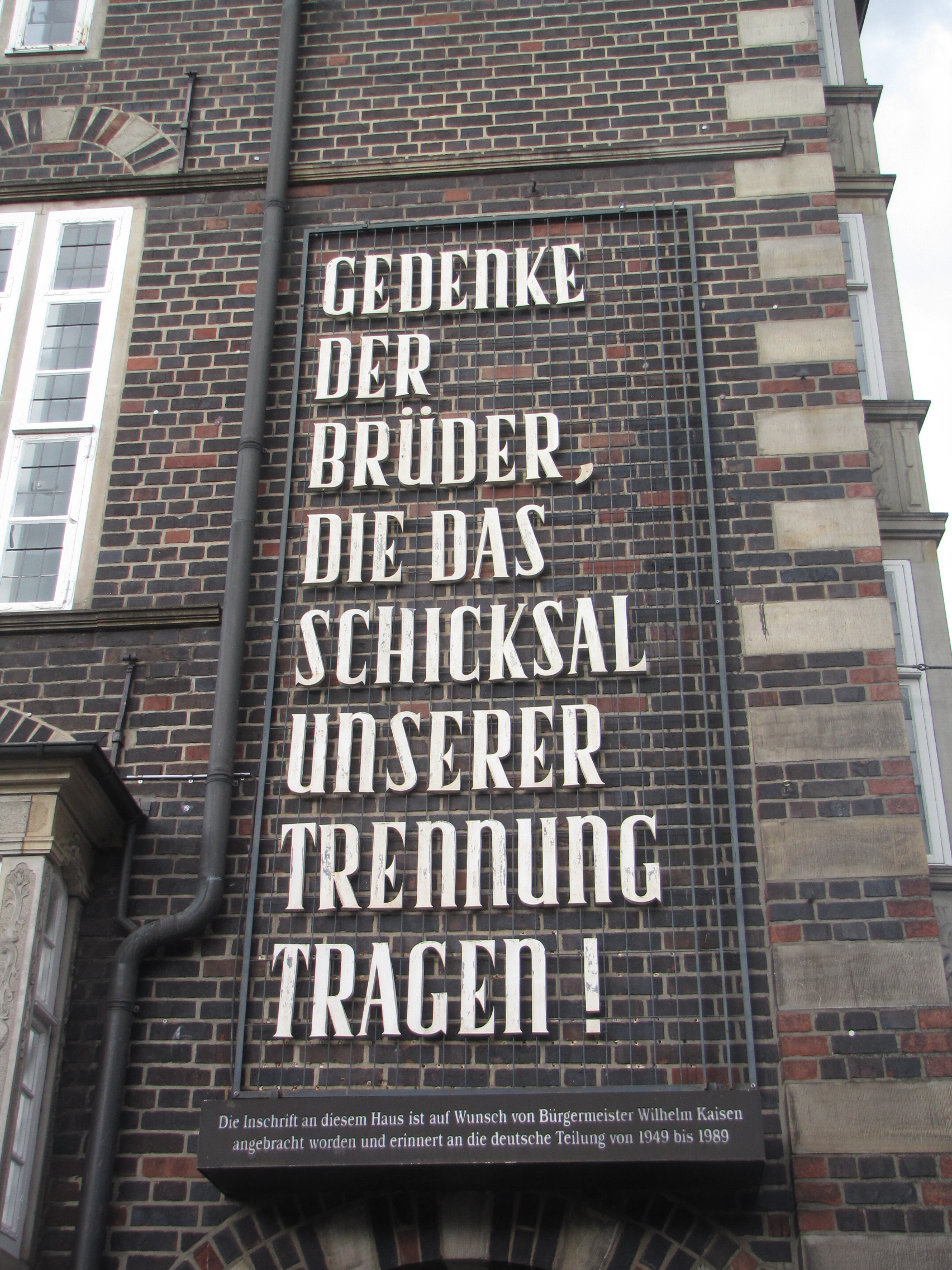
admonishing words of Wilhelm Kaisen

The corner house which had been destroyed during the Second World War was rebuilt by the construction firm Paul Kossel in accordance with the plans of the architect Herbert Anker, closely in line with the original building. After reconstruction, the former Rathscafé received the name of Deutsches Haus. Destruction and reconstruction are the central theme of the sandstone reliefs. The interior was changed more extensively in 1956 except for the hall of the house on the corner of Hakenstrasse which remained unchanged. It was fitted with a hall from the Stövesandt House on the Geeren, maintaining its original staircases, doors and parapets with their Acanthus carvings, all from 1740.

The rooms which previously were called „Marktdielen” (market hallways) were now called „Bürgerstuben” (citizens' rooms) whereas some rooms maintained the name of „Rathsstuben” (council rooms). The „Deutsche Bruderhilfe” (an organisation that distributed West German donations to the citizens of the German Democratic Republic) had its office in the building. In 1995, the group of buildings to which the „Haus am Markt” belonged was completely revitalised by the Bremen architect Christian Bockholt (office BPG). The restaurant rooms in the upper floor which were no longer needed were converted, inter alia, into office floorspaces and apartments. The rooms of „Industrie-Club Bremen e.V.” were renewed at that time and completely modernised, once again, in 2008. The building belongs to the Körber-foundation since 2007. The restaurant at the lower floor houses the restaurant „Beck's am Markt”.

An Inscription in large letters

„Remember the brothers bearing the fate of our separation”,

admonishing words of Wilhelm Kaisen, was attached to the market side in 1955. In March 2011, the inscription was given as a loan for one year to an exhibition in the Haus der Geschichte (house of history) in Bonn.

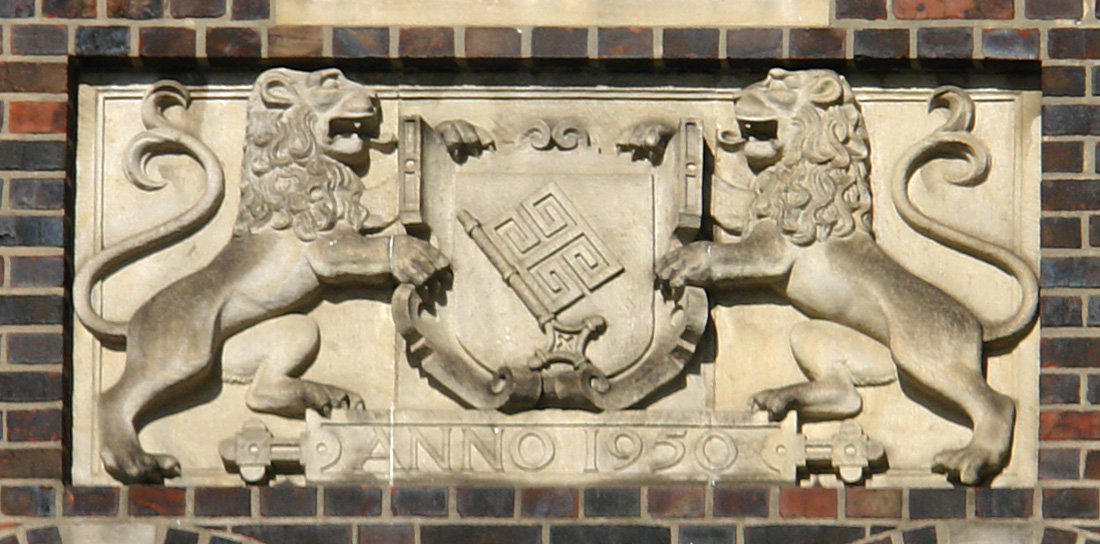
Coat of arms at the market gable

The coat of arms at the gable is a reproduction of an old original sculpture of the Bremen State Great Coat of Arms at the Rickmers' estate in Horn.

=== Reused Components of other buildings ===
The following components of other demolished houses of Bremen citizens were reused at the Rathscafé: the late Renaissance front gate of about 1660 from Hakenstrasse 1 was used in 1909; at the market side, the oriel windows of the houses Tiefer No. 35 (right side) and Hinterm Schütting No. 8 (left side); the oriel of the corner house Pelzerstrasse No. 6 and Brill no. 8; the oriels of the middle house of Balgebrückstrasse No. 33; the gable of the corner house of Hakenstrasse was taken from Wachtstrasse No. 17 after the said house had been demolished in 1894.

== Monument protection ==
In 1973, the Rathscafé, today named Deutsches Haus, was designated a historic monument. The building ensemble at the north side of the market place consists of four buildings, from right to left:

- No. 1 Rathscafé/Deutsches Haus, 1908-1911 and 1951-1956
- No. 9 Haus zum Jonas, 1600 and 1963
- No. 11 Raths-Apotheke, 1893-1894 and 1959-1960
- No. 12 Haus der Stadtsparkasse, 1755 and 1957-1958
