= Suding & Soeken building, Bremen =

Building in Bremen, Germany

Coordinates: 53°04′37″N 8°48′09″E

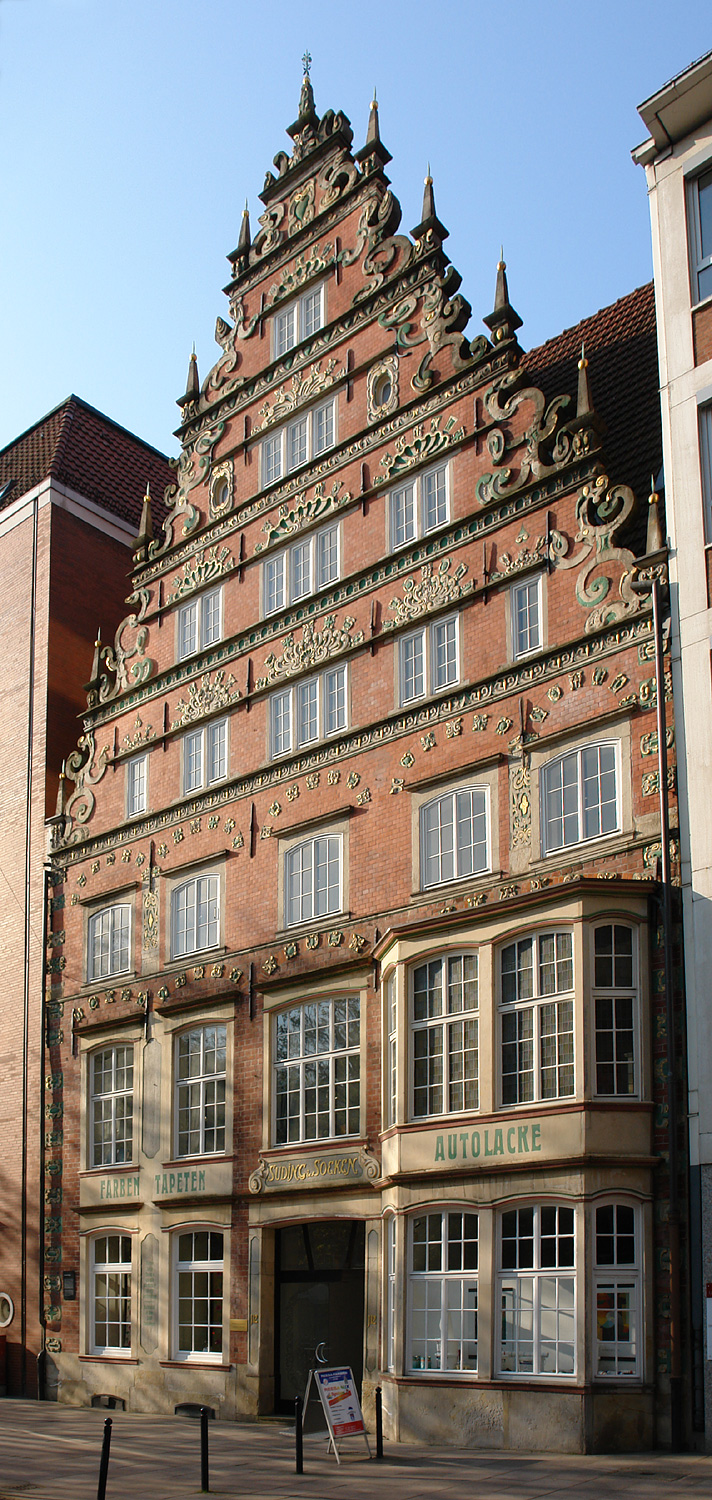
The Suding and Soeken building on Bremen's Langenstraße

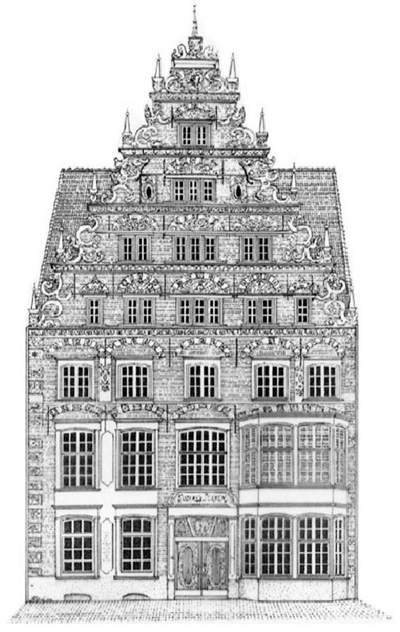
The facade in 1901

The Suding & Soeken building (German: Kontorhaus Suding und Soeken) is a gabled house at No. 28 Langenstraße in Bremen, Germany. Referred to as a Kaufmannshaus or Kontorhaus, it is one of the city's few historic merchant houses to survive the war undamaged. It is noted for its projecting Renaissance bay window and its two-tiered Baroque stairway ascending from the hallway.

== Background ==
Langenstraße is one of Bremen's oldest streets and it was first mentioned in 1234. The thoroughfare is one of the most important for Bremen's merchants. It originated at the time when the first settlements grew up on the north bank of the Balge. It runs west from the Marktplatz parallel to the River Weser over Bürgermeister-Smidt-Straße to Geeren. The Suding & Soeken building is located on the south side of the street, just west of Martinistraße.

== History and architecture ==
Constructed around 1630, the house at No. 28 (it was earlier No. 112) is one of the best preserved buildings of its kind in the city. Designed at the height of Bremen's development in the Weser Renaissance style, its bay window on the facade was added during alterations in about 1730. Used for centuries as both a residence and for the storage of goods, the building has a large entrance hall with a two-tiered Baroque staircase, the only one of its kind that has remained in place in Bremen. The building was changed internally in 1902 after the paint company moved into the building. The Suding & Soeken building is one of Bremen's few historic merchant houses to remain undamaged after the second world war. Since 1973, it has been a listed building. The building has an information plaque with a QRpedia code that links to the English Wikipedia article about the building.

== Suding & Soeken ==
The paint retailing company Suding & Soeken moved into the building in 1901, thirteen years after the company was founded by Ludwig Heinrich Suding und Johann Frerich Soeken in 1888. From 1922, the company's products were sold under the name "Reesa". It still occupies the office building on Langenstraße, although the company has since opened branches in Kassel, Neumünster, Magdeburg, Meißen and Erfurt.

== Literature ==
- Herbert Schwarzwälder: Das Große Bremen-Lexikon. Edition Temmen, Bremen, 2003, ISBN 3-86108-693-X (in German)
- Rudolf Stein: Romanische, Gotische und Renaissance-Baukunst in Bremen, Hauschild, Bremen 1962 (in German)
- Rudolf Stein: Das Bürgerhaus in Bremen. Ernst Wasmuth, Tübingen 1970 (in German)
- Weidinger, Ulrich (1997). Mit Koggen zum Marktplatz – Bremens Hafenstrukturen vom frühen Mittelalter bis zum Beginn der Industrialisierung (in German). Hauschild Verlag, Bremen. ISBN 3-931785-09-2.
