= Haus der Stadtsparkasse (Bremen) =

Coordinates: 53°4′33.15″N 8°48′23.45″E

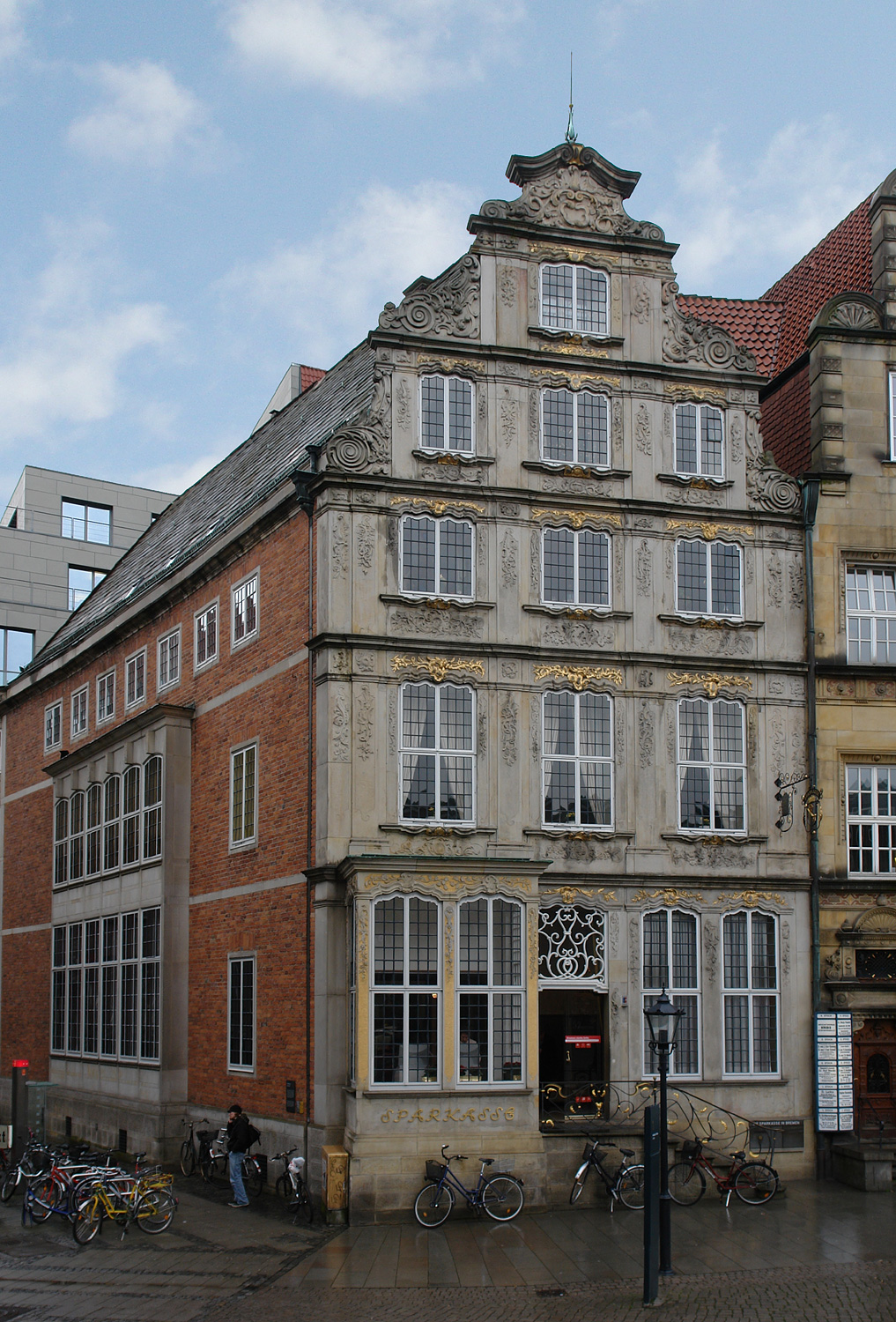
Haus der Stadtsparkasse

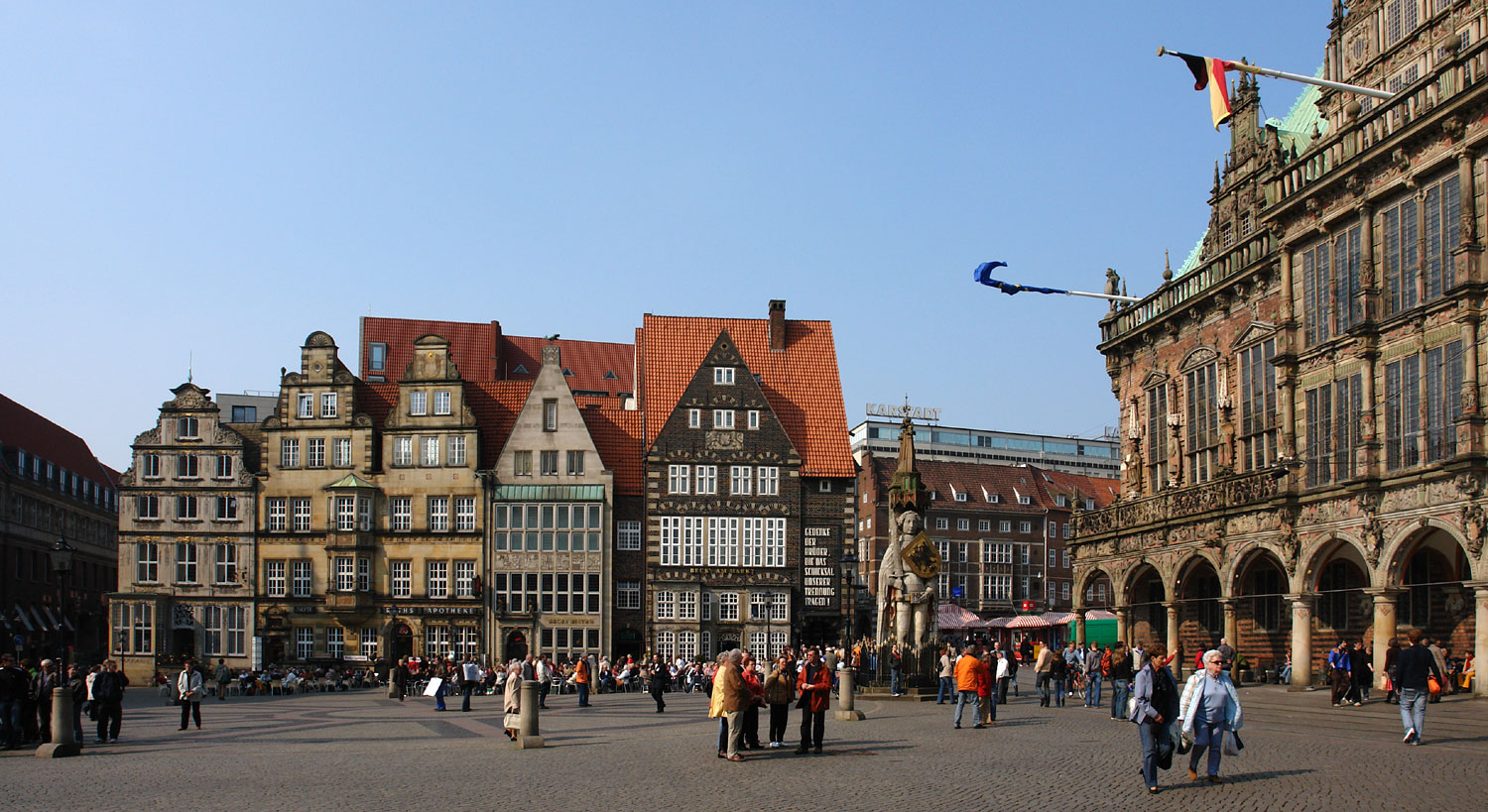
Market place: Sparkasse (left corner), Town Hall of Bremen (right)

Haus der Stadtsparkasse (Stadtsparkasse Building) is a Rococo landmark on the "Marktplatz" (Market Square) in Bremen, Germany. It was completed in the 1950s combining the historic front gable from another site with the more recent architecture of the remainder of the building.

== History ==
In 1755, Johann Georg Hoffschlaeger, a wine merchant and city counsellor, had a house built on a site now designated as No. 31B, An der Schlachte. The stonemason Theophilus Wilhelm Frese (1696–1763) decorated the façade in the Rococo style, with a bow window and a gable topped with a wig.

In 1836, the building was bought by Georg Friedrich Pflüger who used it as an inn named Stadt Paris (City of Paris). In 1875, the property was taken over by Carl Wilhelm Meyer, a publicly appointed sampler. In the early 20th century, a new building designed by Albert Dunkel maintained the Rococo façade.

The building was destroyed in the second world war by an airstrike with incendiary bombs in 1944. Rudolf Stein, who later became Bremen's monument conservator, saved some of the debris including the façade. In 1957/58, the building was reconstructed on a new site on the corner of Langenstraße and Marktplatz. After a call for tenders, it was designed by the architect Eberhard Gildemeister (1897–1978) assisted by the sculptors Maria Ewel and Ingeborg Ahner-Siese. They used original building elements from the façade of the Schlachte building, adhering to the original style. Eberhard successfully combined the building's red-bricked lateral walls with the historic façade. The interior, however, was finished essentially in the style of the 1950s. A notable design feature is the new door with a skylight on the market side. The internal decoration, too, contains many Baroque elements.

Today, the building houses a branch office of the Sparkasse, a municipal savings bank.

== Heritage listing ==
In 1973, the building was listed as a historic monument. The ensemble on the north side of the Market Place consists of four buildings, from right to left:

- No. 1 Rathscafé/Deutsches Haus, 1908-1911 and 1951-1956
- No. 9 Haus zum Jonas, 1600 and 1963
- No. 11 Raths-Apotheke, 1893-1894 and 1959-1960
- No. 12 Haus der Stadtsparkasse, 1755 and 1957-1958
