= Raths-Apotheke (Bremen) =

Listed building in Bremen, Germany

Coordinates: 53°4′33.56″N 8°48′24.04″E

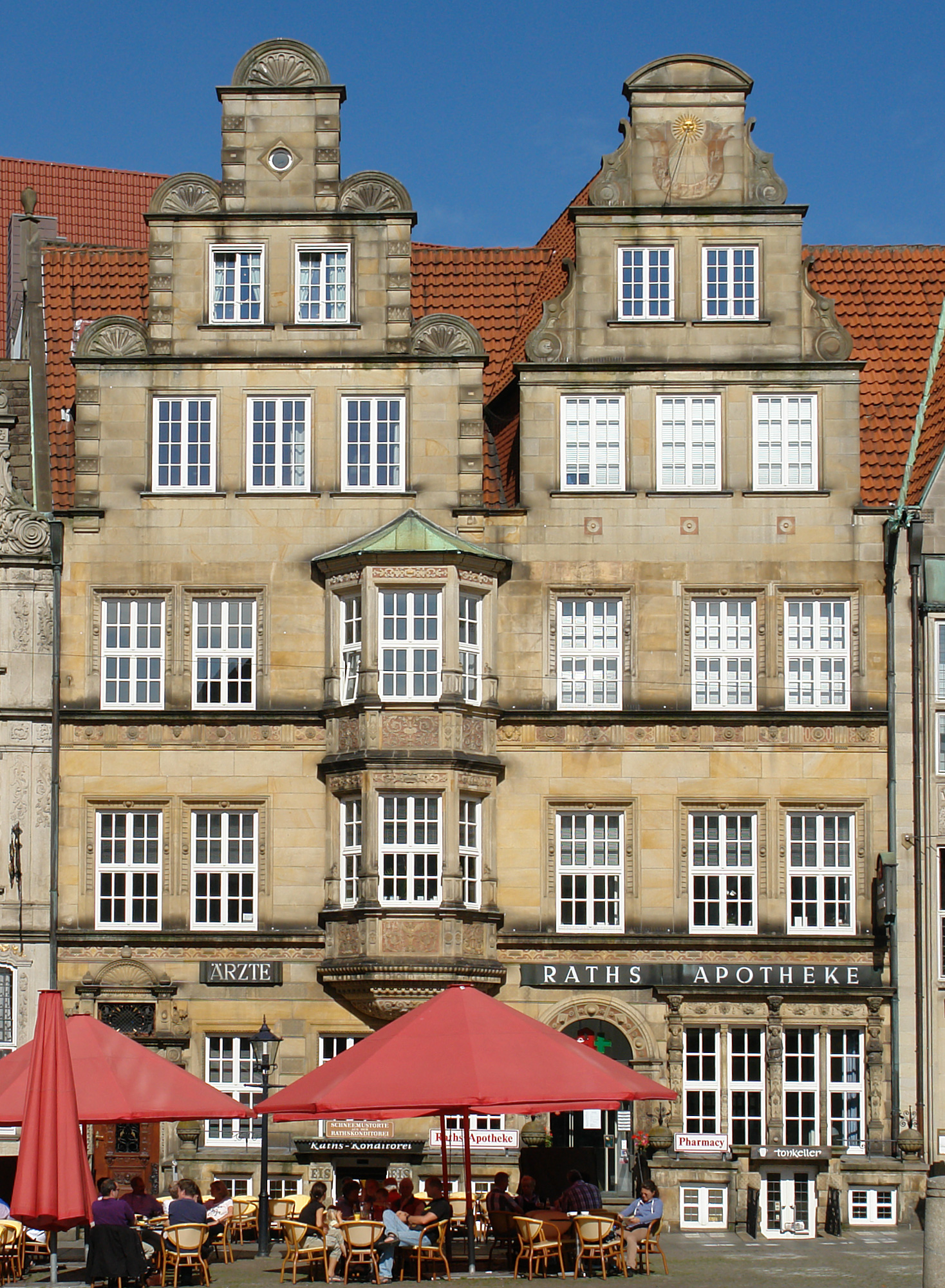
Raths-Apotheke

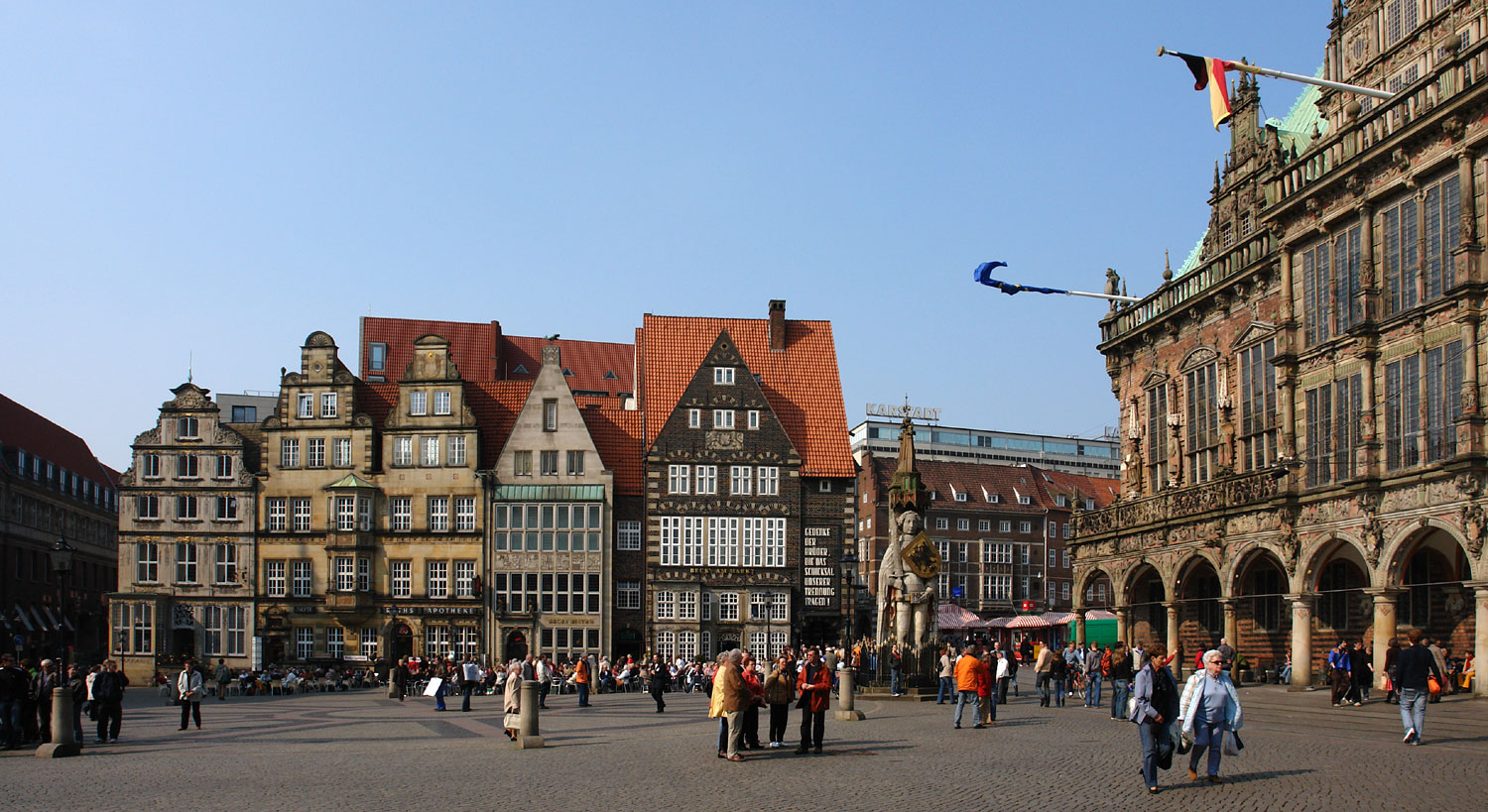
Marktplatz: Raths-Apotheke middle/left at the north west side. Right side: Roland and Rathaus (town hall)

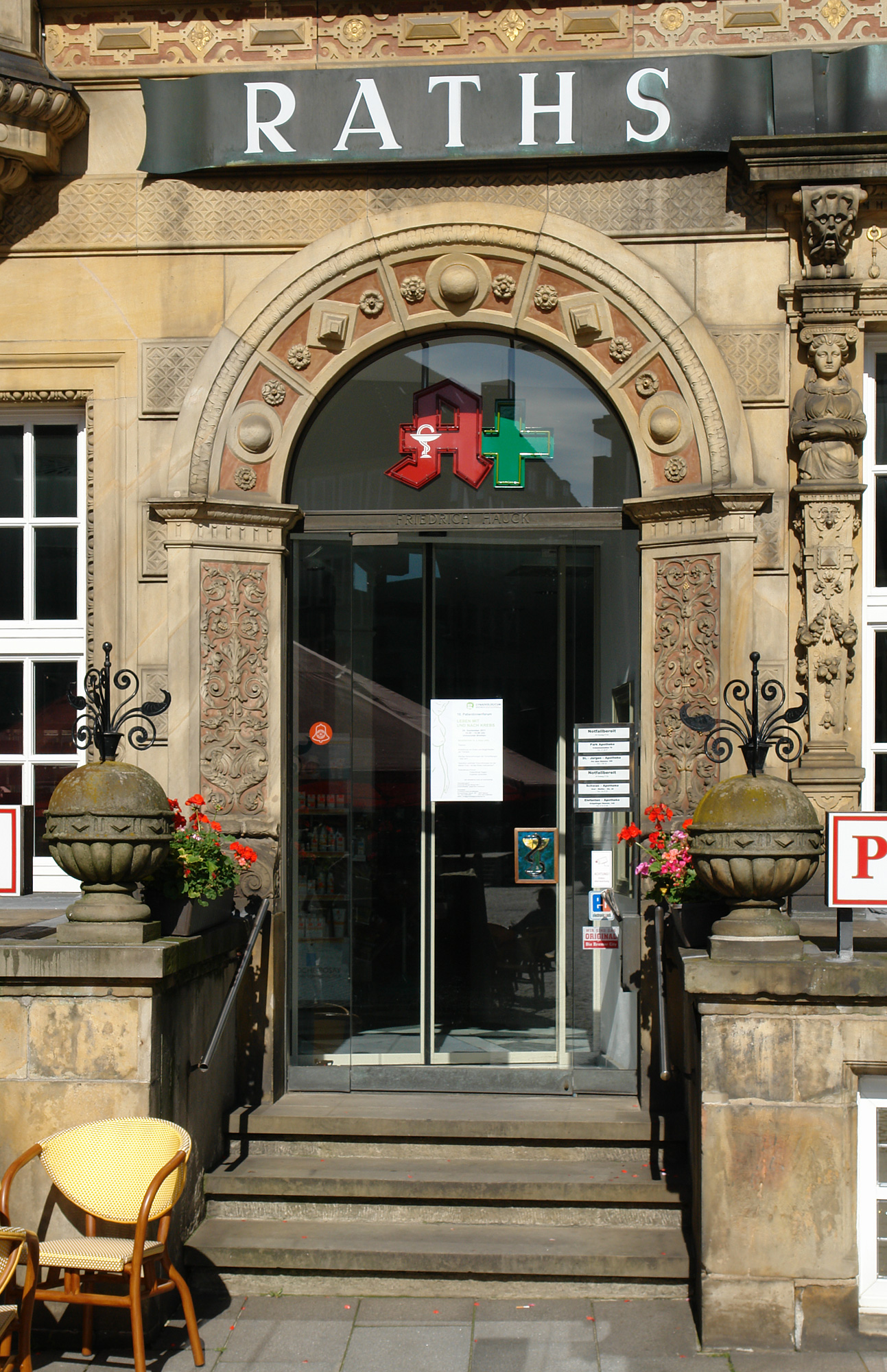
Entrance door of Raths-Apotheke

The Raths-Apotheke (literally: Council Apothecary) is a listed building on the Market Square (Marktplatz) in Bremen, Germany. After suffering war damage, the building was restored with two gables in the Neobaroque style in 1958, re-establishing the square's sequence of gabled buildings dating from the 1820s.

== History ==
There has been a Raths-Apotheke in Bremen since 1510. The exact location of the original building is not known but it was probably situated in Sögestrasse. It is first mentioned in a document from 1 October 1532 in which the city requires the pharmacist to sell his wares at fair prices. The pharmacist received his income from the city council. From the 17th century, the council leased the pharmacy for 10 years at a time, later for life. The supervision was ensured by the third mayor and by a councillor.

From 1594 to 1820, two beautiful three-storey gabled buildings in the Weser Renaissance style stood of the site of today's Raths-Apotheke. Differing in height and width, they had been designed by Lüder von Bentheim, one with two bays, the other with three. They housed the apothecary and the excise office. The apothecary itself had a tall triangular gable with pyramids on either side. In the 17th century, additional pharmacies were established in Bremen: the "Einhorn-Apotheke" in 1640, and the "Hirsch-Apotheke" and the "Apotheke zur weißen Rose" in 1667.

In August 1815, the city council sold the Raths-Apotheke property to Jacob Henschen, the licensee. In 1824, Henschen demolished the buildings which had fallen into disrepair. Around 1830, a new plain three-storey building was erected in the Neoclassical style practised by Biedermeier. Standing in the northwest corner of the Marktplatz, the rendered building looked strange and out of character. In 1893, it was seriously damaged by a fire but the owner, Friedrich Hauck, could not afford to have it repaired.

A lively public discussion took place, involving the Bürgerschaft of Bremen (city parliament). It became generally accepted that as the market place was close to the hearts of the citizens, its appearance had to be maintained. As a result, the cathedral architect, Max Salzman, submitted plans for a new façade. Built of yellow Silesian marble, the German Renaissance building was completed in 1894. Its central gable and the oriels on the first and second floors drew out its vertical lines. To cover the additional costs of a building designed to enhance the cityscape, the owner received a subsidy of 15,000 marks from the city and a donation of 10,000 marks from Franz Schütte who had been successful in the oil-import business.

On 6 October 1944, the interior of the building was destroyed by incendiary bombs but the ground floor and the façade with the oriels were left intact. After the war, the lower two storeys of the building were repaired but it was only in 1958 that restoration was completed. Planned by Herbert Anker, instead of a single central gable, there were now two Neobaroque gables. The work re-established the ensemble of gabled buildings on the Marktplatz from 1830. As the oriels on the first and second floor had originally been designed as features of a single gable, their removal was contemplated but rejected. The roof cover of the oriel which had originally been cupola-shaped was replaced by a sloping copper-covered roof. There is a sundial on the right gable, one of Bremen's 125 sundials.

The left entrance provides access to a medical centre while the Raths-Apotheke occupies the right half of the building.

== Heritage listings ==
In 1973, the Raths-Apotheke was listed under the Monument Act. The ensemble on the north-western side of the Marktplatz consists of the following four buildings (from right to left):

- Am Markt 1: Rathscafé/Deutsches Haus, 1908–1911
- Am Markt 9: Haus Zum Jonas, built 1600, rebuilt 1963
- Am Markt 11: Raths-Apotheke, built 1893–1894, rebuilt 1959–1960
- Am Markt 12: Sparkasse am Markt, 1755, reconstructed 1958

== Literature ==
- Funke-Johannsen, Silke (2013). 150 Jahre Remberti-Apotheke: Die wechselvolle Geschichte einer Bremer Apotheke von 1863 - 2013 (in German). BoD – Books on Demand. ISBN 978-3-939564-47-8.
- Kohl, Johann Georg (2012) [1871]. Episoden aus der Geschichte der Stadt Bremen (in German). BoD – Books on Demand. pp. 115–. ISBN 978-3-95507-782-2.
- Schwarzwälder, Herbert (2003). Das Große Bremen-Lexikon (in German). Edition Temmen. ISBN 3-86108-693-X.
