= Essighaus =

Coordinates: 53°4′35″N 8°48′18″E

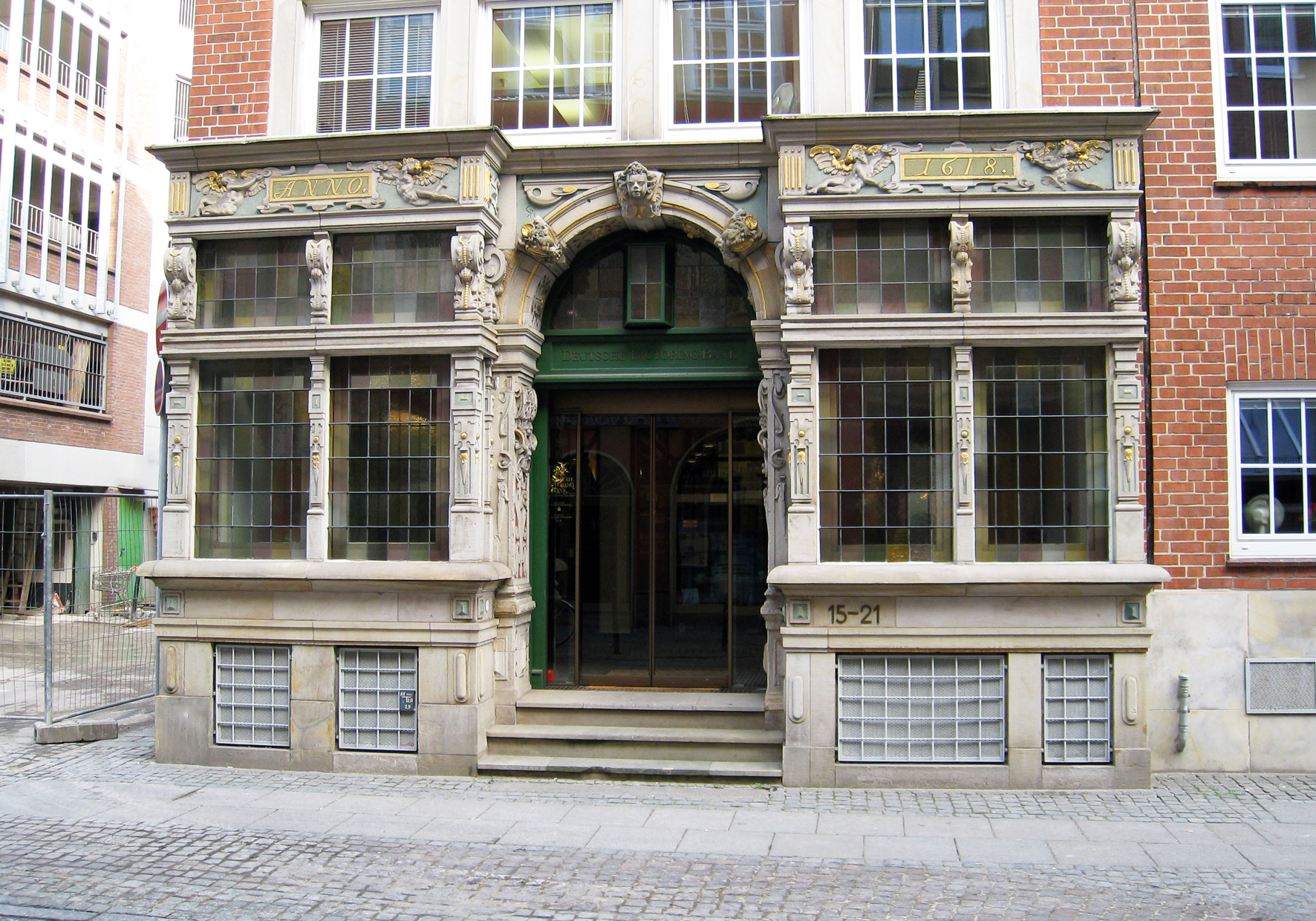
The restored ground floor facade of the Essighaus

The Essighaus was an impressive gabled town house in the old town of Bremen in northern Germany. One of the city's finest examples of Renaissance architecture, it was almost completely destroyed by bombing in 1943. The entrance flanked by projecting bay windows is the only part of the building which has been restored.

== History ==
The house was built in 1618 in the ornate Renaissance style. With its richly decorated facade and interior, it was known well beyond the bounds of the city. Located on Langenstraße in the city's Schlachte district, the building takes its name from a vinegar factory (German Essig means vinegar) on the property at the beginning of the 19th century, but it may also be a corruption of Esich-Haus, as the Esich family originally lived there. Combining living quarters, an office and a shop, it was typical of Bremen's old merchants' houses. In 1897, a wine bar called the "Alt-Bremer Haus" opened on the premises. The Bremen branch of the East Asian Company was founded there by local merchants in 1901. Essighaus was the location of a fainting spell by Sigmund Freud in 1909. This was not seen as a minor event by his student Carl Jung who saw it as evidence of the psychoanalyst's own neurosis.

== Rebuilding ==
In 1956, after suffering serious war damage, the house was rebuilt by the architects Wilhelm Wortmann and Erik Schott who restored the lower facade from the remains. Following conversion work in 1985, the building now belongs to the Deutsche Factoring Bank. Since 1973, it has been listed as a heritage monument. A plaque on the building records the history of the building and the grander Kornhaus building which was next door before it was destroyed in the war.

== Literature ==
- Stein, Rudolf (1970). Das Bürgerhaus in Bremen (in German). Wasmuth. ISBN 9783803000149.
