= Deutsche Kammerphilharmonie Bremen =

Chamber orchestra in Bremen, Germany

- Chamber orchestra
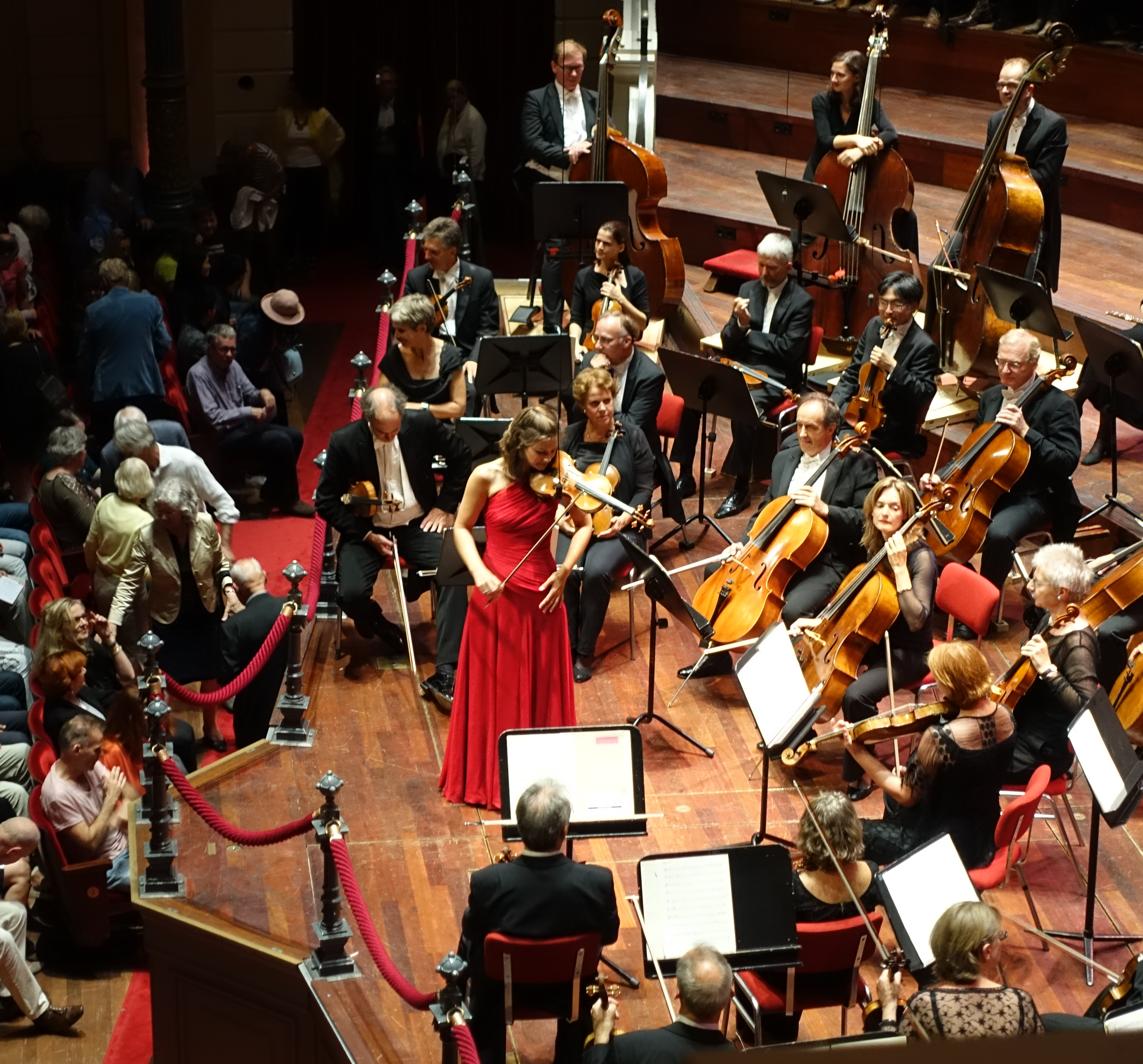
- Janine Jansen with the Deutsche Kammerphilharmonie Bremen in Concertgebouw (Amsterdam), 2017
- Founded: 1980
- Website: www.kammerphilharmonie.com

The Deutsche Kammerphilharmonie Bremen (unofficial English translation: Bremen German Chamber Philharmonic) is a chamber orchestra based in Bremen, Germany, with place of residence in the historical building Stadtwaage.

== History ==
A group of music students founded the orchestra in 1980 in Frankfurt, initially as an ensemble which the musicians own solely and without a conductor. The musicians assume responsibility for financial as well as artistic management. About 40% of the organisation's costs come from German governmental authorities. They have worked with researchers at the University of Saarbrücken to develop a management tool, the "5 Seconds Model".

Notable early concerts included a 1983 appearance at the United Nations and performances with Gidon Kremer at the Lockenhaus Festival in 1984 and 1985. The orchestra acquired professional status in 1987, and moved to Bremen in 1992. An offshoot group, the Wind Soloists of the Deutsche Kammerphilharmonie Bremen has been an established ensemble since 1990. In Bremen, the orchestra presents two subscription series, special concerts, two chamber music series, and an open-air festival 'Summer in Lesmona'. The orchestra has been the orchestra-in-residence at the Bremen Music Festival since 1998 and at the International Beethovenfest in Bonn since 2005. Beginning in 2017 the Deutsche Kammerphilharmonie Bremen is the orchestra-in-residence at the Kissinger Sommer festival.

Past conductors who have served as either principal guest conductors or artistic directors have included Mario Venzago, Heinrich Schiff, Jiří Bělohlávek, and Thomas Hengelbrock. Daniel Harding was music director of the orchestra from 1999 to 2003. Paavo Järvi has served as the orchestra's artistic leader since 2004.

The Deutsche Kammerphilharmonie Bremen has recorded a number of Compact Discs for such labels as Deutsche Grammophon, Teldec, EMI Classics, BMG, Virgin Classics, Decca, Berlin Classics, Chandos Records, and PENTATONE.
