= Eberhard Gildemeister =

German architect

Eberhard Gildemeister (1897–1978) was a German architect who was mainly active in Bremen. In addition to a number of churches and residential buildings, he designed the Sparkasse building on Bremen's market square.

== Early life ==
Born in Bremen, Gildemeister was the fourth son of the successful architect Eduard Gildemeister. After serving in the army from 1915 to 1918, he studied architecture at the Darmstadt University of Technology.

== Career ==
When 30, he joined the practice of Rudolph Jacobs. The following year (1928), together with his brother Hermann Gildemeister, he won a competition for designing the Haus des Reichs, still one of Bremen's largest office buildings. Considered to have a "festive" appearance, it was completed in 1931. From 1932 to 1939, the Gildemeisters designed a number of residential buildings.

After the war, in addition to housing, Gildemeister built six churches including the delicately proportioned St Rimbert Church (Rimbertikirche, 1951) after its predecessor was destroyed during the war. He also participated in designing the Sparkasse am Markt after the building on the Schlachte had been destroyed. Towards the end of his life, he designed an extension to Kunsthalle Bremen.

Other Bremen buildings designed by Gildemeister include:

- Methodistische Erlöserkirche (1950)
- Landhäuser auf dem Lehnhof (1951)
- Emmaus Church, attached to the Diakonissenkrankenhaus, Gröpelingen (1961)
- St Magnus Church (1967)
