= Rudolf Jacobs =

German architect

Heinrich Rudolf Jacobs (1879–1946) was a German architect who was active in Bremen. Although much of his work was destroyed in the war, the facade of the post office building next to the station still stands. He is also remembered for his work on the Bremer Marktplatz, traces of which remain in the Rathscafé.

== Biography ==
Born in Elberfeld, after completing his studies as an architect he moved to Bremen at the beginning of the 20th century when, thanks to the city's prosperity, many new buildings were being planned. In 1905, Jacobs won a competition for the construction of a building on the market place, now known as the Rathscafé. It was successfully completed in 1911 in the Reform architecture style. As a result of his success, he was commissioned to design various other buildings in the city. The Park House in the Bürgerpark was completed in 1913 but was destroyed in the war. The same year, he designed the Lloyd-Bahnhof in Findorff-Bürgerweide which still stands today. He went on to design the post office at the railway station (Postamt 5) which has become one of Bremen's landmarks. Considered a jewel of the interwar period, it was completed in 1926.

Jacobs died in Bremen in 1946 after a short but serious illness.

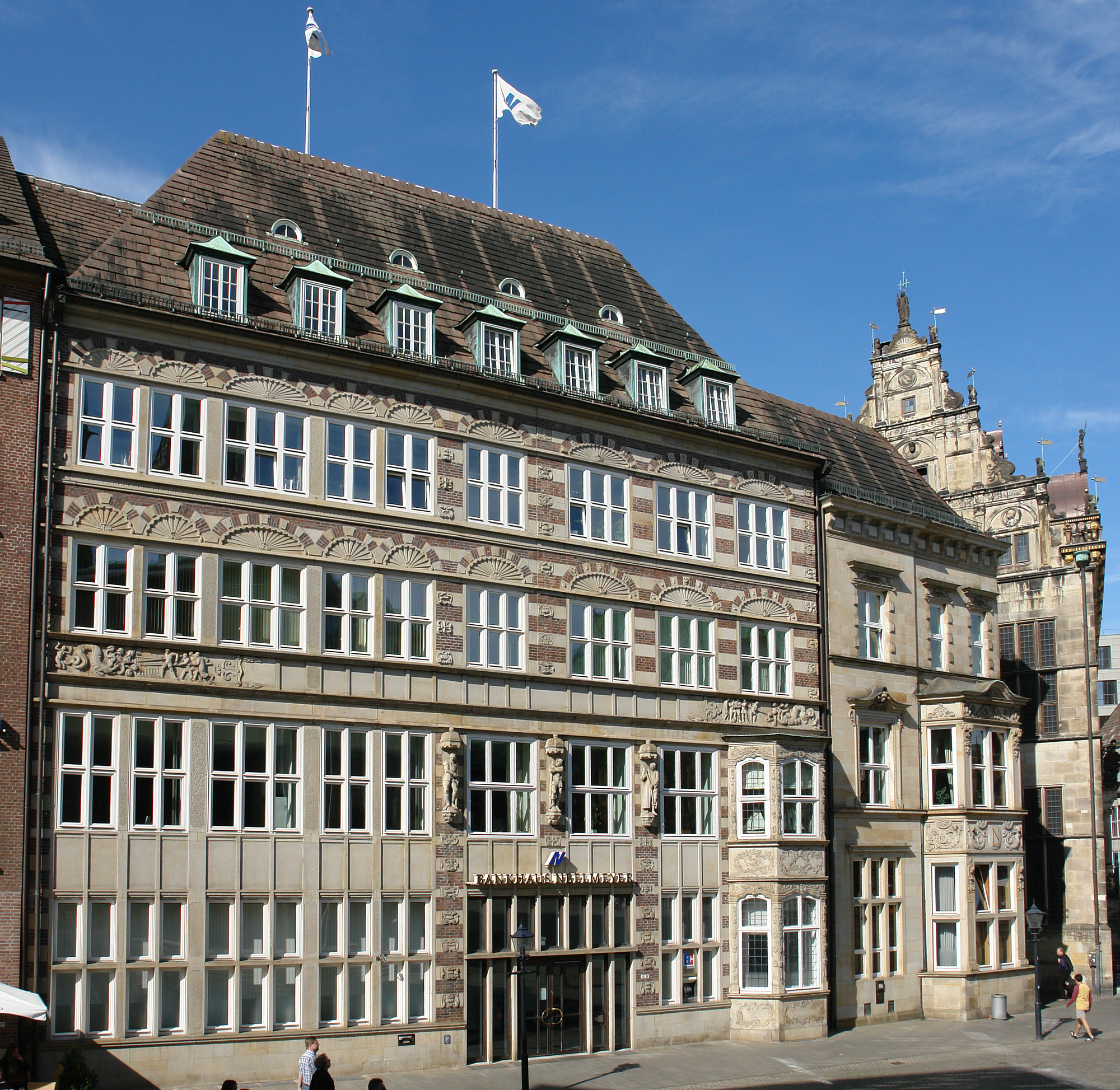
Bankhaus Neelmeyer

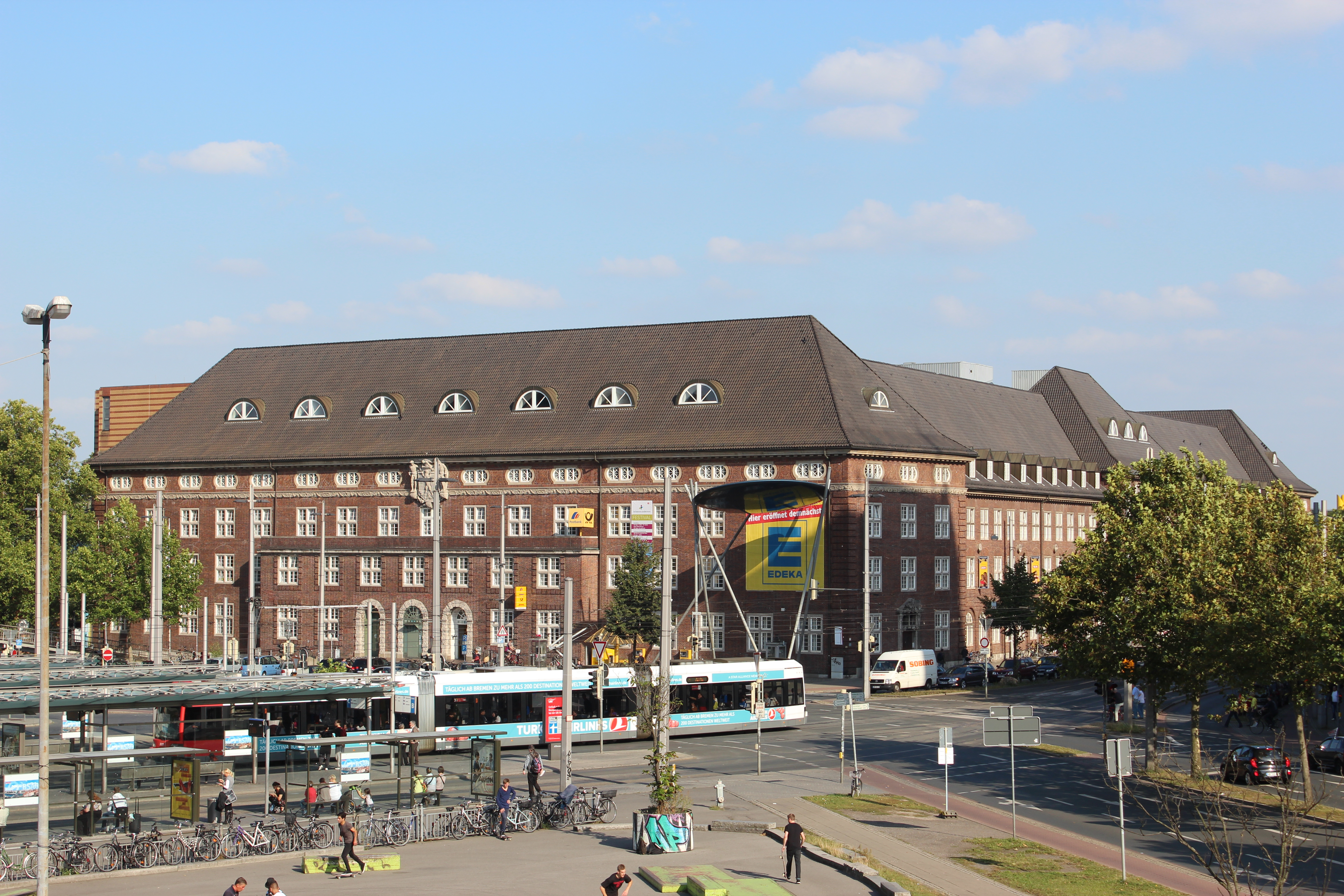
Station post office building (Postamt 5)

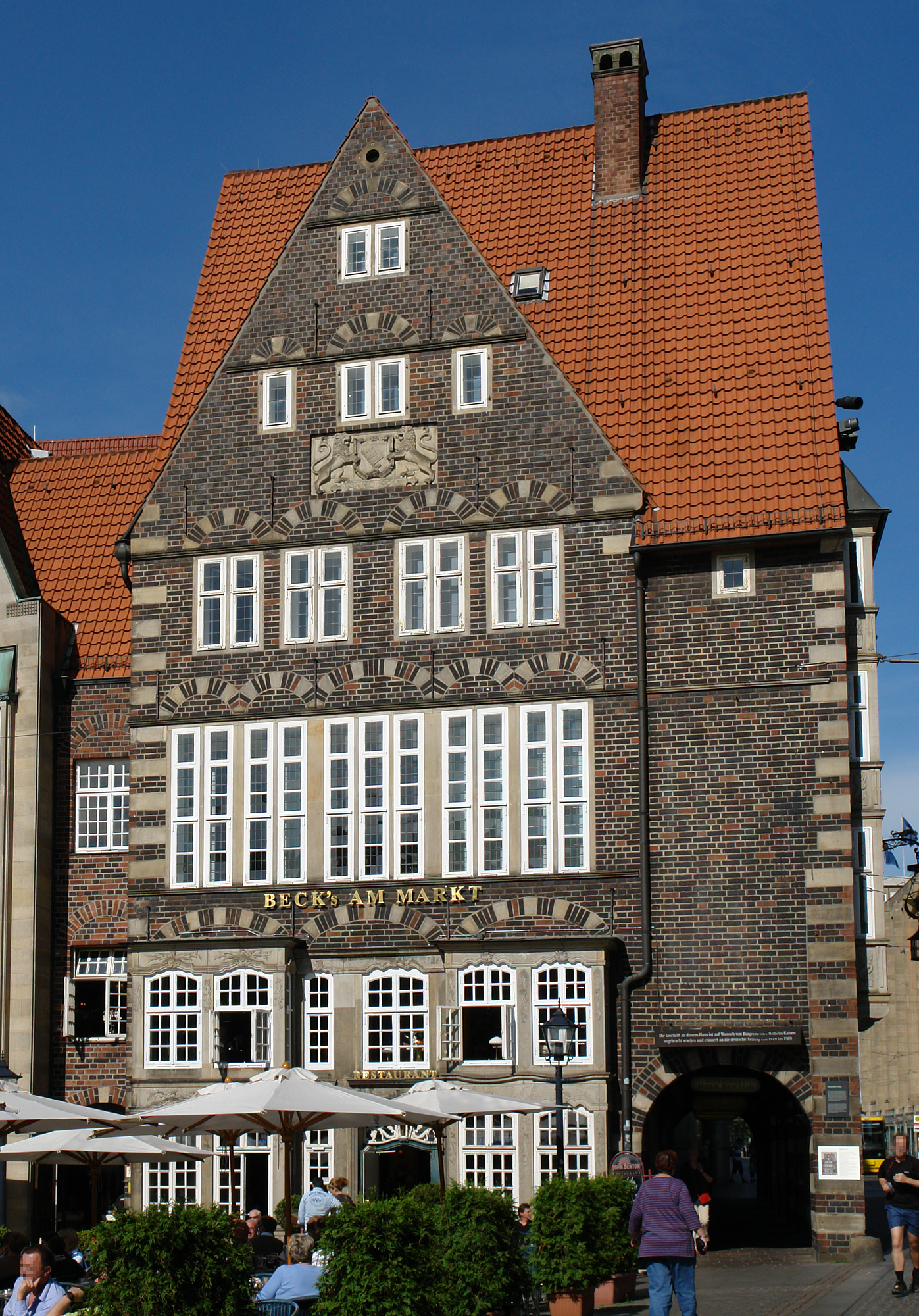
Rathscafé/Deutsches Haus

== Literature ==
- Heinrich W. Behrens (1947). "Rudolf Jacobs" (in German). Bremisches Jahrbuch, Reihe A, 42. Band. p. 217-.
