= List of National Democratic Party of Germany politicians =

A list of notable politicians of the National Democratic Party of Germany:

== B ==
- Safet Babic
- Herbert Böhme
- Friedhelm Busse

== D ==
- Günter Deckert

== F ==
- Gerhard Frey

== K ==
- Erich Kern
- Michael Kühnen

== M ==
- Horst Mahler
- Martin Mussgnug

== N ==
- Harald Neubauer

== P ==
- Jens Pühse

== S ==
- Michael Swierczek

== T ==
- Adolf von Thadden
- Friedrich Thielen

== V ==
- Udo Voigt

== W ==
- Gertraud Winkelvoss
