= National Democratic Party of Germany (disambiguation) =

The National Democratic Party of Germany is the former name of Die Heimat (The Homeland), a far-right, neo-Nazi party.

National Democratic Party of Germany may also refer to:

- National Democratic Party of Germany (2023), a splinter from the original NPD/Heimat.
- National Democratic Party of Germany (East Germany), a satellite party that formerly existed in the German Democratic Republic.
