= Frank Franz =

German politician (born 1978)

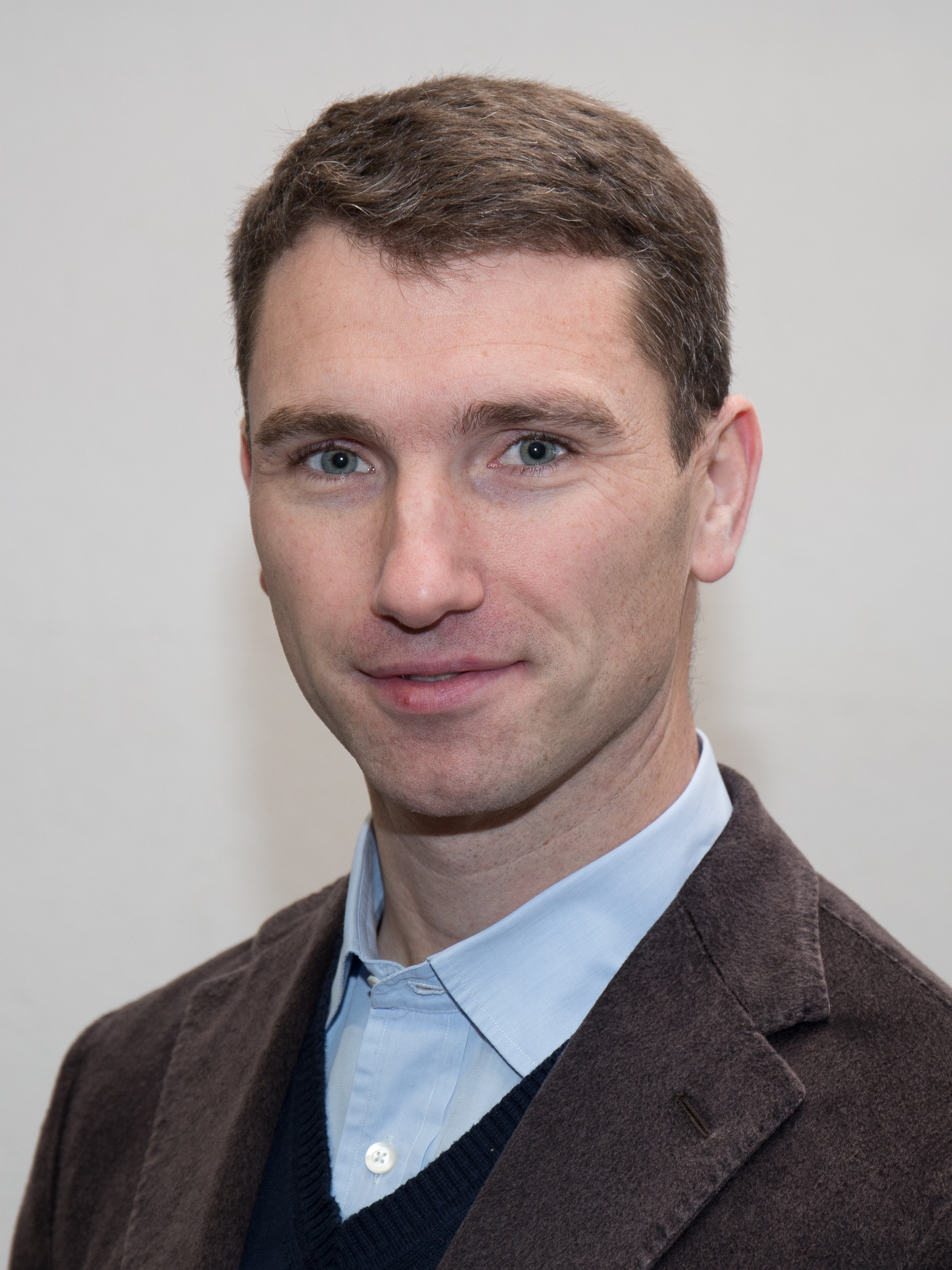
- Franz in 2017

Leader of The Homeland
- In office 1 November 2014 – 25 November 2024
- Preceded by: Udo Pastörs
- Succeeded by: Peter Schreiber

Leader of the NPD in the Saarland
- In office 2005–2012
- Preceded by: Peter Marx
- Succeeded by: Peter Marx

Personal details
- Born: 21 November 1978 (age 47) Völklingen, Saarland, West Germany (now Germany)
- Party: The Homeland
- Spouse: Patricia Koperski (separated)
- Children: 3
- Website: frank-franz.de

Military service
- Allegiance: Germany
- Branch/service: Bundeswehr; German Army
- Years of service: 1994–2004
- Rank: Oberfeldwebel

Frank Franz (born 21 November 1978) is a German far-right politician who served as the leader of The Homeland between 2014 and 2024 when he was succeeded by Peter Schreiber. Between 2005 and 2011 he served as the chairman of the National Democratic Party of Germany (NPD) in the German state of Saarland as well as the party's national press officer from 2011 to 2014.

== Biography ==
Franz was born in Völklingen. From 1997 to 2004, he served in the Bundeswehr, which he left as a staff sergeant. From 2007 onwards he worked as a programmer and artist, and owns an agency that handles the NPD's Internet activities.

Internally, Franz is controversial, as he is seen as a protégé of Peter Marx, who was not confirmed as the party's secretary general in the wake of a failed attempted takeover of the party in early 2009.

Franz is separated from his wife, with whom he has three children. Since 2015, he has been dating a woman named Patricia Koperski, who guest-starred on German soap opera GZSZ and owns a right-wing publishing house.

The renaming of the NPD to Die Heimat was spearheaded under the leadership of Frank Franz.
