= 2014 European Parliament election in Germany =

- 25 May 2014
- All 96 German seats to the European Parliament
- Turnout: 48.14% (▲4.87 pp)
Party	Leader	Vote %	Seats	+/–
CDU/CSU	David McAllister	35.4%	34	−8
SPD	Martin Schulz	27.3%	27	+4
Greens	Rebecca Harms	10.7%	11	−3
Left	Gabi Zimmer	7.4%	7	−1
AfD	Bernd Lucke	7.1%	7	New
FDP	Alexander Graf Lambsdorff	3.4%	3	−9
FW	Ulrike Müller	1.5%	1	+1
Pirates	Felix Reda	1.4%	1	+1
Tierschutzpartei	Stefan Eck	1.2%	1	+1
NPD	Udo Voigt	1.0%	1	+1
Familie	Arne Gericke	0.7%	1	+1
ÖDP	Klaus Buchner	0.6%	1	+1
PARTEI	Martin Sonneborn	0.6%	1	+1
This lists parties that won seats. See the complete results below.
Winning party by district and independent city

The 2014 European Parliament election in Germany was held on 25 May 2014. Under the Lisbon Treaty, Germany lost three seats and elected 96 members of the European Parliament, instead of the previous 99.

== Electoral threshold ==
The previous electoral threshold of 5% was ruled unconstitutional in 2011, leading the major parties to implement a 3% threshold instead. However the Constitutional Court ruled on 26 February 2014 that this threshold was illegal as well. Under this circumstances a vote share of 0.6% proved sufficient to win an EP seat (result of Die PARTEI) and seven parties won single seats; the seats were allocated according to the Webster/Sainte-Laguë method.

== Opinion polling ==
Date	Polling Firm	CDU/CSU EPP	SPD S&D	Greens G/EFA	FDP ALDE	Left GUE-NGL	AfD ECR	Others
22 May 2014	FGW	37.5	26.5	10	3.5	7.5	7	8
16 May 2014	FGW	38	27	11	3	8	6	7
14 May 2014	Infratest dimap	37	27	9	3	9	7	8
13 May 2014	YouGov	39	25	10	4	9	6	7
9 May 2014	Forschungsgruppe Wahlen	38	27	12	3	8	6	6
30 April 2014	infratest dimap	39	27	9	4	8	6	7
25 April 2014	INSA	36	28	11	4	9	7	5
11 April 2014	Forschungsgruppe Wahlen	39	27	11	3	8	6	6
3 April 2014	infratest dimap	40	28	9	3	7	6	7
28 March 2014	Forschungsgruppe Wahlen	39	26	12	3	8	6	6
14 March 2014	Forschungsgruppe Wahlen	38	26	11	4	8	6	7
9 March 2014	INSA	38	26	9.5	3	8.5	7.5	–
6 March 2014	Infratest	40	26	11	4	7	5	7
21 February 2014	Forschungsgruppe Wahlen	40	24	12	4	8	6	6
14 February 2014	INSA	39	25	10	3	10	8	5
6 February 2014	Infratest	38	29	10	4	8	6	5
26 January 2014	Emnid	42	26	10	3	8	7	4
7 June 2009	Election Results	37.9	20.8	12.1	11.0	7.5	—N/a	9.8

== Results ==
Party or alliance		Votes	%	Seats	+/–
EPP	Christian Democratic Union	8,812,653	30.02	29	–5
S&D	Social Democratic Party	8,003,628	27.26	27	+4
G/EFA	Alliance '90/The Greens	3,139,274	10.69	11	–3
GUE-NGL	The Left	2,168,455	7.39	7	–1
ECR	Alternative for Germany	2,070,014	7.05	7	New
EPP	Christian Social Union	1,567,448	5.34	5	–3
ALDE	Free Democratic Party	986,841	3.36	3	–9
ALDE	Free Voters	428,800	1.46	1	+1
G/EFA	Pirate Party Germany	425,044	1.45	1	+1
GUE-NGL	Human Environment Animal Protection Party	366,598	1.25	1	+1
NI	National Democratic Party	301,139	1.03	1	+1
ECR	Family Party	202,803	0.69	1	+1
G/EFA	Ecological Democratic Party	185,244	0.63	1	+1
NI	Die PARTEI	184,709	0.63	1	+1
ECR	The Republicans	109,757	0.37	0	0
NI	From now on... Democracy by Referendum	88,535	0.30	0	0
NI	Bavaria Party	62,438	0.21	0	0
NI	Party of Bible-abiding Christians	55,336	0.19	0	0
NI	Pro NRW	52,649	0.18	0	New
NI	Party for Labour, Environment and Family	50,953	0.17	0	0
NI	Christian Centre	30,136	0.10	0	0
NI	German Communist Party	25,147	0.09	0	0
NI	Marxist–Leninist Party	18,198	0.06	0	New
NI	Bürgerrechtsbewegung Solidarität	10,369	0.04	0	0
NI	Party for Social Equality	8,924	0.03	0	0
Total		29,355,092	100.00	96	–3
Valid votes		29,355,092	98.36		
Invalid/blank votes		488,706	1.64		
Total votes		29,843,798	100.00		
Registered voters/turnout		61,998,824	48.14		
Source: Bundeswahlleiter

CDU/CSU vote

SPD vote

Green vote

Linke vote

AFD vote

FDP vote

NPD vote

Familien-Partei vote

=== Results by state ===
Results for each party by state.

State	Union	SPD	Grüne	Linke	AfD	FDP	Others
Baden-Württemberg	39.3	23.0	13.2	3.6	7.9	4.1	8.9 (Note: (NPD 0.6%))
Bavaria	40.5	20.1	12.1	2.9	8.1	3.1	13.3 (Note: (NPD 0.6%))
Berlin	20.0	24.0	19.1	16.2	7.9	2.8	10.0 (Note: (NPD 1%))
Brandenburg (formerly part of East Germany)	25.0	26.9	6.1	19.7	8.5	2.1	11.7 (Note: (NPD 2.6%))
Bremen	22.4	34.4	17.6	9.6	5.8	3.3	7.1 (Note: (NPD 0.6%))
Hamburg	24.6	33.8	17.2	8.6	6.0	3.7	6.1 (Note: (NPD 0.4%))
Hesse	30.6	30.3	12.9	5.6	9.1	4.1	7.3 (Note: (NPD 0.8%))
Lower Saxony	39.4	32.5	10.9	4.0	5.4	2.5	5.3 (Note: (NPD 0.6%))
Mecklenburg-Vorpommern (formerly part of East Germany)	34.6	21.2	5.1	19.6	7.0	1.9	10.6 (Note: (NPD 3%))
North Rhine-Westphalia	35.6	33.7	10.1	4.7	5.4	4.0	6.5 (Note: (NPD 0.6%))
Rhineland-Palatinate	38.4	30.7	8.1	3.7	6.7	3.7	8.7 (Note: (NPD 0.7%))
Saarland	34.9	34.4	6.0	6.6	6.8	2.2	9.0 (Note: (NPD 1.3%))
Saxony (formerly part of East Germany)	34.5	15.6	6.0	18.3	10.1	2.6	12.9 (Note: (NPD 3.6%))
Saxony-Anhalt (formerly part of East Germany)	30.7	21.7	4.8	21.8	6.3	2.6	12.0 (Note: (NPD 2.1%))
Schleswig-Holstein	34.4	31.9	12.4	4.5	6.8	3.8	6.2 (Note: (NPD 0.5%))
Thuringia (formerly part of East Germany)	31.8	18.4	5.0	22.5	7.4	2.1	12.8 (Note: (NPD 3.4%))

=== Post-poll alliance ===
EPP	S&D	ECR	ALDE	GUE/NGL	G-EFA	EFDD	NI	(Germany) Total
29 (CDU); 5 (CSU)	27 (SPD)	7 (AfD); 1 (Familie)	3 (FDP); 1 (FW)	7 (Linke); 1 (Tierschutz)	11 (B'90/Grüne); 1 (Piraten); 1 (ÖDP)		1 (NPD); 1 (Partei)	96
