= 2004 Saxony state election =

State election in Saxony, Germany

- 19 September 2004

All 124 seats in the Landtag of Saxony 63 seats needed for a majority
- Turnout: 2,080,135 (59.6%) ▼1.5 pp
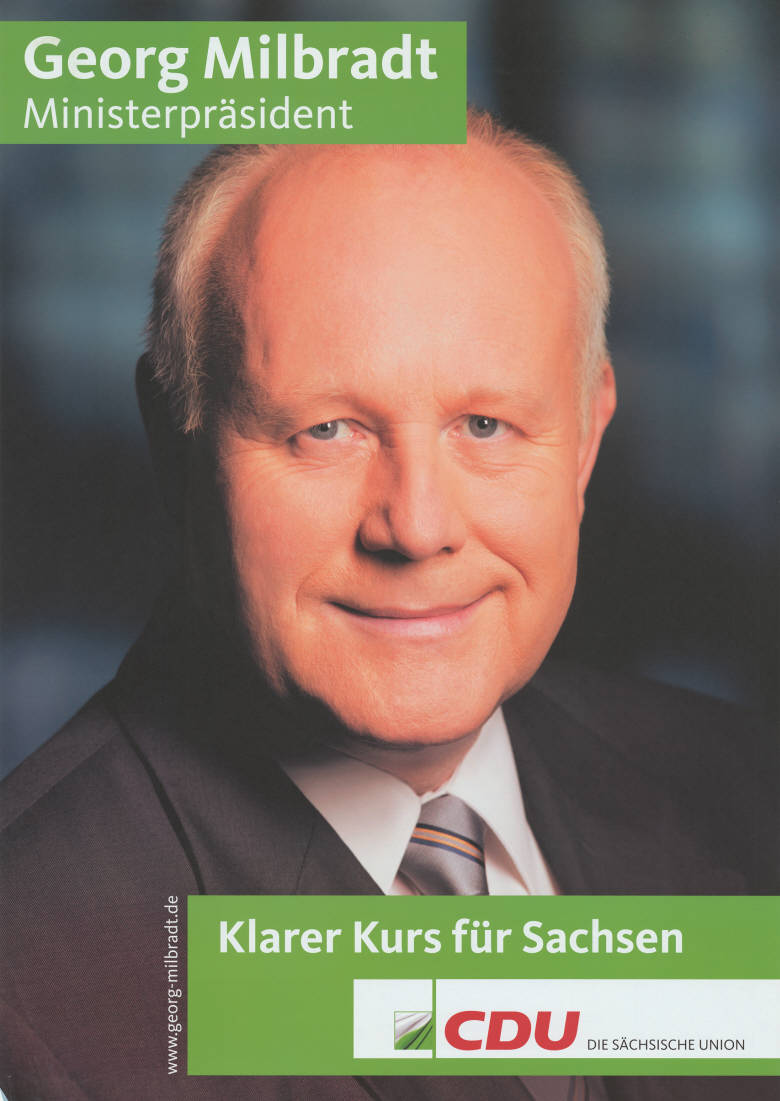

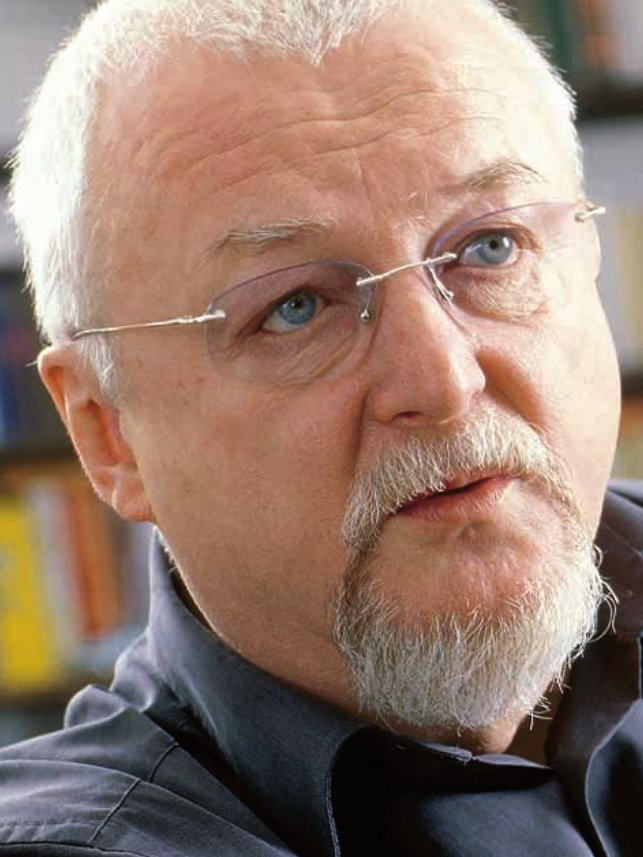

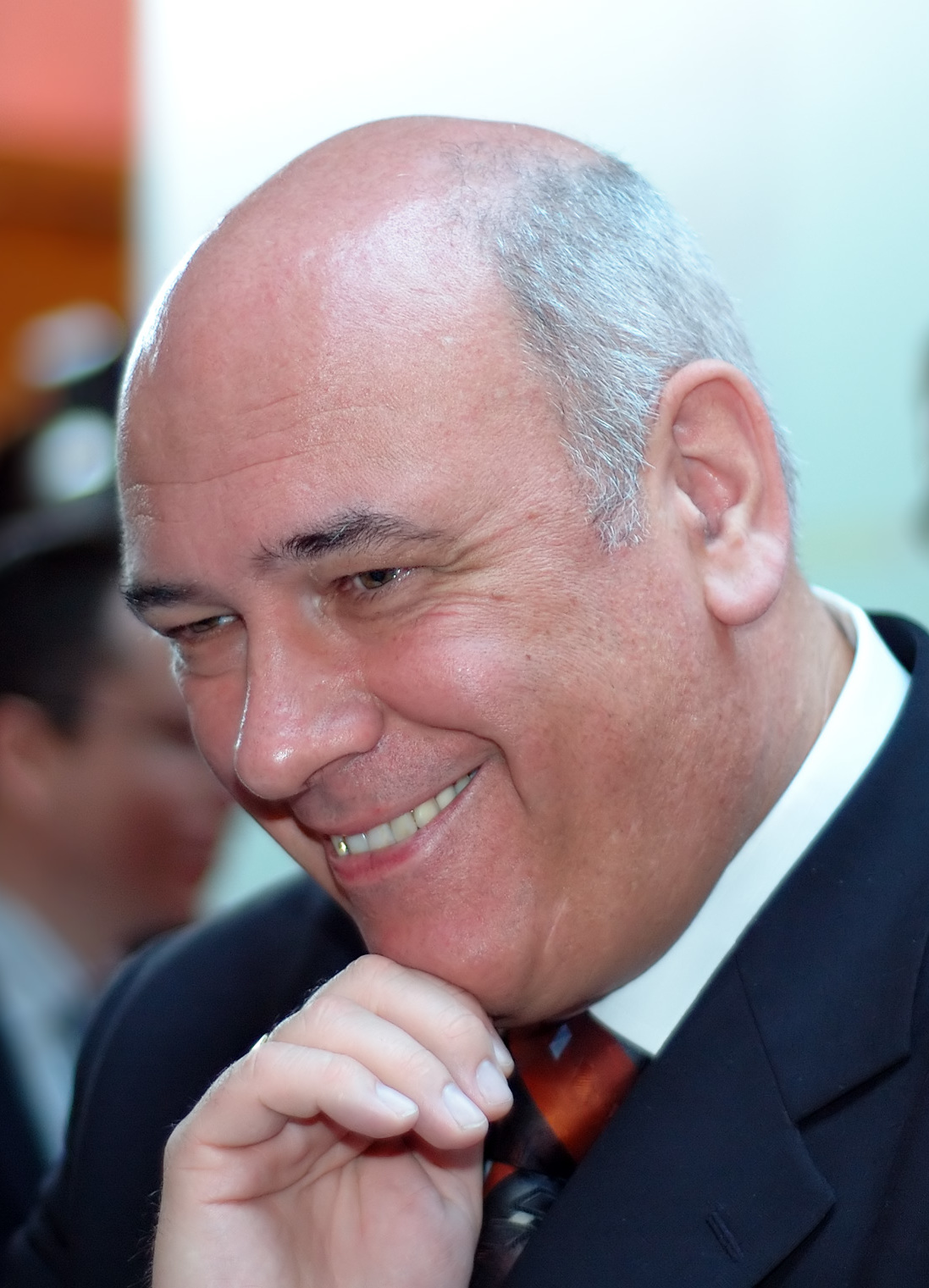

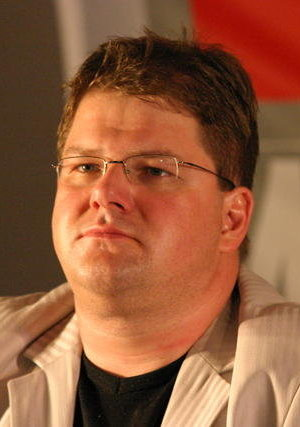

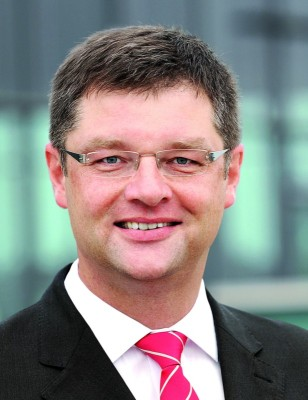

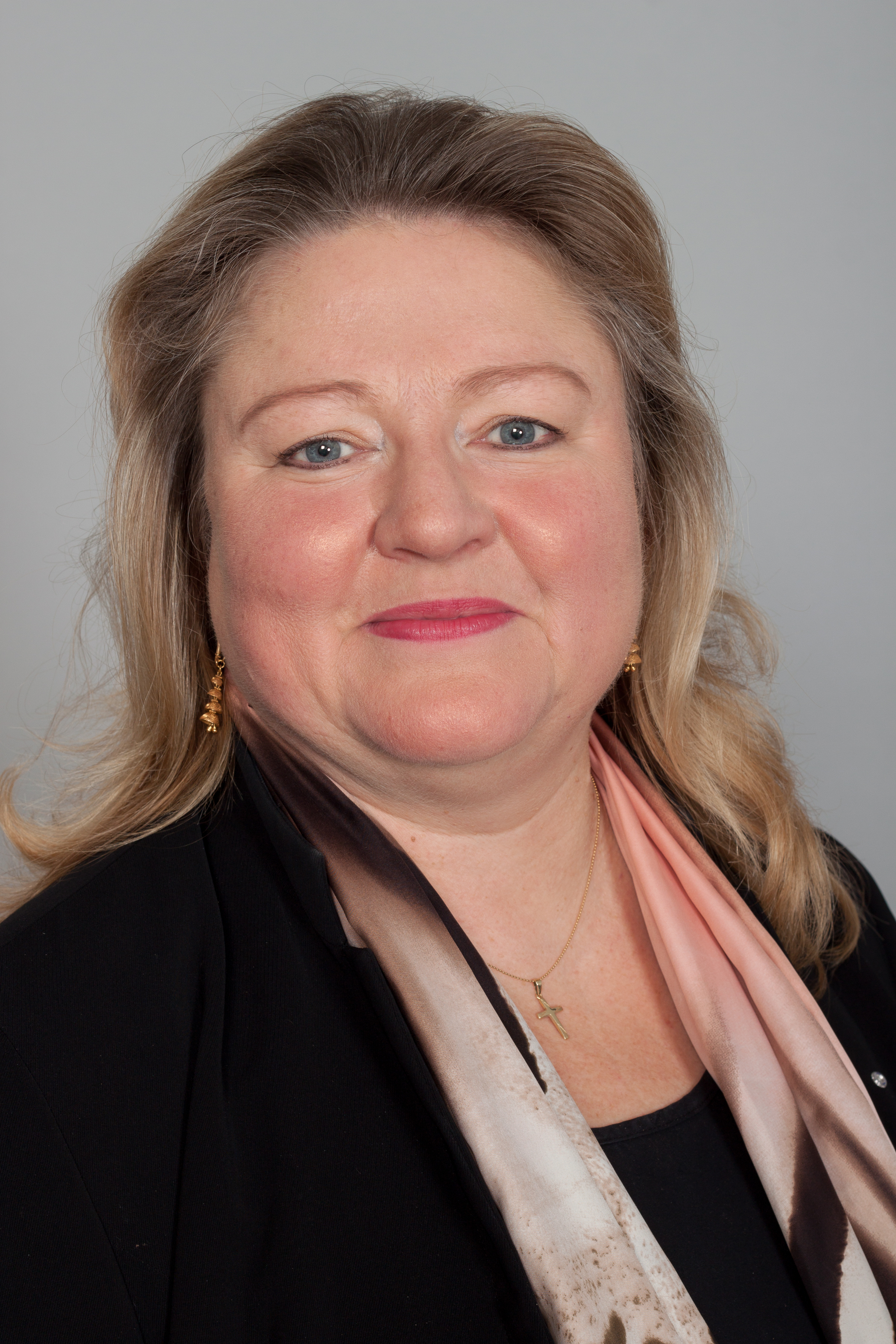
	First party	Second party	Third party
Leader	Georg Milbradt	Peter Porsch	Thomas Jurk
Party	CDU	PDS	SPD
Last election	76 seats, 56.9%	30 seats, 22.2%	14 seats, 10.7%
Seats won	55	31	13
Seat change	▼21	▲1	▼1
Popular vote	855,203	490,488	204,438
Percentage	41.1%	23.6%	9.8%
Swing	▼15.8 pp	▲1.4 pp	▼0.9 pp
	Fourth party	Fifth party	Sixth party
Leader	Holger Apfel	Holger Zastrow	Antje Hermenau
Party	NPD	FDP	Greens
Last election	0 seats, 1.4%	0 seats, 1.1%	0 seats, 2.6%
Seats won	12	7	6
Seat change	▲12	▲7	▲6
Popular vote	190,909	122,605	106,771
Percentage	9.2%	5.9%	5.1%
Swing	▲7.8 pp	▲4.8 pp	▲2.5 pp
- Results for the single-member constituencies
Minister-President before election
Georg Milbradt
CDU
Elected Minister-President
Georg Milbradt
CDU

The 2004 Saxony state election was held on 19 September 2004 to elect the members of the 4th Landtag of Saxony. The incumbent Christian Democratic Union (CDU) government led by Minister-President Georg Milbradt lost its majority. The CDU subsequently formed a grand coalition with the Social Democratic Party (SPD), and Milbradt was re-elected as Minister-President.

The Far Right National Democratic Party of Germany (NPD) won 12 seats. This is the first time since the 1960s that the party had seats in a state parliament.

== Parties ==
The table below lists parties represented in the 3rd Landtag of Saxony.

Name		Ideology	Leader(s)	1999 result	
Name		Ideology	Leader(s)	Votes (%)	Seats
CDU	Christian Democratic Union of Germany; Christlich Demokratische Union Deutschlands	Christian democracy	Georg Milbradt	56.9%	76 / 120
PDS	Party of Democratic Socialism; Partei des Demokratischen Sozialismus	Democratic socialism	Peter Porsch	22.2%	30 / 120
SPD	Social Democratic Party of Germany; Sozialdemokratische Partei Deutschlands	Social democracy	Thomas Jurk	10.7%	14 / 120

== Opinion polling ==
Polling firm	Fieldwork date	Sample size	CDU	PDS	SPD	Grüne	NPD	FDP	Others	Lead
2004 state election	19 Sep 2004	–	41.1	23.6	9.8	5.1	9.2	5.9	5.3	17.5
IfM Leipzig	7–9 Sep 2004	803	44	19	14	7	7	6	3	25
Forschungsgruppe Wahlen	6–9 Sep 2004	1,035	47	19	11	6	9	4	4	28
Infratest dimap	2–6 Sep 2004	1,000	44	23	12	6	7	5	3	21
Forsa	31 Aug–4 Sep 2004	1,002	46	24	12	6	4	4	4	22
IfM Leipzig	31 Aug 2004	1,006	46	21	12	7	3	5	6	25
Forsa	16–20 Aug 2004	1,007	48	24	11	5	4	4	4	24
IfM Leipzig	21 Aug 2004	?	48	22	10	6	3.5	5	5.5	26
IfM Leipzig	15 Aug 2004	810	45	25	10	6	2	6	6	20
Infratest dimap	30 Jul–3 Aug 2004	1,000	44	25	12	6	–	4.5	8.5	19
IfM Leipzig	30 Jul 2004	808	48	27	12	5	–	4	4	21
Emnid	4–8 Jul 2004	1,078	50	23	10	5	–	4	8	27
IfM Leipzig	17 Jul 2004	808	54	21	13	5	–	3	4	33
IfM Leipzig	19 May 2004	825	55	18	17	5	–	3	2	37
IfM Leipzig	5–6 May 2004	1,042	56	17	17	5	–	3	2	39
Emnid	25 Nov–20 Dec 2003	1,100	57	22	12	2	–	2	5	35
IfM Leipzig	30 Dec 2003	814	59	18	13	4	–	4	2	41
Emnid	Jun–Jul 2003	1,010	53	22	14	4	–	2	5	31
Emnid	Dec 2002	1,056	57	21	13	3	–	2	4	36
IfM Leipzig	30 Dec 2002	800	57	20	13	4	–	1	5	37
IfM Leipzig	7 Mar 2002	?	52	21	19	2	–	4	2	31
Emnid	Nov–Dec 2001	1,009	43	25	18	3	–	5	6	18
Emnid	Jun 2001	1,023	46	20	22	2	–	4	6	24
Emnid	Dec 2000	1,083	47	20	22	3	–	3	5	25
Emnid	Jul 2000	?	49	21	20	2	–	3	5	28
1999 state election	19 Sep 1999	–	56.9	22.2	10.7	2.6	1.4	1.1	5.1	34.7

== Election result ==
Summary of the 19 September 2004 election results for the Landtag of Saxony
Party	Votes	%	+/-	Seats	+/-	Seats %
Christian Democratic Union (CDU)	855,203	41.1	▼15.8	55	▼21	44.4
Party of Democratic Socialism (PDS)	490,488	23.6	▲1.4	31	▲1	25.0
Social Democratic Party (SPD)	204,438	9.8	▼0.9	13	▼1	10.5
National Democratic Party (NPD)	190,909	9.2	▲7.8	12	▲12	9.7
Free Democratic Party (FDP)	122,605	5.9	▲4.8	7	▲7	5.6
Alliance 90/The Greens (Grüne)	106,771	5.1	▲2.5	6	▲6	4.8
Human Environment Animal Protection Party (Tierschutz)	34,068	1.6	▲1.6	0	±0	0
Others	75,652	3.6		0	±0	0
Total	2,080,135	100.0		124	▲4	
Voter turnout		59.6	▼1.5			

Popular Vote
CDU	41.11%
PDS	23.58%
SPD	9.83%
NPD	9.18%
FDP	5.89%
B'90/GRÜNE	5.13%
Other	5.27%

Landtag seats
CDU	44.35%
PDS	25.00%
SPD	10.48%
NPD	9.68%
FDP	5.65%
B'90/GRÜNE	4.84%

== Outcome ==
The most striking result of the election was the entrance of the far-right National Democratic Party (NPD) into the Landtag with 12 seats. This gained international attention. The party's support was concentrated in the rural areas; commentators attributed its success to alienation stemming from economic depression. The continuing strength of the SED successor party, the Party of Democratic Socialism, which again was the second largest party, was also notable.

The CDU remained the largest party with 55 of 124 seats, but lost its majority, forcing it to find coalition partners. The most logical was the classical liberal Free Democratic Party, who entered the Landtag in the election, but a CDU–FDP government would be one seat short of the necessary majority. Cooperation with the PDS or The Greens was ideologically unfeasible. A theoretical alliance between the CDU and NPD would hold a majority, but this was out of the question. The result was a grand coalition CDU and SPD. This government outcome was later mirrored in the 2005 federal election. The CDU's Georg Milbradt remained in office as Minister-President. Notably, the NPD received two more votes on the ballot for Minister-President than it had members in the Landtag. It is presumed that two CDU Landtag members backed the NPD as a protest against the grand coalition.

== See also ==
- 2006 Mecklenburg-Vorpommern state election

== Sources ==
- The Federal Returning Officer
