= Holger Apfel =

German politician (born 1970)

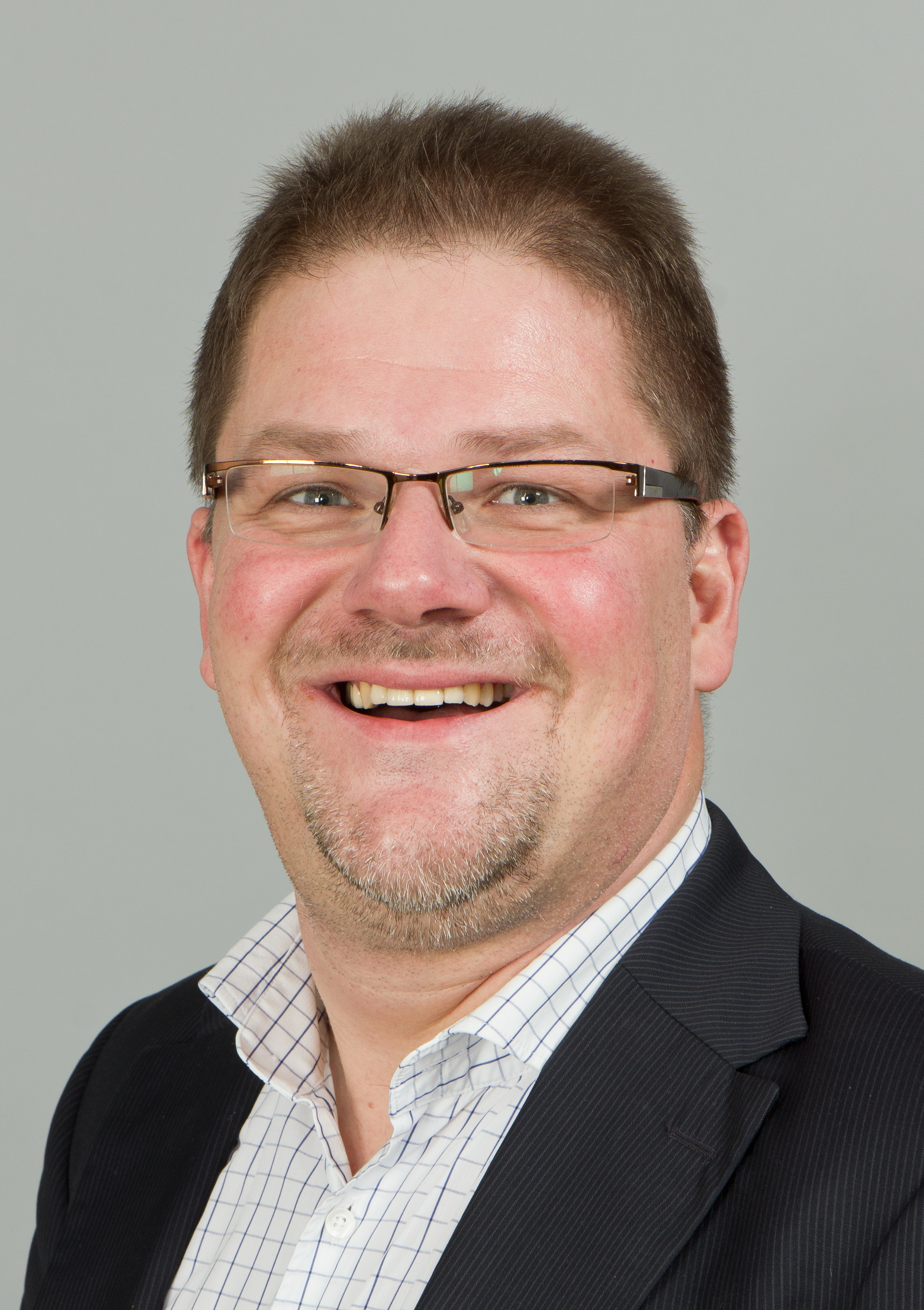
- Apfel in 2013

Leader of the National Democratic Party of Germany
- In office 13 November 2011 – 19 December 2013
- Preceded by: Udo Voigt
- Succeeded by: Udo Pastörs

Leader of the National Democratic Party of Germany of Saxony
- In office 2009–2012
- Preceded by: Winfried Petzold
- Succeeded by: Mario Löffler

Leader of the National Democratic Party of Germany in the Landtag of Saxony
- In office 19 October 2004 – 24 December 2013
- Preceded by: Position established
- Succeeded by: Johannes Müller

Member of the Landtag of Saxony
- In office 19 October 2004 – 17 January 2014
- Succeeded by: Holger Szymanski
- Constituency: NPD List

Personal details
- Born: 29 December 1970 (age 55) Hildesheim, Lower Saxony, West Germany (now Germany)
- Party: National Democratic Party (until December 2013)
- Spouse: Jasmin Apfel (sep. 2017)
- Children: 3

Holger Apfel (born 29 December 1970) is a German politician who was the leader of the far-right National Democratic Party of Germany (NPD) from 2011 to 2013. He was a member of the Saxon Parliament between 2004 and 2014, serving as the chairman of the NPD parliamentary group and a member of the presidium of the parliament.

Apfel became the NPD's national leader in 2011. On 19 December 2013, he resigned with immediate effect from his leadership positions at both the national and the state level, before leaving the party entirely five days later. He resigned from the Saxon Parliament on 17 January 2014.

== Political activities ==
Apfel has a long history of activism with the NPD, starting in the 1980s when he was active in the NPD's youth organisation. He was the deputy chairman of the NPD at the national level between 2000 and 2009 and deputy chairman at the state level between 2002 and 2009. Between 2009 and 2011, he served as the chairman of Saxony's NPD.

=== State politics ===
On 19 September 2004, Apfel led the NPD in Saxony to its biggest electoral success, winning 9.2% of the popular vote and twelve seats in the Landtag of Saxony. He became the leader of the party's parliamentary group.

In 2005, the Landtag of Saxony held a minute of silence for the victims of Nazi Germany. Apfel, along with 11 other NPD politicians, boycotted the remembrance and staged a walkout from the Landtag chamber. He also gave a speech in which he demanded a moment of silence be held for the victims of the bombing of Dresden in 1945 and called the Allies of World War II "mass murderers", stating that "Today we in this parliament are taking up the political battle for historical truth, and against the servitude of guilt of the German people... The causes of the holocaust bombing of Dresden have nothing to do with either September 1, 1939 or with January 30, 1933." Apfel's speech caused politicians from other parties in the Landtag to walk out in protest.

=== National politics ===
In the 2005 federal election, he was a candidate for the constituency of Kamenz, Hoyerswerda and Großenhain, and received 6.7% of the votes.

On 13 November 2011, he was elected leader of the NPD at the national level.

=== Resignation ===
On 19 December 2013, he resigned with immediate effect from his leadership positions at both the national and the state level. Media outlets initially reported that Apfel was in poor health and suffering from "burnout syndrome".

Three days after the announcement, the party presidium held an emergency meeting to discuss rumours about Apfel's private life. It subsequently issued a statement asserting that Apfel "has not yet refuted ongoing allegations concerning past transgressions". Amid the threat of an expulsion proceeding, Apfel resigned from the party entirely on 24 December.

Apfel resigned from his seat in the Saxon Parliament on 17 January 2014.

== Personal life ==
Apfel was married to Jasmin Apfel (born 1983), formerly the head of the NPD women's organisation, Ring Nationaler Frauen. They have three children. In 2012, the couple separated and Jasmin Apfel announced that she had resigned from both the RNF and the NPD. However, Apfel announced later that year that the couple were once again together. In March 2017 it was reported that Jasmin Apfel and her husband had separated, and that she had renounced right-wing extremism.

It was reported in May 2014 that Apfel and his wife had begun operating a local restaurant on the island of Mallorca.

== In popular culture ==
Holger Apfel, as the then-leader of the NDP, appears as a character in the 2013 satirical novel Look Who's Back by Timur Vermes about a fictional reappearing of Adolf Hitler in modern Germany. In the 2015 film based on the novel, Holger Apfel was not named directly, but replaced by the character "Ulf Birne" (the name "Birne", german word for pear, is a word play with the name "Apfel", german word for apple).
