= Georg Milbradt =

German politician

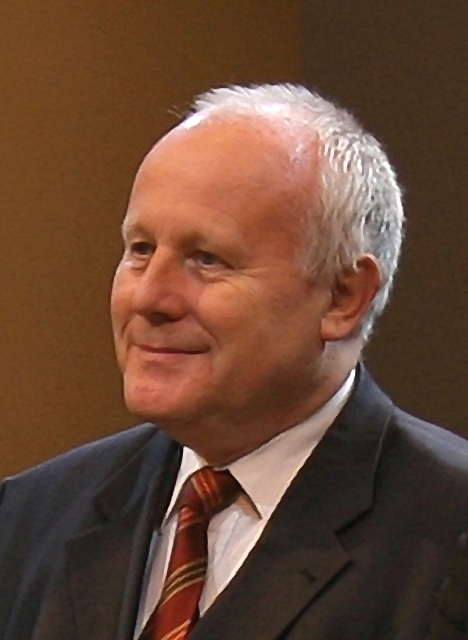
- Milbradt in 2006

Minister-President of Saxony
- In office 18 April 2002 – 27 May 2008
- President: Johannes Rau; Horst Köhler
- Chancellor: Gerhard Schröder; Angela Merkel
- Preceded by: Kurt Biedenkopf
- Succeeded by: Stanislaw Tillich

Personal details
- Born: 23 February 1945 (age 81) Eslohe, North Rhine-Westphalia, Germany
- Party: Christian Democratic Union
- Education: University of Münster

Georg Milbradt (born 23 February 1945) is a German politician of the Christian Democratic Union (CDU) who served as Minister-President of Saxony from 2002 to 2008.

== Early life ==
Milbradt was born in Eslohe. His family originally was from Wągrowiec (Wongrowitz) near Poznań (Posen) but ended up in Dortmund after World War II, and he passed his Abitur there in 1964.

From 1964 to 1968, Milbradt studied economics, law, and mathematics at the University of Münster. He graduated with a degree in economics in 1968. From 1970 to 1980, he was a scientific assistant at the Institute for finance at the University of Münster, where he obtained his doctoral degree (Dr. rer. pol., summa cum laude) in 1973 and his habilitation in 1980. From 1980 to 1983, Milbradt worked as a substitute professor of finance and political economics at the University of Mainz; since 1985, he has held the title of an (unsalaried) professor at the economics faculty in Münster.

== Political career ==
=== Career in state politics ===
Milbradt has been a member of the CDU since 1973. He was head of the finance department of the city of Münster from 1983 to 1990.

Milbradt served as Minister of Finance of Saxony from 1990 to January 2001 but was dismissed from office by Minister-President Kurt Biedenkopf because Milbradt had started a debate about Biedenkopf's succession. Milbradt served as a member of the state board of the CDU from 1991 and became deputy chairman of the state CDU in 1999 and chairman in 2001. From 1994 until 2009, he was a member of the State Parliament of Saxony.

=== Minister-President of Saxony, 2002–2009 ===
On 18 April 2002, Milbradt was elected as Minister-President of Saxony, despite Biedenkopf's explicit opposition. Milbradt first governed with an absolute CDU majority, but in a coalition with the SPD after the 2004 elections, in which the CDU lost a large number of votes.

During Milbradt's second term, the state government secured a sizable investment by American chipmaker AMD into expanding production of 300-millimeter wafers in Dresden; AMD received an undisclosed volume of subsidies from the government.

In August 2007, just before the 2008 financial crisis, Milbradt announced that the state government would sell its 51% share in SachsenLB – which found itself overwhelmed by Subprime lending-linked losses incurred by off-balance-sheet subsidiaries – to the larger Landesbank Baden-Württemberg (LBBW).

In April 2008 Milbradt announced that he would resign from the office by the end of May and that Stanislaw Tillich would succeed him. He had been under pressure for months because of his involvement in the liquidity crisis of Sachsen LB. Milbradt had also been criticized for private loans from the bank during his time as Minister of Finance in Saxony; in April 2008, the state government confirmed that Milbradt and his wife had borrowed a total of around €172,000 ($272,000) between 1996 and 1999 to help purchase around €360,000 in investment fund products from a subsidiary of the bank.

== Life after politics ==
In 2010, Milbradt and former Mayor of Hannover Herbert Schmalstieg served as arbitrators to mediate in a wage dispute between the German United Services Trade Union (ver.di) and the country's public sector employers. He later successfully mediated in a similar conflict between train operator ODEG and the German Train Drivers' Union (GDL) in 2011. In 2015, the Association of Local Government Employers (VKA) appointed Milbradt as its negotiator in a dispute with employees of day nurseries in Germany; again, Schmalstieg served as his counterpart in the talks. In 2023, he was again appointed as one of two mediators in a protracted wage dispute between Germany's public sector employers and a group of trade unions.

As a delegate of the Catholic Church in Germany, Milbradt was one of the members of the country's temporary National Commission on the Disposal of Radioactive Waste from 2014 and 2016. From 2015 until 2016, he served on a government-appointed commission tasked with recommending how to safeguard the funding of fulfilling Germany's exit from nuclear energy, under the leadership of co-chairs Ole von Beust, Matthias Platzeck and Jürgen Trittin. He was a CDU delegate to the Federal Convention for the purpose of electing the President of Germany in 2017 and 2022.

Since 2017, Milbradt has been serving as the German government's special envoy for the Ukrainian reform agenda; his mandate was extended in 2022.

== Other activities ==
- HHL Foundation, Chairman of the Board
- Max Planck Institute for the Physics of Complex Systems, Member of the Board of Trustees
- Forum of Federations, Member of the Board (2010-2013), Chairman of the Board (from 2013)
- Deutsche Bank, Member of the Advisory Board (2004-2006)

Milbradt oversees the Schüler Helfen Leben initiative.

== Recognition ==
- 2009 – Grand Cross of the Order of Merit of the Federal Republic of Germany
- 2004 – Grand Decoration of Honour in Silver with Sash for Services to the Republic of Austria
- 2002 – Order of Merit of the Free State of Saxony

== Personal life ==
Milbradt has been married to Angelika Meeth-Milbradt, a professor of economics, since 1975. They have two children.

== Works ==
- Die demographische Herausforderung. Sachsens Zukunft gestalten, by Georg Milbradt and Johannes Meier, Bertelsmann Stiftung, 2004, ISBN 3-89204-793-6
- Kraft der Visionen, by Georg Milbradt and Thomas Rietzschel, Kiepenheuer, 2003, ISBN 3-378-01065-7
