= Udo Pastörs =

German politician

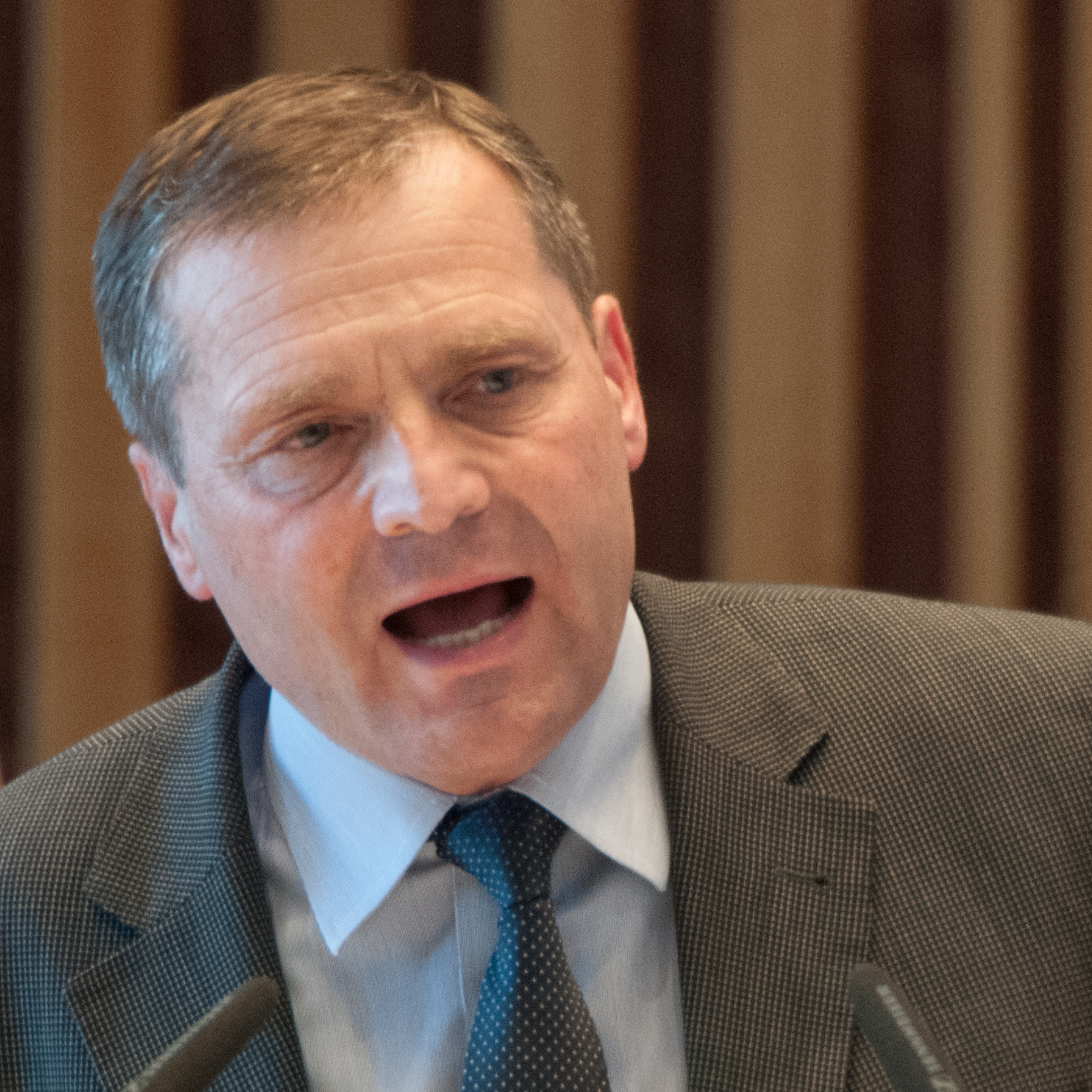
- Pastörs in 2013

Leader of the National Democratic Party
- In office 19 December 2013 – 1 November 2014; Acting: 19 December 2013 – 10 January 2014
- Deputy: Karl Richter; Frank Schwerdt
- Preceded by: Holger Apfel
- Succeeded by: Frank Franz

Member of the Landtag of Mecklenburg-Vorpommern
- In office 16 October 2006 – 4 October 2016
- Preceded by: multi-member district
- Succeeded by: multi-member district
- Constituency: National Democratic Party List

Personal details
- Born: Udo Michael Wilhelm Pastörs; 24 August 1952 (age 74) Wegberg, North Rhine-Westphalia, West Germany (now Germany)
- Party: National Democratic Party (2000–)
- Children: 1
- Occupation: Politician; Clockmaker

Udo Pastörs (born 24 August 1952) is a German politician and convicted Holocaust denier. He is the former leader of the far-right NPD, and served as a representative in the Landtag of Mecklenburg-Vorpommern until 2016.

Pastörs was considered one of the leading cadres within the traditional right-wing extremist scene in Germany until AfD emerged. Criminal investigations were repeatedly initiated against Pastörs. He was convicted several times for incitement to hatred and Holocaust denial and openly represented racist and antisemitic views. His political positions are based on Nazism.

== Personal life ==
Pastörs was born on 24 August 1952 in Wegberg, West Germany. He was also member and "Unterführer" of the Neo-Nazi organization Wiking-Jugend.

His learned profession is that of a clockmaker. He is married and has one daughter with his wife, Marianne Pastörs.

He joined the NPD in 2000. In 2005 he became the leader of the party in Mecklenburg-Vorpommern. He was first elected to state parliament in 2006, receiving 7.3% of the vote. He has been leading the party fraction since 2006.

== Controversies ==
In a speech on 25 February 2009, Pastörs referred to the Federal Republic of Germany as a "Jew republic", to Turkish-German men as "semen cannons", and to Alan Greenspan as a "hook-nose". A local court found him guilty of "incitement of popular hatred" in May 2010, sentencing him to a suspended sentence of ten months and a €6,000 fine.

=== 2019 European Court of Human Rights (ECHR or ECtHR) Decision ===
On 3 October 2019, the European Court of Human Rights unanimously decided on the case Pastörs v. Germany (application no. 55225/14) that a decision from the German Courts sentencing him to eight months' imprisonment, suspended on probation, based on the fact that a speech made by German politician Udo Pastörs stating that "the so-called Holocaust is being used for political and commercial purposes", as well as other Holocaust denial comments, incurred in violation of the memory of the dead and of the intentional defamation of the Jewish people was not a violation of Article 10 (freedom of expression) of the European Convention on Human Rights. Also, the ECtHR also decided by four votes to three that there had been no violation of Article 6 § 1 (right to a fair trial) of the European Convention on Human Rights.
