= Günter Deckert =

German political activist (1940–2022)

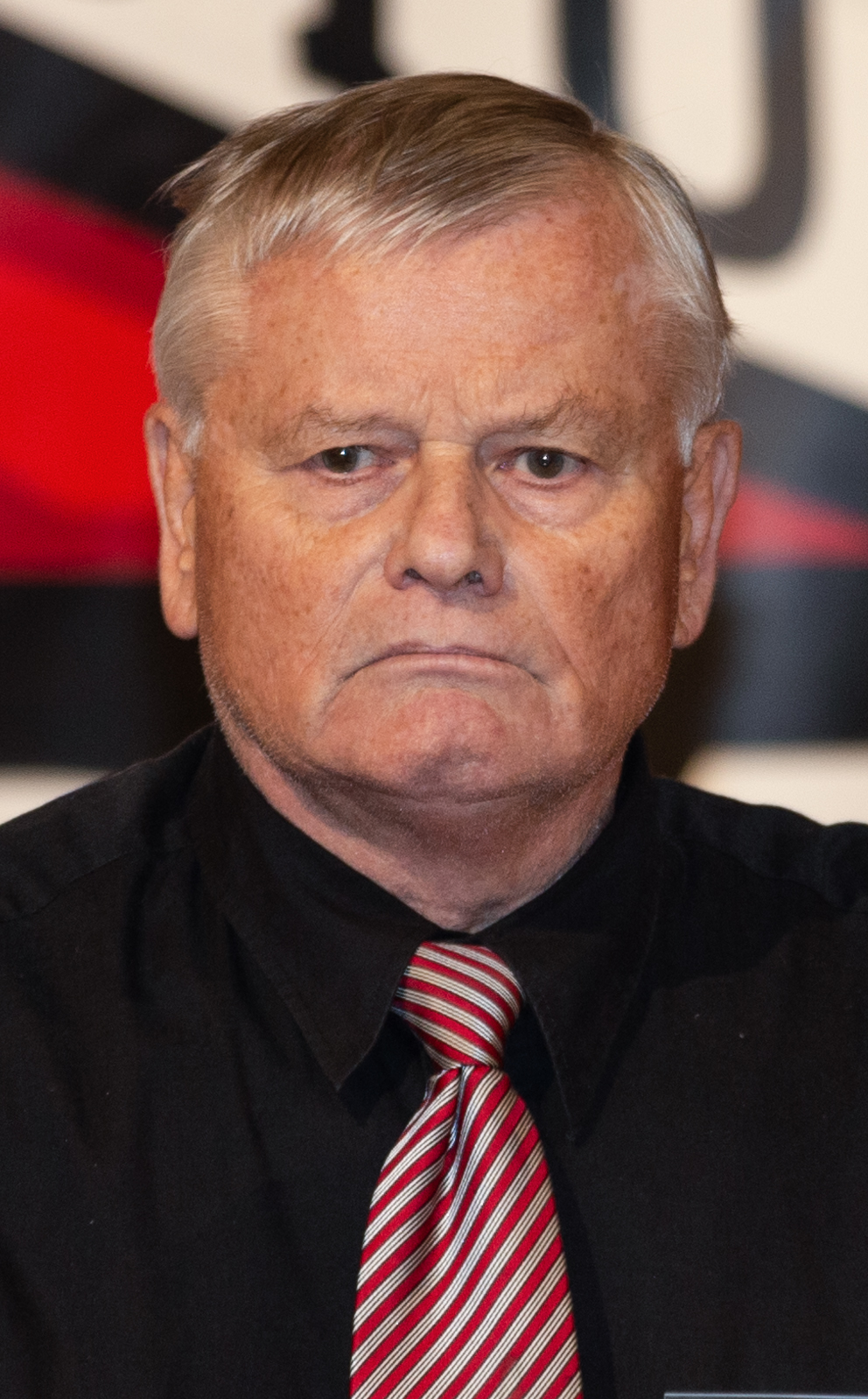
- Deckert in 2018

Leader of the National Democratic Party of Germany
- In office 1991–1996
- Preceded by: Martin Mussgnug
- Succeeded by: Udo Voigt

Personal details
- Born: 9 January 1940 Heidelberg, Baden, Germany
- Died: 31 March 2022 (aged 82) Weinheim, Baden-Württemberg, Germany
- Party: National Democratic Party of Germany
- Profession: Politician

Günter Deckert (9 January 1940 – 31 March 2022) was a German far-right political activist. He was the leader of the far-right National Democratic Party of Germany (NPD). He served five years in prison in Germany for various offences, including Holocaust denial and incitement to racial hatred. He translated the Leuchter report, an investigation he commissioned from an American Holocaust denier which attempted to cast doubt on the feasibility of mass extermination via the gas chambers in the Holocaust.

== Biography ==
Deckert was a high school teacher, but was fired from that job in 1988 after being repeatedly sanctioned for his political activism. He was also a city councilman in Weinheim and started a travel agency named Germania. He rose to fame when he became the chairman of the NPD.

In November 1991, Deckert participated in a meeting featuring Fred A. Leuchter, for which he was later charged and convicted of inciting racial hatred. Deckert translated what Leuchter was saying for the benefit of the audience, and said at the meeting that the Holocaust was a myth perpetrated by "a parasitical people who were using a historical lie to muzzle [...] Germany". In 1992 he was sentenced to one year in prison. Deckert appealed against the verdict of his conviction, and in March 1994 the Mannheim State Court ordered a retrial, on the grounds that the lower court had failed to ascertain all of the necessary facts.

At the retrial in the summer of 1994, one of the three panel judges, Judge Wolfgang Mueller, described him as an "intelligent man of character for whom the claim was a matter of the heart" and another, Judge Rainer Orlet, who had presided over the case and whose prior reputation for "revision-proof" opinions had made him seem ideal for the case, declared that Deckert had "expressed legitimate interests" when he had questioned the political and financial demands continuing to be made by Jews upon Germany almost fifty years after World War II, "while the mass murders of other nations remain unatoned". Orlet, in a sixty-six page opinion, found that Deckert was "no anti-Semite" who "left a good impression upon the court" as a "responsible personality of good character", and who merely considered it "desirable that research constantly rechecked even historical theses that are considered valid". The panel of three judges still found Deckert guilty, and sentenced him again to one year in prison, but this time as a suspended sentence, in the expectation (in the judges' opinion) that he would "avoid punishable involvements" in future, albeit that "changes in his political views ... were not to be expected".

These statements caused a public outcry: spokespeople for the Jewish community crying foul, the prosecutor decrying Orlet's opinions as "instructions" for denying the Holocaust, the German justice minister calling it "a slap in the face of all Holocaust victims", and the Association of German Judges calling it "a slip of the footing". As a consequence, the two judges were suspended (although they were reinstated a few months later^{N1}), and Deckert was ordered to a second retrial. At his third trial, in April 1995, Deckert was sentenced to two years in prison without probation, for Gefährliche Politische Brandstifung ("dangerous political incendiarism"), by Judge Wollentine in Karlsruhe.

Whilst in prison, Deckert wrote a letter to the then vice-chairman of the Central Council of Jews in Germany, Michel Friedman, strongly urging him, as a Jew, to leave Germany. This letter was published in the NPD newspaper. Deckert was charged with incendiarism a second time, and at trial in Mannheim in 1997 he was found guilty and sentenced to an additional two years and three months in prison. During the trial, Deckert's lawyer, Ludwig Boch, based the defence upon the assertion that the Holocaust was a "legend" invented by the Jews. The defence claimed that German politicians legitimized their "unique political incompetence" through the "uniqueness of German guilt", and called both Helmut Kohl and Roman Herzog to the stand. Boch was later, in 1999, himself fined Dm 9,000 for these assertions, which were determined to be Volksverhetzung (sedition).

In 2001 Deckert spoke at a meeting of the British National Party in London.

== Footnotes ==
- ^1 Aside from the views which various people found morally repugnant, Orlet's opinion is considered to be an able one. Orlet himself initially defended it, stating that when it was "considered objectively, it follows that it is in order as it stands". However, the news media subjected Orlet to a continual barrage of vilification and ridicule. Representatives in the Baden-Württemberg parliament called for his impeachment, albeit that the state constitution did not allow for Orlet's behaviour to be considered an impeachable offence. The view of most observers was an affirmation of the principle of the independence of the judiciary, set down in the German constitution: that an otherwise able judge could not be impeached, especially in response to political pressure from the legislature, for injudicious remarks (the chief justice above Orlet having called them "unfortunate formulations that might be misunderstood") in the course of an otherwise competent judicial work product. The full Mannheim State Court issued a press release, disassociating itself from any antisemitic views that people may have inferred from Orlet's opinion, but at the same time "deplor[ing] all attacks on the principle of judicial independence". Orlet later distanced himself from the verdict and retired.
