= 2006 Mecklenburg-Vorpommern state election =

German state election

- 17 September 2006

All 71 seats in the Landtag of Mecklenburg-Vorpommern 36 seats needed for a majority
- Turnout: 818,061 (59.2%) ▼11.4%
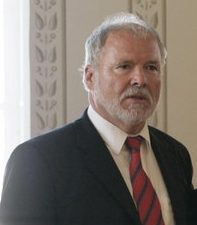

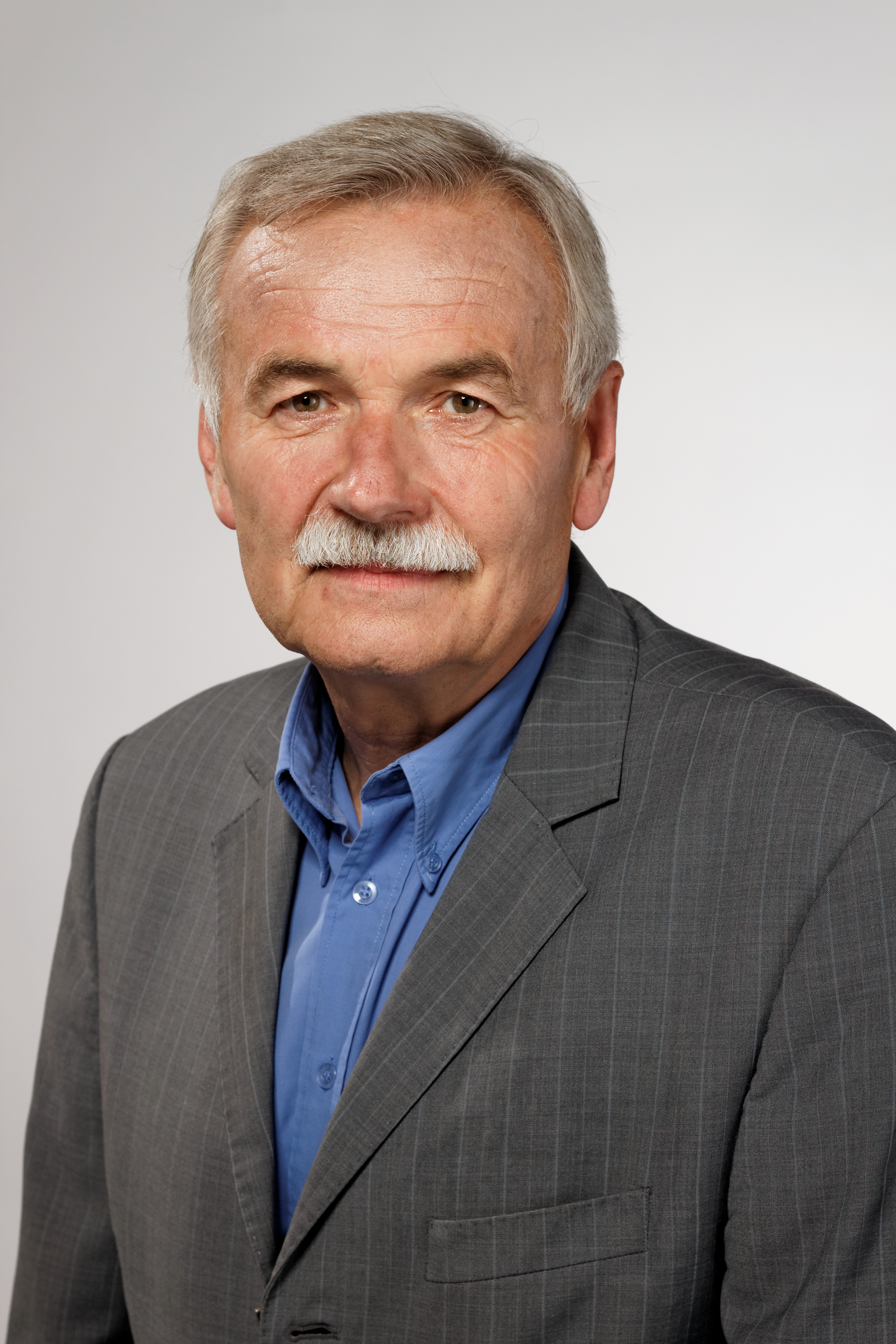

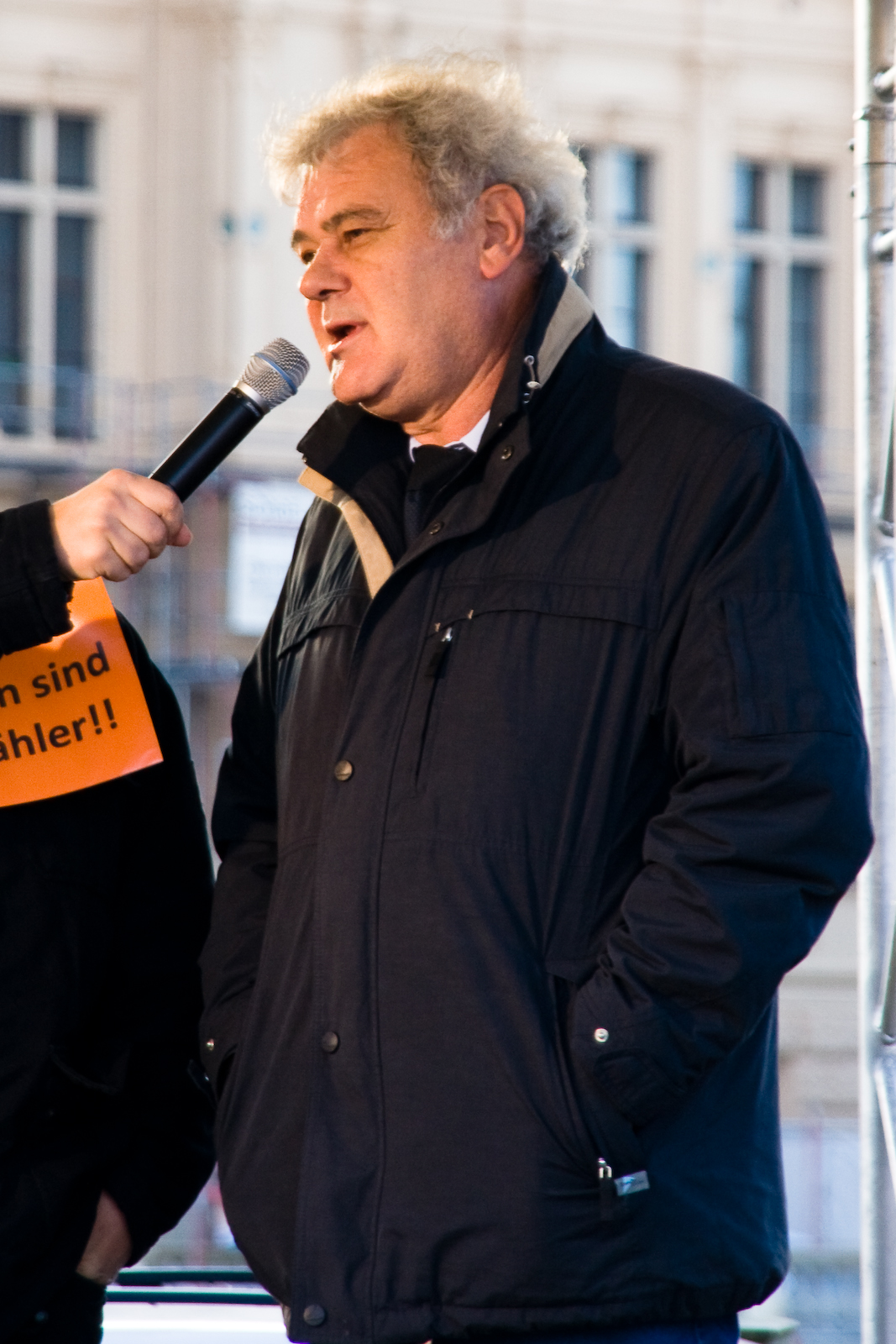

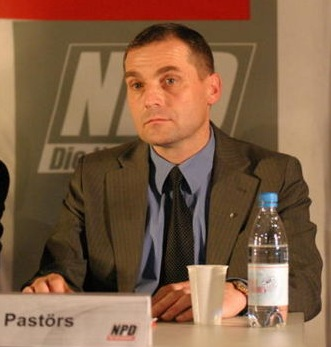
	First party	Second party	Third party
Leader	Harald Ringstorff	Jürgen Seidel	Wolfgang Methling
Party	SPD	CDU	PDS
Last election	33 seats, 40.6%	25 seats, 31.4%	13 seats, 16.4%
Seats won	23	22	13
Seat change	▼10	▼3	0
Popular vote	247,312	235,350	137,253
Percentage	30.2%	28.8%	16.8%
Swing	▼10.4%	▼2.6%	▲0.4%
	Fourth party	Fifth party
Leader	Michael Roolf	Udo Pastörs
Party	FDP	NPD
Last election	0 seats, 4.7%	0 seats, 0.8%
Seats won	7	6
Seat change	▲7	▲6
Popular vote	78,440	59,845
Percentage	9.6%	7.3%
Swing	▲4.9%	▲6.5%
- Results for the single-member constituencies
Minister-President before election
Harald Ringstorff
SPD
Elected Minister-President
Harald Ringstorff
SPD

The 2006 Mecklenburg-Vorpommern state election was held on 17 September 2006 to elect the members of the 5th Landtag of Mecklenburg-Vorpommern. The incumbent coalition government of the Social Democratic Party (SPD) and Party of Democratic Socialism (PDS) led by Minister-President Harald Ringstorff was returned with a reduced majority. However, the SPD chose not to continue the coalition. They instead formed a grand coalition with the Christian Democratic Union (CDU). Ringstorff was subsequently re-elected as Minister-President.

The neo-Nazi National Democratic Party of Germany (NPD) won 6 seats.

== Issues and campaign ==
The economy was a major issue throughout the campaign. Mecklenburg-Vorpommern's unemployment rate was among the worst in Germany. The possibility of the far-right NPD entering the parliament also became an issue late in the campaign, with all established parties condemning it.

== Parties ==
The table below lists parties represented in the 4th Landtag of Mecklenburg-Vorpommern.

Name		Ideology	Leader(s)	2002 result	
Name		Ideology	Leader(s)	Votes (%)	Seats
SPD	Social Democratic Party of Germany; Sozialdemokratische Partei Deutschlands	Social democracy	Harald Ringstorff	20.6%	33 / 71
CDU	Christian Democratic Union of Germany; Christlich Demokratische Union Deutschlands	Christian democracy	Jürgen Seidel	31.4%	25 / 71
PDS	Party of Democratic Socialism; Partei des Demokratischen Sozialismus	Democratic socialism	Wolfgang Methling	16.4%	13 / 71

== Opinion polling ==
Polling firm	Fieldwork date	Sample size	SPD	CDU	PDS	FDP	Grüne	NPD	Others	Lead
2006 state election	17 Sep 2006	–	30.2	28.8	16.8	9.6	3.4	7.3	3.9	1.4
Emnid	5–7 Sep 2006	500	29	31	21	7	3	7	2	2
Forschungsgruppe Wahlen	4–7 Sep 2006	1,116	29	33	18	7	4	7	2	4
Infratest dimap	4–6 Sep 2006	1,000	31	30	20	7	4	6	2	1
Infratest dimap	27–30 Aug 2006	1,000	30	31	21	6	4	6	2	1
Emnid	22–24 Aug 2006	500	28	31	23	7	3	4	4	3
Infratest dimap	20–23 Aug 2006	1,000	31	30	23	6	3	4	3	1
Forsa	16–18 Aug 2006	1,003	28	30	24	7	4	4	3	2
Emnid	7–10 Aug 2006	500	29	31	22	7	4	3	4	2
Infratest dimap	31 Jul–2 Aug 2006	1,000	29	33	22	6	4	4	2	4
Emnid	5–12 Jul 2006	1,001	31	33	21	7	4	–	4	2
Infratest dimap	10–11 Jul 2006	1,000	31	32	21	7	4	–	5	1
Emnid	19–30 May 2006	1,009	30	31	23	7	4	4	1	1
Infratest	November 2005	1,000	34	29	24	5	4	–	4	5
Emnid	5–8 Sep 2005	500	26	35	25	5	4	–	5	9
Emnid	22–25 Aug 2005	500	22	32	31	6	5	–	4	1
Emnid	8–11 Aug 2005	500	20	31	34	6	6	–	3	3
Emnid	25 Sep 2004	750	28	31	21	5	7	3	5	3
Infratest dimap	1–6 Jun 2004	1,003	29	44	15	5	5	–	2	15
Emnid	8 May 2004	752	28	39	17	6	7	–	3	11
Emnid	7 Nov 2003	750	26	41	19	5	6	–	3	15
Emnid	21 Jun 2003	750	35	37	14	5	5	–	4	2
Emnid	1 Mar 2003	?	33	40	14	5	4	–	4	7
2002 state election	22 Sep 2002	–	40.6	31.4	16.4	4.7	2.6	0.8	3.5	9.2

== Election result ==
Summary of the 17 September 2006 election results for the Landtag of Mecklenburg-Vorpommern
Party	Votes	%	+/-	Seats	+/-	Seats %
Social Democratic Party (SPD)	247,312	30.2	▼10.4	23	▼10	32.4
Christian Democratic Union (CDU)	235,530	28.8	▼2.6	22	▼3	31.0
Party of Democratic Socialism (PDS)	137,253	16.8	▲0.4	13	0	18.3
Free Democratic Party (FDP)	78,440	9.6	▲4.9	7	▲7	9.9
National Democratic Party (NPD)	59,845	7.3	▲6.5	6	▲6	8.5
Alliance 90/The Greens (Grüne)	27,642	3.4	▲0.8	0	±0	0
Family Party (Familie)	9,463	1.2	▲1.2	0	±0	0
Others	22,756	2.8		0	±0	0
Total	818,061	100.0		71	±0	
Voter turnout		59.2	▼11.4			

Popular Vote
SPD	30.23%
CDU	28.77%
PDS	16.78%
FDP	9.59%
NPD	7.32%
GRÜNE	3.38%
Other	3.94%

Landtag seats
SPD	32.39%
CDU	30.99%
PDS	18.31%
FDP	9.86%
NPD	8.45%

== See also ==
- 2004 Saxony state election

== Sources ==
- Election Results from the Landtag of Mecklenburg - Western Pomerania (in German)
- Landtagswahl Mecklenburg-Vorpommern (in German)
