= Peter Schreiber (politician) =

German politician (1973–)

Leader of the Die Heimat
- Incumbent
- Assumed office 2024
- Preceded by: multi-member district
- Succeeded by: multi-member district

Personal details
- Born: 14 April 1973 Berlin-Wilmersdorf,West-Berlin
- Party: Die Republikaner (1997-2007); NPD (since 2007)
- Spouse: yes
- Occupation: Politician

Peter Schreiber is a German publicist and far-right politician. Since November 2024, he has served as the federal chairman of the far-right party Die Heimat (formerly the NPD). He is the managing director of the publishing company Deutsche Stimme Verlagsgesellschaft mbH and is also active in the secessionist organization "Freie Sachsen".

== Live and Carrer ==
Peter Schreiber was born 1973 in Berlin-Wilmersdorf, West-Berlin. He grew up in Hesse. He worked for the Hesse Finacial direction and studied administration at Verwaltungsfachhochschule in Rotenburg an der Fulda, graduating in 1996. In 2000 the state Frankfurt Regional Finance Office denied a appointment as a civil servant because of his disloyalty to the constitution. He filed a legal challenge, won his case, but nonetheless left the civil service in 2021.

Up from 2001 he worked for Verlag Nation Europa and was editor for the magazine Nation und Europa. From 2004 to 2007 he was spokesperson for the far-right Network „Coburger Runde“. Since 2007 he worked for Deutsche Stimme Verlagsgesellschaft mbH in Riesa tätig, since 2012 as CEO. He was also adviser for NPD-fraction in Landtag of Saxony.

From 1997 to 2001, Schreiber was a member of The Republicans (Die Republikaner) and the youth organization Republican Youth (Republikanische Jugend – RJ).

In 2007, he joined the NPD, which was renamed "Die Heimat" in 2023. At the 2024 federal party conference in Riesa, he was elected federal chairman, receiving 88.4% of the vote. In the 2024 European election, he ran as a candidate for Die Heimat and advocated for Germany’s withdrawal from the EU ("Dexit").

Schreiber is involved with the breakaway regionalist group "Freie Sachsen" (Free Saxons). Since the Alternative for Germany is the main far-right party in all over Germany, Schreiber is banking on a strategic cooperation between "Die Heimat" and the "Freie Sachsen", as well as the transformation of the party into an "anti-party movement". Consequently, "Die Heimat" opted not to field its own list in the 2024 Saxony state election, while Schreiber himself ran as a direct candidate for the "Freie Sachsen."
