= Die Heimat =

Far-right neo-Nazi political party in Germany

The Homeland Die Heimat
- Party Chairman: Peter Schreiber
- Founders: Waldemar Schütz; Adolf von Thadden; ...and others
- Founded: 28 November 1964; 61 years ago
- Merger of: Deutsche Reichspartei; DNVP (1962)
- Newspaper: Deutsche Stimme
- Youth wing: Junge Nationalisten
- Membership: ▼3,000 (2022 est.)
- Ideology: Neo-Nazism; German Ultranationalism
- Political position: Far-right
- European affiliation: Alliance for Peace and Freedom
- European Parliament group: Non-Inscrits
- Colors: Gold; Brown (customary, as NPD); White
- Slogan: Die soziale Heimatpartei ('The Social Homeland Party')
- Bundestag: 0 / 630
- Bundesrat: 0 / 69
- State Parliaments: 0 / 1,821
- European Parliament: 0 / 96

Party flag

Website
- die-heimat.de

The Homeland (German: Die Heimat), formerly the National Democratic Party of Germany (German: Nationaldemokratische Partei Deutschlands, NPD), is a far-right, neo-Nazi and ultranationalist political party in Germany. It was founded in 1964 as successor to the German Reich Party (Deutsche Reichspartei, DRP). On 1 January 2011, the nationalist German People's Union merged with the NPD and the party name of the National Democratic Party of Germany was extended by the addition of "The People's Union". In June 2023, the party renamed itself to Die Heimat after a party vote. A splinter party, the National Democratic Party of Germany, emerged from party dissidents opposed to the change and retain the symbols and name of the NPD.

As a neo-Nazi organization, it has been referred to as "the most significant neo-Nazi party to emerge after 1945". The German Federal Agency for Civic Education, or BPB, has criticized the NPD for working with members of organizations which were later found unconstitutional by the federal courts and disbanded, while the Federal Office for the Protection of the Constitution (BfV), Germany's domestic security agency, classifies The Homeland as a "threat to the constitutional order" because of its platform and ideology, and it is under their observation. An effort to outlaw the party failed in 2003, as the government had many informers and agents in the party, some in high position, who had written part of the material used against them.

Since its founding in 1964, the party has never managed to win enough votes on the federal level to cross Germany's 5% minimum threshold for representation in the Bundestag; it has succeeded in crossing the 5% threshold and gaining representation in state parliaments 11 times, including one-convocation entry to seven West German state parliaments between November 1966 and April 1968 and two-convocation electoral success in two East German states of Saxony and Mecklenburg-Vorpommern between 2004 and 2011. Since 2016, The Homeland has not been represented in state parliaments. Udo Voigt led the NPD from 1996 to 2011. He was succeeded by Holger Apfel, who in turn was replaced by Udo Pastörs in December 2013. In November 2014, Pastörs was ousted and Frank Franz became the party's leader and in 2024 he was succeeded by Peter Schreiber.

Voigt was elected the party's first Member of the European Parliament in 2014. The party lost the seat in the 2019 European Parliament election.

On 23 January 2024, the Federal Constitutional Court excluded the party from party funding for six years, arguing that it continued to oppose the fundamental principles that are indispensable for the free democratic constitutional state and aimed to eliminate them.

== History ==
=== 20th century ===
NPD logo until the end of 2010

In the 1950s, despite the lack of complete de-Nazification, early right-wing extremist parties in West Germany failed to attract voters away from the moderate government that had presided over Germany's recovery.

Adolf von Thadden, an artillery officer in World War II and Nazi Party member, was active in far-right politics in the West Germany and was elected to the Bundestag in 1949. Thadden supported Werner Naumann, an associate of Joseph Goebbels, after his arrest and included him on the Deutsche Reichspartei's (DRP) list of candidates for the 1953 election. However, the government removed Naumann as a candidate and the party only received around 1% of the vote. Thadden then worked with Wilhelm Meinberg, a Nazi Reichstag member and recipient of the Golden Party Badge, and Heinrich Kunstmann, who joined the Nazi Party before Adolf Hitler. Both Meinberg and Kunstmann served as chairs of the DRP. Thadden replaced Kunstmann as chair in 1961 after continued electoral failures. Thadden's DRP allied with the BHE and German Party (DP) for the 1951 Bremen elections as none of the parties were strong enough to win on their own. This alliance received 5.2% of the vote and gained 4 seats in the bürgerschaft.

On 28 November 1964, around 600 people met in the banqueting hall of the Döhrener Maschpark inn in Bonn at the invitation of Friedrich Thielen. The National Democratic Party of Germany was formed at this meeting and 437 of those in attendance became members although they were allowed to maintain their membership in other parties. Thielen was selected to be chair of the party. Thadden, who proposed the unification of Germany's far-right parties, was made deputy chair. The newspaper he co-owned, Deutsche Nachrichten became the NPD's newspaper. The DRP, BHE, DP, and German National People's Party merged into the NPD. The NPD was organized in 196 of 248 federal election districts by April 1965. The party's first convention was held on 7–9 May 1965 in Hannover with 1,007 delegates and 2,000 non-delegates in attendance while. The party's membership of 7,500 was far smaller than the Christian Democratic Union (CDU)'s 390,000 and Social Democratic Party's 700,000. 8 of the NDP's 18 national committee members were former members of the NSDAP.

Thadden believed that 30% of the national voting public were undecided and that 15% could be swayed to support the NPD in the 1965 federal election. He launched a national car convoy for the campaign, starting in Cologne. Thielen and other members of the party laid wreathes on the graves of Nazi war criminals at Landsberg Prison. High profile people joined the party, such as Olympic gold medalist Frank Schepke and rocket pioneer Hermann Oberth. The NPD received 2% of the vote, below the 5% needed to gain seats and the 15% claimed in party propaganda.

Thadden served as chairman from 1967 to 1971. Owing to von Thadden's effective leadership the NPD achieved success in the late 1960s, winning local government seats across West Germany. A rise in unemployment from 105,000 in August 1966, to 673,000 in February 1967, helped the NDP grow and earn 8 seats in the Landtag of Hesse and became the third-largest party in the Landtag of Bavaria with 15 seats.

Helping pave the way for these NPD gains were an economic downturn, frustrations with the emerging leftist youth counter-culture, and the emergence of a tripartite Grand Coalition among the center-right Christian Democratic Union (CDU), the Christian Social Union (the CDU's present-day sister party), and the center-left Social Democratic Party (SPD). The coalition government had created a vacuum in the traditional political right wing, which the NPD tried to fill. Additionally, the party benefited from hostility to the growing immigrant population and fears that the government would relinquish claims to the "lost territories" (pre-World War II German territory east of the Oder-Neisse River). However, the growing popularity of the Kiesinger cabinet and improvements in the economy, with unemployment falling to 576,000 in March 1967, harmed the NDP's electoral prospects.

In late 1967, Thielen wanted somebody other than Thadden to lead the party in Lower Saxony, but Thadden ignored this and was elected chair on 5 February. The former chair, Lothar Kühne, and Fritz Winkelmann sued stating that Thadden was in violation of the NDP's bylaws. The court ruled in Kühne's favor on 8 March, and restored him as chair. On 10 March, Thielen had Thadden expelled from the party alongside seven other members, but the next day Thadden used his allies in the executive committee to expel Thielen and Harbord Grone-Endebrock, an ally of Thadden, was made chair in Lower Saxony. Thielen broke away to form the Nationale Volkspartei (NVP), but only a few hundred of the NPD's 25,000 members joined him. Franz Florian Winter, the chair of the Bavarian affiliate, resigned a few months later stating that the party was under the control of right-wing extremists. At the NDP's 3rd national convention in November 1967, Thadden was elected chair by 93% of the delegates.

The NDP received 4.3% of the vote in the 1969 federal election, but failed to gain any seats. When the grand coalition fell apart, around 75 percent of those who had voted for the NPD drifted back to the center-right. During the 1970s, the NPD went into decline, suffering from an internal split over failing to get into the German Parliament. The issue of immigration spurred a small rebound in popular interest from the mid-1980s to the early 1990s, but the party only saw limited success in various local elections.

=== 2000s ===
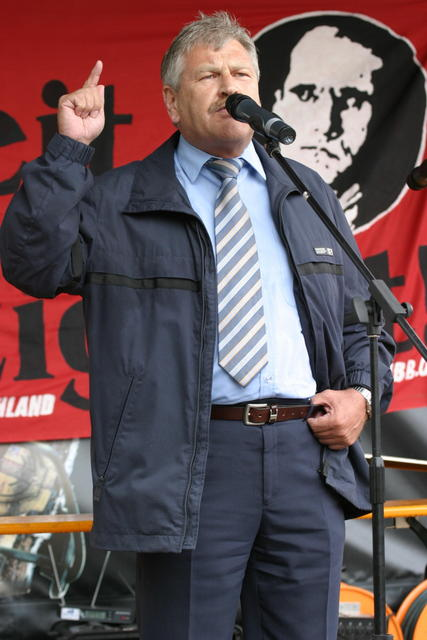
Udo Voigt, former leader of the NPD, stands in front of a banner depicting Nazi leader Rudolf Hess. Hess, who died in prison in 1987, is considered a martyr by the NPD, and the party attempted to nominate him for a Nobel Peace Prize in 2007.

In the 2004 state election in Saxony, the NPD won 9.2% of the overall vote. After the 2009 state election in Saxony, the NPD sent eight representatives to the Saxony state parliament, having lost four representatives since the 2004 election. The NPD lost their representation in Saxony in the 2014 state election. They also lost all representation in Mecklenburg-Vorpommern in the 2016 state election.

The NPD maintained a non-competition agreement with the German People's Union (DVU) between 2004 and 2009. The third nationalist-oriented party, the Republicans (REP), has so far refused to join this agreement. However, Kerstin Lorenz, a local representative of the Republicans in Saxony, sabotaged her party's registration to help the NPD in the Saxony election.

In the 2005 federal elections, the NPD received 1.6 percent of the vote nationally. It garnered the highest percent of votes in the states of Saxony (4.9 percent), Thuringia (3.7 percent), Mecklenburg-Vorpommern (3.5 percent) and Brandenburg (3.2 percent), all formerly part of East Germany. In most other states, the party won around 1 percent of the total votes cast. In the 2006 Mecklenburg-Vorpommern state election, the NPD received 7.3% of the vote and thus achieved state representation there, as well.

The NPD had 5,300 registered party members in 2004. Over the course of 2006, the NPD processed roughly 2,000 party applications to push the membership total over 7,200. In 2008, the trend of a growing number of members has been reversed and the party's membership is estimated at 7,000.

In the 2014 European elections, Udo Voigt was elected as the party's first Member of the European Parliament.

In September 2019, NPD politician Stefan Jagsch was elected as representative of Altenstadt-Waldsiedlung. The unanimous election of the NPD politician by the local council led to irritation and horror in other parties, such as Angela Merkel's Christian Democratic Union (CDU), the center-left Social Democrats (SPD), and the liberal Free Democratic Party (FDP), whose local council members had voted for Jagsch.

==== Merger with DVU ====
Logo of the NPD after its merger with the DVU until 2013

At the 2010 NPD party conference at Bamberg it was announced that the party would ask its members to approve a merger with the German People's Union (DVU). After the merger on 1 January 2011, the combined party briefly used the name NPD – Die Volksunion (NPD - The People's Union). Between 2004 and 2009 the two parties had agreed not to compete against each other in elections. However, on 27 January 2011, Munich's Landgericht (regional court) in a preliminary injunction declared the merger null and void.

Logo of the NPD 2013–2023

==== Banning attempts ====
In 2001, the federal government, the Bundestag, and the Bundesrat jointly attempted to have the Federal Constitutional Court of Germany ban the NPD. The court, the highest court in Germany, has the exclusive power to ban parties if they are found to be "anti-constitutional" through the Basic Law for the Federal Republic of Germany. However, the petition was rejected in 2003 after it was discovered that a number of the NPD's inner circle, including as many as 30 of its top 200 leaders, were undercover agents or informants of the German secret services, like the federal Bundesamt für Verfassungsschutz. They include a former deputy chairman of the party and author of an anti-Semitic tract that formed a central part of the government's case. Since the secret services were unwilling to fully disclose their agents' identities and activities, the court found it impossible to decide which moves by the party were based on genuine party decisions and which were controlled by the secret services in an attempt to further the ban. The court determined that so many of the party's actions were influenced by the government that the resulting "lack of clarity" made it impossible to defend a ban. "The presence of the state at the leadership level makes influence on its aims and activities unavoidable," it concluded.

Horst Mahler, a former member of the far-left terrorist organization Red Army Faction, defended the NPD in court. In May 2009, several state politicians published an extensive document which they claim proves the NPD's opposition to the constitution without relying on information supplied by undercover agents. This move was intended to lead up to a second attempt to have the NPD banned.

In 2011, authorities were reportedly trying to link the party, and specifically 30-year-old national organization director Patrick Wieschke, to the so-called "Zwickau terrorist cell". This raised the possibility of another effort to outlaw the party. The cell had been implicated in a string of murders and the November robbery of a savings bank in Eisenach. Authorities were also pursuing a gun case against Ralf Wohlleben, former deputy chairman of the party's branch in Thuringia, though the latter case was reportedly unlikely to translate into a national-level challenge to the party's legal standing. The likelihood of success of renewed banning attempts has been questioned, given the Office for the Protection of the Constitution has over 130 informants in the party, some in high positions, raising the question of whether the party is effectively controlled by the government.

German officials tried to outlaw the party again in December 2012, with the interior ministers of all 16 states recommending a ban. The Federal Constitutional Court is yet to vote on the recommendation. In March 2013 the Merkel government said it would not try to ban the NPD.

German officials again tried to outlaw the NPD by submitting a request to the Federal Constitutional Court in 2016.

On 17 January 2017, the second senate of the Federal Constitutional Court rejected the attempt to outlaw the party. The reasoning behind the decision was that the NPD's political significance is virtually nonexistent at both the state and federal levels and that as such, the party had no chance of posing a significant threat to the constitutional order. It was also reasoned that outlawing the party would not change the mindset and political ideology of its members and supporters, who in the event of a ban could simply form a new movement under a different name. However, the Court also openly acknowledged that NPD is unconstitutional based on its manifesto and ideology, citing "links to neo-Nazism" and that "anti-semitism was a structural element of the party ideology" in its reasoning. The Court also indirectly suggested that state grants or other financial contributions should not be given to such parties to further their unconstitutional cause. This prompted calls by the public for the proposal of a constitutional amendment which would forbid unconstitutional parties' financing to the Basic Law for the Federal Republic of Germany. The proposal was criticized by the interior policy spokesman of Die Linke, who claimed that such a constitutional amendment could stand to serve as a politically dubious way to remove a political opponent. Constitutional law professor Hans Herbert von Arnim warned that such a constitutional amendment would apply to all extra-parliamentary parties, not just the NPD.

The German legislative bodies then created the possibility of a funding freeze for parties after the second NPD ban procedure failed in 2017. In 2019, the Bundestag, Bundesrat and federal government jointly submitted a proposal to exclude the NPD from state funding. In January 2024 the Federal Constitutional Court allowed the freezing of state funding for six years, saying that the party "aimed to undermine or eliminate the country's democratic system".

The German Federal Constitutional Court, in its verdict, considered the party's demand for a referendum on the reintroduction of capital punishment as anti-constitutional and incompatible with the liberal democratic basic order.

=== 2023 renaming to Die Heimat ===
The party renamed itself to Die Heimat ("The Homeland") at the party congress in Riesa in early June 2023. 77% voted in favor of the name change. Shortly after this vote, many of those that were opposed to the name change founded a new party to continue under the old name, the National Democratic Party of Germany (NPD).

The Party did not run in the 2025 German federal election.

== Platform and ideology ==
The Homeland is a neo-Nazi political party. It calls itself a party of "grandparents and grandchildren" because the 1960s generation in Germany, known for the leftist student movement, strongly opposes the NPD's policies. The NPD's economic program promotes social security for Germans and control against plutocracy. They discredit and reject the "liberal-capitalist system".

The Homeland’s foreign policy outlook is characterized by ultranationalism, revisionism, and isolationism. The party views the defense and restoration of national sovereignty as the guiding principle of its foreign policy and opposes international organizations, norms, and alliances that it believes infringe upon Germany’s national sovereignty. The Homeland argues that NATO fails to represent the interests and needs of European people. The party considers the European Union to be little more than a reorganization of a Soviet-style government of Europe along financial lines. Although highly critical of the EU, as long as Germany remains a part of it, The Homeland opposes Turkey's incorporation into the organization. Voigt envisions future collaboration and continued friendly relations with other nationalists and European nationalist parties. The Homeland is strongly anti-Zionist, frequently criticizing the policies and activities of Israel.

The Homeland's platform asserts that Germany is larger than the present-day Federal Republic, and calls for a return of German territory lost after World War II, a foreign policy position abandoned by the German government in 1990.

In the early 21st century, long-standing efforts to ban the party were renewed. The 2005 report of the Federal Office for the Protection of the Constitution contains the following description:

The party continues to pursue a "people's front" of the nationalists [consisting of] the NPD, DVU, and forces not attached to any party, which is supposed to develop into a base for an encompassing 'German people's movement'. The aggressive agitation of the NPD unabashedly aims towards the abolition of parliamentary democracy and the democratic constitutional state, although the use of violence is currently still officially rejected for tactical reasons. Statements of the NPD document an essential affinity with Nazism; its agitation is racist, antisemitic, homophobic, revisionist, and intends to disparage the democratic and lawful order of the constitution.

=== Green movement ===
The Homeland has supported the green movement. This is one of many strategies the party has used to try to gain supporters. Historically the opposing party the German Greens have fully supported the green movement in Germany. The German Greens group was a successful European ecological group that began in 1980. Kate Connolly who is a correspondent for The Guardian wrote the article: German far-right extremists tap into green movement for support. In the article Connolly explains the opposition between these two political groups pertaining to the green movement. The Artaman League is essential in understanding the green movements history. This was a farming movement that was inspired by the "blood and soil" ruralist ideology adopted from the Nazis. This farming movement affected the Mecklenburg region of Germany during the 19th century. Settlers at this time took advantage of the cheap cost of land in these rural communities. These settlers were in support of the Artaman league and continued to reinforce the ideology.

The NPD's plans are to take the ecological movement back from the German Greens group. Connolly spoke to different farmers, organizations, and employees of the government to represent the different perspectives of the ecological movement. Hans-Gunter Laimer, a farmer who ran for office for the NPD, mentions his frustration that the German Greens groups has dominated the organic farming market for too long. He has also been linked to other German groups specifically Umwelt and Aktiv. Both political parties are concerned with the ways they are in opposition to one another. The Homeland supporters of the green movement are in favor of local produce. However, they are against GMOs, pesticides, and intensive livestock. Organizations involved in the farming industry have lost consumers because they are not able to state what the political views of the farmers products are to the consumer. For example, BioPark is an organic cultivation organization with a vetting process to certify organic farmers. The vetting process is strictly based on cultivation methods and not on political affiliations. BioPark has lost customers because left-leaning supporters worry buying local organic produce is supporting the far-right extremist.

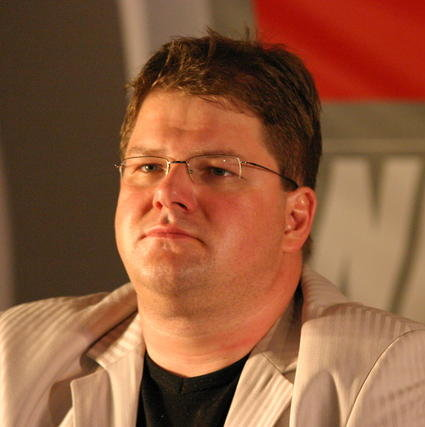
Holger Apfel, NPD leader from 2011 to 2013

The department of rural enlightenment has supported the importance of distinguishing between these two political parties. The department created a brochure called "Nature Conservation Versus Right-wing Extremist". The brochure was created in order to help consumers distinguish from the far-right extremists. Other representatives from the government have spoken on this divide. For example, Connolly mentions a representative of the Centre for Democratic culture in Mecklenburg who chose to stay anonymous in order to protect themselves. The representative stated the goal of the NPD is to build bridges between citizens. The NPD is strategic in the way they are going about this in a subtle quite manner. The result the NPD is trying to achieve is to reinforce the division between the two political parties for when NPD no longer becomes associated with politics.

== Controversies ==
=== Holocaust denial ===
Josef Truxa, the chair of the NPD in Munich, denied on 18 June 1965, that the Nazis committed any crimes and that it was propaganda by Jews.

=== 2012 Thor Steinar clothing ===
In June 2012, several NPD members of Saxony's parliament attended the parliament's sittings wearing clothing from Thor Steinar, a clothing brand that is popular amongst neo-Nazis; the legislature responded by saying that such provocative clothing was not permitted to be worn in the parliament and demanded that the NPD's members remove and replace their attire; the NPD's members refused, resulting in the members being expelled from the parliament and banned from attending the next three parliamentary sittings. The NPD members denied accusations that they wore the shirts as a deliberate provocation.

=== World War II and Holocaust commemoration controversies ===
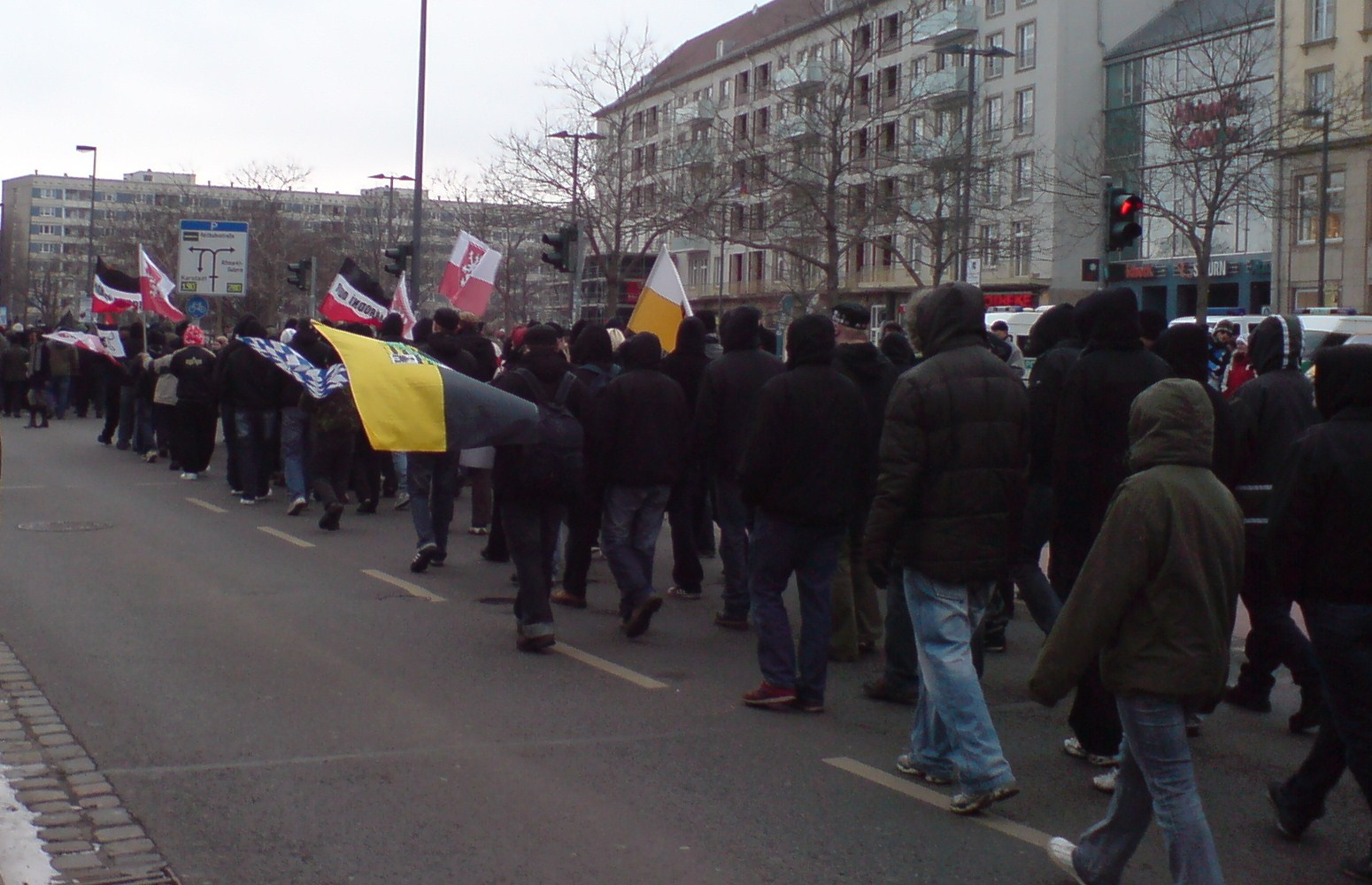
Supporters of the NPD and other protesters in Dresden, 2009

In 2005, the Landtag of Saxony held a minute of silence for the victims of Nazi Germany. Holger Apfel, leader of the NPD in Saxony and deputy leader of the party nationwide, boycotted the remembrance along with 11 other NPD politicians and staged a walkout from the Landtag chamber. He also gave a speech in which he demanded a moment of silence be held for the victims of the bombing of Dresden in 1945 and called the Allies of World War II "mass murderers", stating that "Today we in this parliament are taking up the political battle for historical truth, and against the servitude of guilt of the German people... The causes of the holocaust bombing of Dresden have nothing to do with either 1 September 1939 or with 30 January 1933." Apfel's speech caused politicians from other parties in the Landtag to walk out in protest.

Udo Voigt voiced his support for Apfel's and reiterated the statement, which some controversially claimed was a violation of the German law which forbids Holocaust denial. However, after a judicial review, it was decided that Voigt's description of the Allied bombing of Dresden as a "holocaust" was an exercise of free speech and "defamation of the dead" was not the purpose of his statement.

In 2009, the NPD joined the Junge Landsmannschaft Ostdeutschland in a demonstration on the anniversary of the bombing of Dresden in World War II. Roughly 6,000 people came to participate in the event.

=== Activism ===
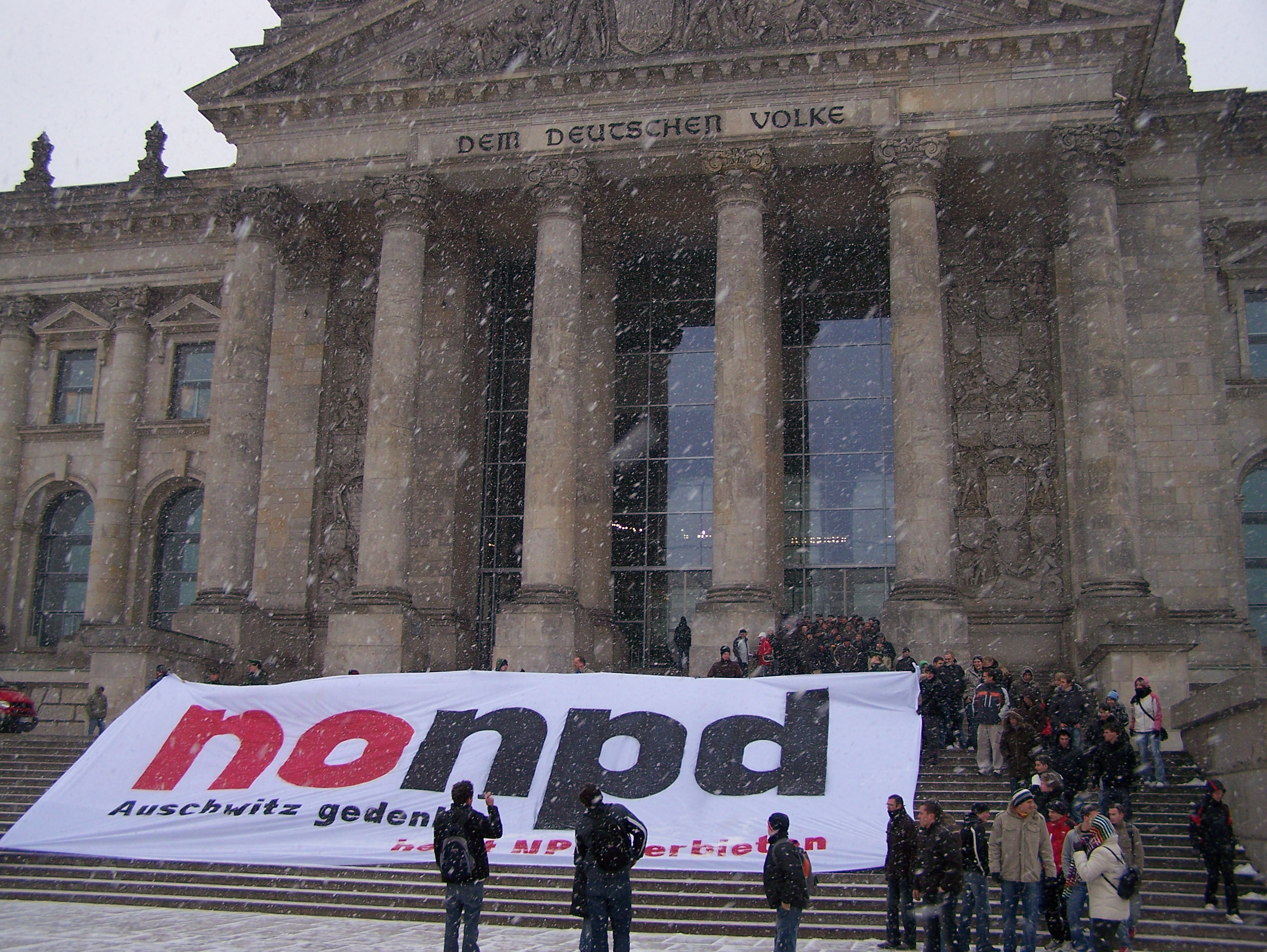
A 2007 Union of Persecutees of the Nazi Regime demonstration at the Reichstag. The banner reads "Auschwitz gedenken heißt NPD verbieten" ("Remembering Auschwitz means banning the NPD").

The NPD's strategy has been to create "nationally liberated zones" and circumvent its marginal electoral status by concentrating on regions where support is strongest. In March 2006, musician Konstantin Wecker tried to set up an in-school anti-fascist concert in Halberstadt, Saxony-Anhalt two weeks before the state elections. The NPD argued that because of politics, the date and the in-school venue, the concert "was an unacceptable form of political campaigning." In protest, the NPD vowed to buy the tickets and turn up en masse at Wecker's show, which led local authorities to cancel the event. The Social Democrats and the Greens were outraged by the decision, which the Central Council of Jews in Germany criticized as "politically bankrupt".

The NPD was going to sponsor a march through Leipzig on 21 June 2006, as the 2006 World Cup was going on. The party wanted to show its support for the Iranian national football team, which was playing in Leipzig, and Iranian President Mahmoud Ahmadinejad. However, the NPD decided against the demonstration; only a counter-demonstration took place that day, in support of Israel. During the World Cup, the party's web site stated that due to the prevalence of people of non-German descent on the Germany national football team, the team "was not really German".

Later in 2006, the party designed leaflets, which said "White – not just the color of a jersey! For a true National team!" This leaflet was never mass-distributed, but copies were confiscated during a raid on the NPD's headquarters, when authorities had been hoping to find material linking the party to Nazism. Patrick Owomoyela was later informed about the poster after it was noted that the image depicted a footballer wearing a white jersey with Owomoyela's number on it. Owomoyela, of Nigerian descent, had played for the Germany national team in the years before the World Cup and proceeded to file a lawsuit against the party. The party was able to delay the procedures but in April 2009 three party officials, Udo Voigt, Frank Schwerdt, and Klaus Beier, were convicted of Volksverhetzung (incitement to hatred). Voigt and Beier were sentenced to 7 months of probation, and Schwerdt was sentenced to 10 months of probation. The convictions were overturned by the Berlin State Court in March 2011, judging that the number alone was not enough to link the leaflet to Owomoyela, and that "white" has other meanings including good moral character.

In November 2008, shortly after the 2008 United States presidential election, the NPD published a document entitled "Africa conquers the White House" which stated that the election of Barack Obama as the first African-American President of the United States was the result of "the American alliance of Jews and Negroes" and that Obama aimed to destroy the United States' "white identity". The NPD claimed, "A non-white America is a declaration of war on all people who believe an organically grown social order based on language and culture, history and heritage to be the essence of humanity" and "Barack Obama hides this declaration of war behind his pushy sunshine smile." The NPD also stated that the extensive support for Obama in Germany "resembles an African tropical disease."

In September 2009, another incident involving the NPD and a football player of the Germany national team was reported. In a television show of a regional channel, NPD spokesman Beier called midfielder Mesut Özil a "Plaste-Deutscher" ("Plastic German" or "ID Card German"), meaning someone who is not born German, but becomes German by naturalization, particularly for certain benefits. The German Football Association announced that they would immediately file a lawsuit against the NPD and their spokesman, if requested by Özil.

During the Gaza War in 2009, the NPD planned a "Holocaust" vigil for Gaza in support of the Palestinians. Charlotte Knobloch, the head of the Central Council of Jews in Germany, said "joint hatred of everything Jewish is unifying neo-Nazis and Islamists." Knobloch claimed German-Palestinian protestors "unashamedly admitted" that they would vote for the NPD during the next election.

In 2009, the NPD hung anti-Polish posters with slogan "Polen-Invasion Stoppen" ("Stop the Polish invasion") in Dresden and Görlitz. Mayor of Görlitz and then Chancellor of Germany, Angela Merkel, condemned the posters.

In April 2009, the party was fined 2.5 million euros for filing incorrect financial statements, resulting, according to German broadcaster Deutsche Welle, in "serious financial trouble" for its administration.

On 23 September 2009, four days before the federal elections, German police raided the Berlin headquarters of the NPD to investigate claims that letters sent from the NPD to politicians from immigrant backgrounds incited racial hatred. The NPD leader in Berlin defended the letters saying that "As part of a democracy, we're entitled to say if something doesn't suit us in this country."

On 24 June 2024, it was announced that two parliamentary groups consisting of members of the AfD and Die Heimat had been formed in the Brandenburg town of Lauchhammer and the district of Oberspreewald-Lausitz. In Lauchhammer, the joint parliamentary group will be represented in the town council under the name "AfDplus", while the "Heimat & Zukunft" parliamentary group has been formed in the district council of Oberspreewald-Lausitz. Thomas Gürtler from Die Heimat will play a leading role in both bodies. This development is seen as the first official coalition between the AfD and the far-right party Die Heimat. The formation of the parliamentary groups was supported by statements made by AfD chairman Tino Chrupalla, who emphasized that there would be no "firewalls" to other parties at local level.

In May 2026, the party sold its national headquarters in Berlin. It has retained properties in Essen-Kray and Eisenach where it holds social events and concerts. Observers suggested that the sale marked the end of the party's competitive aspirations in Berlin.

== Organization ==
=== Chairmen ===
Leader		Tenure
1	Friedrich Thielen	1964–1967
2	Adolf von Thadden	1967–1971
3	Martin Mussgnug	1971–1990
4	Günter Deckert	1991–1996
5	Udo Voigt	1996–2011
6	Holger Apfel	2011–2013
7	Udo Pastörs	2013–2014
8	Frank Franz	2014–2024
9	Peter Schreiber	2024-present

=== Youth wing ===
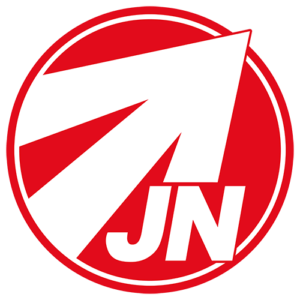
Logo of the youth wing since 2018

Junge Nationalisten (short: JN; until 13 January 2018 Junge Nationaldemokraten) is the official youth organization of the party, founded in 1967. According to The Homeland's statutes, the JN are an "integral part" of the party.

The JN are committed to the basic program of the party, but represent these points of view much more aggressively, which is evident both during demonstrations and in political style. They are observed by the Office for the Protection of the Constitution and classified as right-wing extremists. Their regular publication is called The Activist. In this central organ, under the heading "The Federal Leader Has the Word", they describe themselves as "representatives of the national revolutionary wing within the NPD". The youth organization criticizes those in The Homeland who have made the "fight for parliaments" the "most important goal". Instead, "resistance and criticism are appropriate, since these developments run the risk of gradual adjustment and bourgeoisie". The JN describe themselves as anti-imperialist. Among other things, they call for the withdrawal of German troops from Afghanistan, describe Israel as the "enemy of all peoples", and refer to it as becoming a parasitic state.

The JN maintains active contacts with a network of neo-Nazi organizations across Europe, like the Nordic Resistance Movement whose Finnish independence day march it has attended, where speakers eulogized the Waffen SS. The JN has also attended gathering with National Corps of Ukraine, Bulgarian National Union, Serbian Action and others.

=== Women's wing ===
In mid-September 2006, the Homeland founded a nationwide women's organization, the Ring Nationaler Frauen (RNF). The party sub-organization within the Homeland aims to act as a voice for female party members and provide a contact point for women who share nationalist views but are not affiliated with any political party. Since late May 2017, Antje Mentzel has served as the national chairperson of this organization.

=== Associated organizations ===
The Homeland runs its own "security service" (Ordungsdienst). The group is led by Manfred Börm.

==== Press organ and other party newspapers ====
The Homeland has had various newspapers throughout its history. The official press organ was initially the Deutsche Nachrichten. After a merger with the Deutsche Wochen-Zeitung (DWZ), bought by publisher and DVU chairman Gerhard Frey in 1986, it was renamed Deutsche Wochen-Zeitung - Deutscher Anzeiger. In 1999, it was merged with the National-Zeitung, also published by Frey. The National-Zeitung was discontinued in 2019.

The party's current press organ is Deutsche Stimme, which has been published since 1976 and currently has a monthly circulation of 10,000. There are also regional and local publications such as Sachsen-Stimme and Zündstoff-Nachrichten.

=== Finances ===
The NPD's party assets were only small. At the end of 2005, property worth around 700,000 euros was offset by a loan, guarantee and credit burden of around one million euros.

==== Shareholdings ====
The Homeland holds a 100 per cent stake in Deutsche Stimme Verlags GmbH in Riesa. The publishing house, originally based in Bavaria, publishes the party newspaper Deutsche Stimme as its main product.

==== Financial assets ====
The party is dependent on donations due to its low financial reserves. Its income from contributions amounts to only half a million euros and it receives around one million euros from donations and contributions from elected representatives. In 2005, the NPD received seven donations totaling more than 10,000 euros, mainly from its own Members of Parliament.

In late 2006, it was revealed that the German Bundestag administration demanded the return of approximately 870,000 euros in party financing from the party due to the issuance of fraudulent donation receipts in the Thuringia state association after 1996. These irregularities led to higher party financing, with false donations accounting for six percent of the total in 1997 and ten percent in 1998. Consequently, the Bundestag administration deemed the financial reports for these years to be significantly incorrect, leading to the complete recovery of the funding for those years. As a result of this financial crisis, the party dismissed ten of its twelve employees at the federal headquarters. Additionally, reports indicated that much of The Homeland's real estate assets were heavily mortgaged, potentially rendering them unusable as collateral for future party financing payments.

=== International connections ===
Voigt has held meetings with various proponents of white nationalism, including David Duke, a US white nationalist, author, politician, and activist. Between 1989 and 1992, the International Third Position began to ally itself with the NPD in Germany and Forza Nuova in Italy. Udo Voigt represented the NPD in the conference of far-right and neo-Nazi parties in Russia in 2015, known as the International Russian Conservative Forum. Participants included Golden Dawn, the Nordic Resistance Movement, the Russian Imperial Movement and others, as well as well known white supremacists from the United States such as Jared Taylor of American Renaissance and Brandon Russell of the Atomwaffen Division.

They have been in contact with Youth Defence, the Irish anti-abortion group, since 1996. Justin Barrett, former leader of Youth Defence and former president of the National Party of Ireland, has spoken at their events in Passau in 2000.

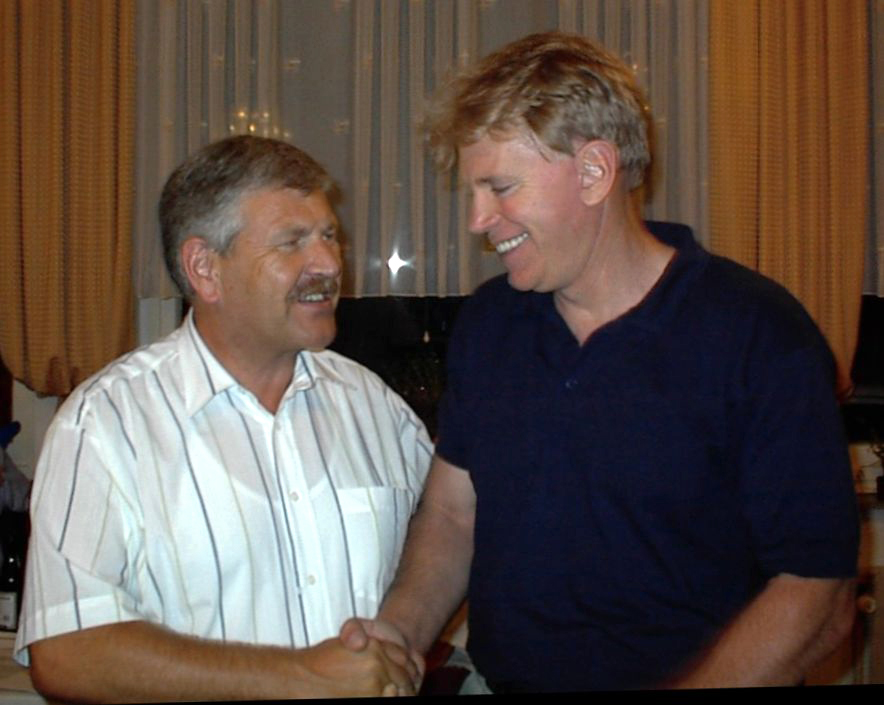
Udo Voigt and prominent American white nationalist David Duke

The Homeland has also links with the Romanian neo-Legionary group Noua Dreaptă.

The party has links with the Alliance for Peace and Freedom, a European political alliance since 2015.

==== Connections with Croatian far right ====
The party also has connections with far-right parties and politicians in Croatia. In 2017, according to Dražen Keleminec, president of the marginal far-right Autochthonous Croatian Party of Rights (A-HSP), NPD party member Alexander Neidlein took part in the party's march to show their support and declare allegiance to then-recently elected American president Donald Trump. During the march, the party's members, dressed in black uniforms, waved NPD and American flags while shouting the Ustasha salute Za dom spremni. The following day, the U.S. embassy in Zagreb reacted by publishing a statement in which they strongly condemned the march and rejected any attempts to connect the United States with Ustasha ideology.

In 2018, Croatian far-right MP Željko Glasnović took part in the NPD party congress in the town of Büdingen, and expressed his support for the party.

== Election results ==
NPD votes in the 2013 elections

=== Federal Parliament (Bundestag) ===
Election year	Constituency			Party list			Seats won
Election year	Votes	%	+/–	Votes	%	+/–	Seats won
1965	587,216	1.8	▲1.8	664,193	2.0	▲2.0	0 / 518
1969	1,189,375	3.6	▲1.8	1,422,010	4.3	▲2.3	0 / 518
1972	194,389	0.5	▼3.1	207,465	0.6	▼3.7	0 / 518
1976	136,023	0.4	▼0.1	122,661	0.3	▼0.3	0 / 518
1980				68,096	0.2	▼0.1	0 / 497
1983	57,112	0.1	▼0.3	91,095	0.2	0.0	0 / 498
1987	182,880	0.5	▲0.4	227,054	0.6	▲0.4	0 / 497
1990	190,105	0.4	▼0.1	145,776	0.3	▼0.3	0 / 662
1998	45,043	0.1	▼0.3	126,571	0.3	0.0	0 / 669
2002	103,209	0.2	▲0.1	215,232	0.4	▲0.1	0 / 603
2005	857,777	1.8	▲1.6	748,568	1.6	▲1.2	0 / 614
2009	768,442	1.8	0.0	635,525	1.5	▼0.1	0 / 620
2013	634,842	1.5	▼0.3	560,828	1.3	▼0.2	0 / 630
2017	45,239	0.1	▼1.4	176,715	0.4	▼0.9	0 / 709
2021	1,089	0.0	▼0.1	64,608	0.1	▼0.3	0 / 709
2025	Did not contest						0 / 630

=== European Parliament ===
Election	Votes	%	Seats	+/–	EP Group
1984	198,633	0.80 (#7)	0 / 81	New	–
1989	Did not contest		0 / 81	0	–
1994	77,227	0.22 (#19)	0 / 99	0	–
1999	107,662	0.40 (#10)	0 / 99	0	–
2004	241,743	0.94 (#11)	0 / 99	0	–
2009	Did not contest		0 / 81	0	–
2014	301,139	1.03 (#11)	1 / 99	▲1	NI
2019	101,323	0.27 (#16)	0 / 99	▼1	–
2024	41,006	0.10 (#27)	0 / 99	0	–

Best historic results for state parties
State	Seats / Total	%	Position/Gov.	Year	Lead Candidate
Baden-Württemberg	12 / 127	9.82 (#3)	Opposition	1968	Wilhelm Gutmann
Bavaria	15 / 204	7.42 (#3)	Opposition	1966	Siegfried Pöhlmann
Berlin (Note: Formerly part of East Germany)	0 / 149	2.56 (#8)	No seats	2006	Udo Voigt
Brandenburg	0 / 88	2.56 (#6)	No seats	2009	Klaus Beier
Bremen	8 / 100	8.8 (#4)	Opposition	1967	Otto-Theodor Brouwer
Hamburg	0 / 120	3.9 (#4)	No seats	1966	unknown
Hesse	8 / 96	7.9 (#4)	Opposition	1966	Heinrich Fassbender
Lower Saxony	10 / 149	7.0 (#3)	Opposition	1967	Adolf von Thadden
Mecklenburg-Vorpommern	6 / 71	7.3 (#5)	Opposition	2006	Udo Pastörs
North Rhine-Westphalia	0 / 200	1.08 (#4)	No seats	1970	unknown
Rhineland-Palatinate	4 / 100	6.9 (#4)	Opposition	1967	Fritz May
Saarland	0 / 51	4.0 (#5)	No seats	2004	Peter Marx
Saxony	12 / 124	9.2 (#4)	Opposition	2004	Holger Apfel
Saxony-Anhalt	0 / 105	4.6 (#5)	No seats	2011	Matthias Heyder
Schleswig-Holstein	4 / 73	5.85 (#4)	Opposition	1967	Karl-Ernst Lober
Thuringia	0 / 90	4.3 (#6)	No seats	2009	Frank Schwerdt

== Literature ==
- Ackermann, Robert: Warum die NPD keinen Erfolg haben kann – Organisation, Programm und Kommunikation einer rechtsextremen Partei. Budrich, Opladen 2012, ISBN 978-3-86388-012-5.
- Brandstetter, Marc: Die „neue" NPD: Zwischen Systemfeindschaft und bürgerlicher Fassade. Parteienmonitor Aktuell der Konrad-Adenauer-Stiftung. Bonn 2012 (online)
- Brandstetter, Marc: Die NPD unter Udo Voigt. Organisation. Ideologie. Strategie (= Extremismus und Demokratie. Bd. 25). Nomos Verlag, Baden-Baden 2013, ISBN 978-3-383-29708-3.
- Prasse, Jan-Ole: Der kurze Höhenflug der NPD. Rechtsextreme Wahlerfolge in den 1960er Jahren. Tectum-Verlag, Marburg 2010, ISBN 978-3-8288-2282-5.
- Philippsberg, Robert: Die Strategie der NPD: Regionale Umsetzung in Ost- und Westdeutschland. Baden-Baden 2009.
- apabiz e. V.: Die NPD – Eine Handreichung zu Programm, Struktur, Personal und Hintergründen. Zweite, aktualisierte Auflage. 2008. (online) (PDF; 671 kB)

== See also ==
- Far-right politics in Germany
- German nationalism
- Irredentism
- Frank Rennicke
- List of National Democratic Party of Germany politicians

== Works cited ==
- Nagle, John (1970). The National Democratic Party: Right Radicalism in the Federal Republic of Germany. University of California Press. ISBN 0520016491.
- Long, Wellington (1968). The New Nazis of Germany. Chilton Company.
