= National Democratic Party of Germany (2023) =

Far-right neo-Nazi political party in Germany

National Democratic Party of Germany Nationaldemokratische Partei Deutschlands
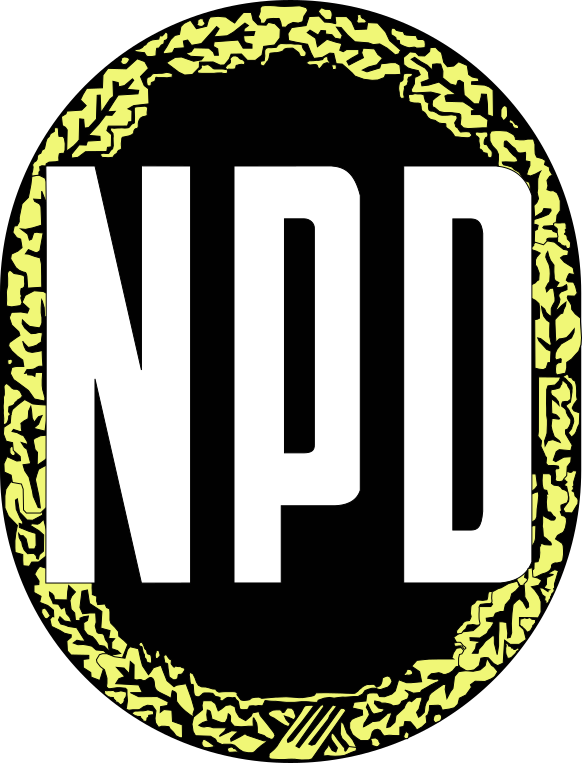
- Abbreviation: NPD
- Leader: Lennart Schwarzbach
- Founded: 3 June 2023
- Split from: The Homeland
- Newspaper: Stimme Deutschlands
- Youth wing: National Youth
- Membership (2025): >600
- Ideology: Neo-Nazism; Völkisch nationalism Antisemitism (German)
- Political position: Far-right
- Colors: Dark red
- Slogan: Die soziale Heimatpartei ('The social homeland party')
- Bundestag: 0 / 630
- Bundesrat: 0 / 69
- State Parliaments: 0 / 1,821
- European Parliament: 0 / 96

Party flag
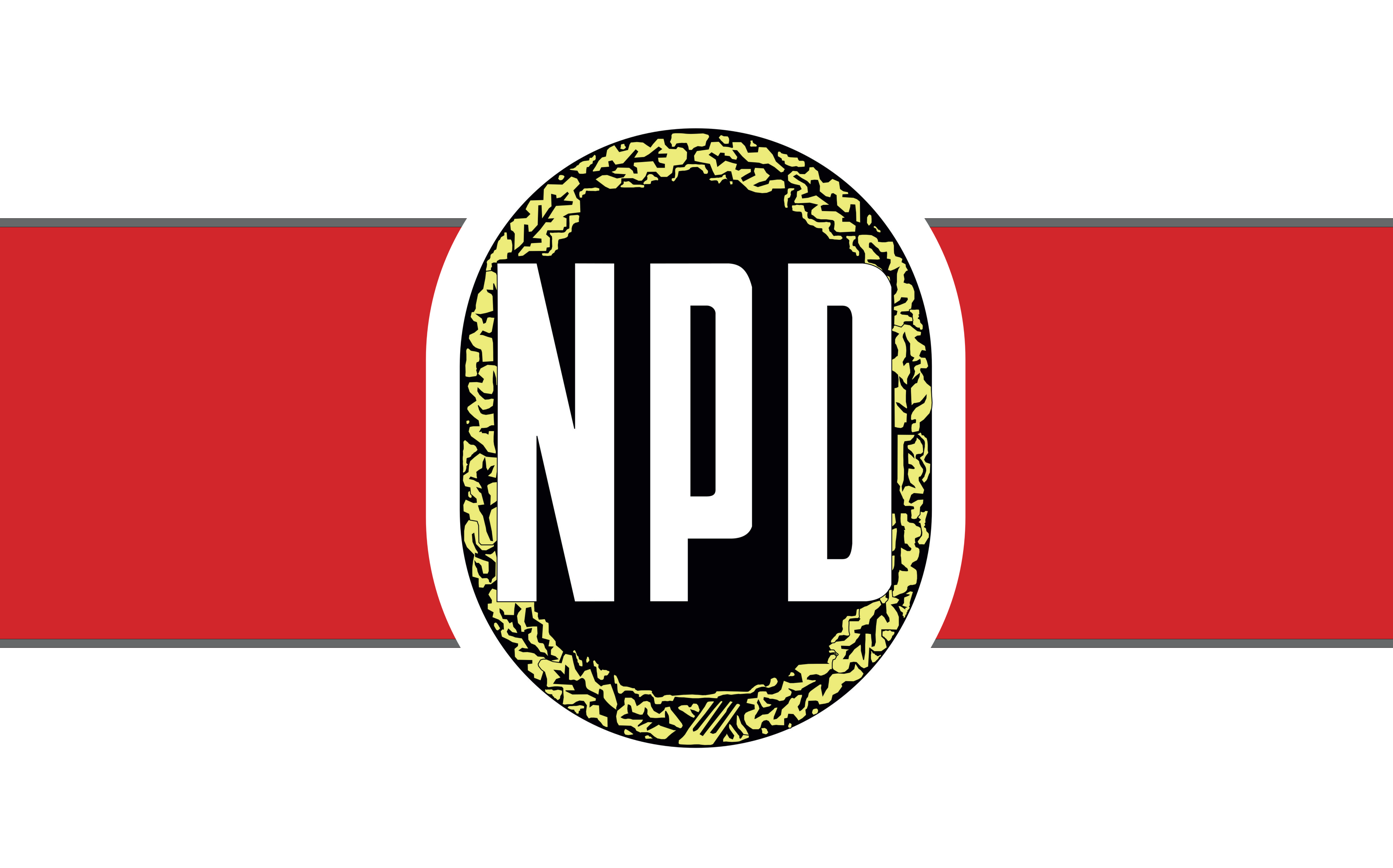

Website
- npd-voran.de

The National Democratic Party of Germany (German: Nationaldemokratische Partei Deutschlands), short-form: NPD, is a minor political party in Germany that was founded by dissidents that had split from the original NPD after it renamed to The Homeland. The founders of the NPD feared that The Homeland would moderate and integrate itself into mainstream politics and instead opted to re-found the NPD in order to provide people with a radical anti-system alternative that could continue the old NPD's legacy.

== History ==
After the renaming of the National Democratic Party of Germany (NPD) to The Homeland in June 2023, Lennart Schwarzbach, at the time leader of the NPD's Hamburg state branch, posted on Facebook that the Hamburg NPD would leave The Homeland. It was followed by other state- and regional branches that officially founded the new NPD under Schwarzbach's leadership at a federal congress in Lower Saxony on 26 November 2023. The party views itself as the legitimate successor to the old NPD. The party was registered with the Federal Returning Officer on 24 March 2024.

After The Right dissolved on 18 March 2025, many of its members, including its former leader Christian Worch, joined the NPD.

== Organisation ==
The leader of the NPD is Lennart Schwarzbach, other members of the party committee include Ingo Stawitz, Wolfgang Schimmel, Tim Belz, Holger Niemann, and Jochen Molitor. It has four registered state branches: Baden-Württemberg, Hamburg, Lower Saxony, and Saarland; in addition to several local branches. The state branch in Hamburg has around 90 members.

The party's youth wing, founded in 2025, is called the National Youth (German: Nationale Jugend, NJ) and is led by Jochen Molitor.

As of July 2025, the party claims to have more than 600 members.

== Ideology ==
The 2023 NPD is considered far-right. According to the State Office for the Protection of the Constitution of Hamburg, the party is "considerably more neo-Nazi" and "even closer to traditional neo-Nazi ideology" than its predecessor.

== Election results ==
=== State elections ===
Year	HH	
Year	Votes	%
2025	1,680	0.0

== See also ==
- Die Heimat
- Far-right politics in Germany (1945–present)
