= Udo Voigt =

German politician (1952–2025)

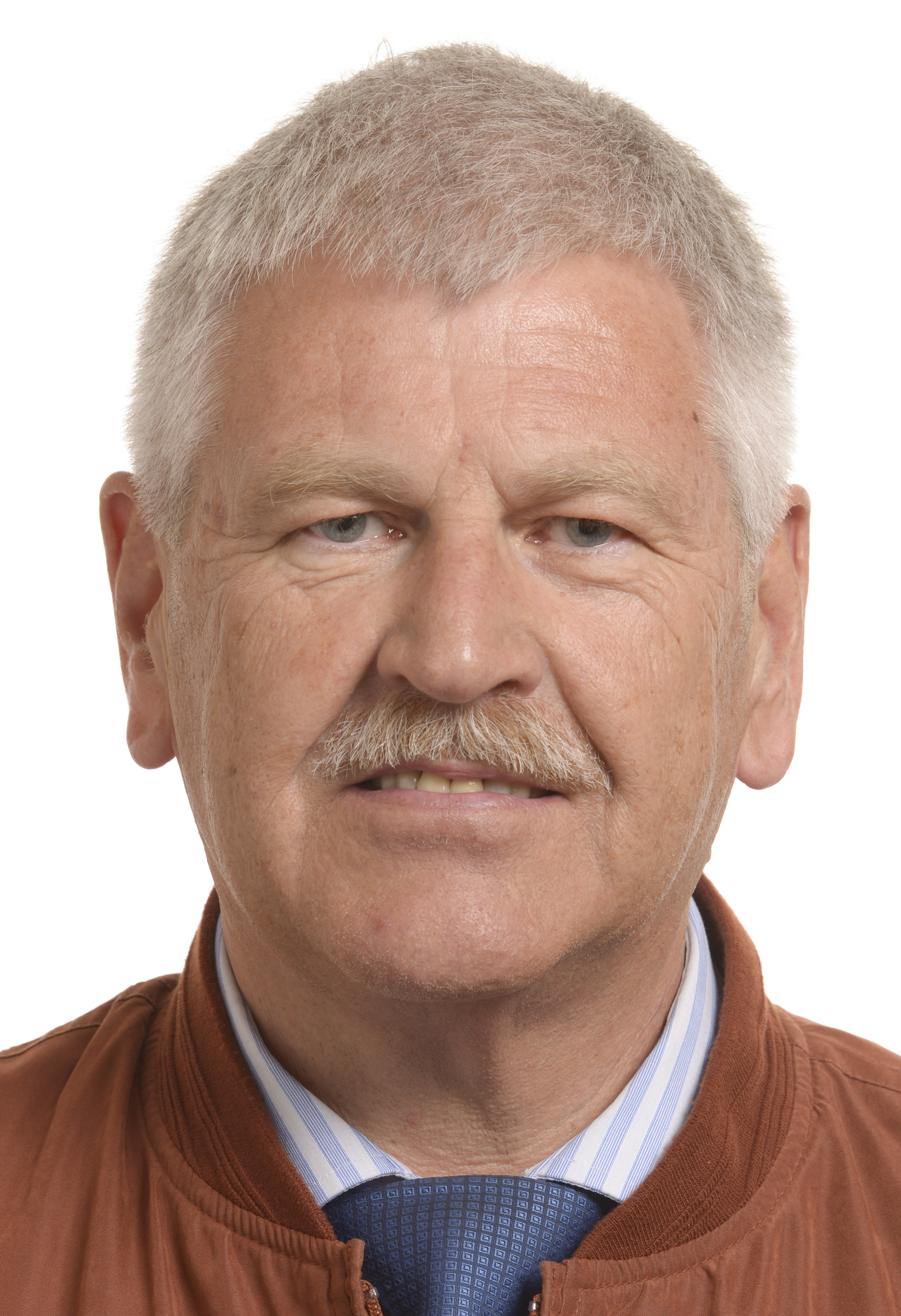
- Voigt in 2014

Leader of the National Democratic Party of Germany
- In office 23 March 1996 – 23 November 2011
- Preceded by: Günter Deckert
- Succeeded by: Holger Apfel

Member of the European Parliament for Germany
- In office 1 July 2014 – 2 July 2019
- Preceded by: multi-member district
- Succeeded by: multi-member district

Member of the Treptow-Köpenick Borough Council
- In office 26 October 2006 – 27 October 2016
- Preceded by: multi-member district
- Succeeded by: multi-member district

Personal details
- Born: 14 April 1952 Viersen, North Rhine-Westphalia, West Germany
- Died: 17 July 2025 (aged 73)
- Party: NPD (1968–2025)
- Education: FH Aachen; Munich School of Political Science; LMU Munich (Master's)
- Occupation: Politician; businessman

Military service
- Allegiance: West Germany
- Branch: German Air Force
- Service years: 1972–1984
- Rank: Captain

Udo Manfred Lothar Voigt (German: [ˈuːdoː ˈfoːkt]; 14 April 1952 – 17 July 2025) was a German politician and Member of the European Parliament (MEP) for the Neo-Nazi party National Democratic Party of Germany (NPD) from 2014 to 2019. The NPD has since changed its name to Die Heimat (The Homeland). He was a member of the European Parliament Committee on Civil Liberties, Justice and Home Affairs. He served as leader of NPD from 1996 to 2011. By profession, he was a captain in the German Air Force and had a master's degree in political science from LMU Munich.

== Early life and career ==
The son of a former Wehrmacht officer, Voigt was born in Viersen, North Rhine-Westphalia, West Germany. After graduating from Gymnasium, he became an airframe mechanic apprentice. In 1971, he studied aerospace engineering at the Aachen University of Applied Sciences for two terms, but did not graduate. In 1972, he was conscripted by the Bundeswehr. Later, he worked in the German Air Force from 1972 to 1984 and graduated as an officer from the Luftwaffe Officer's School. He served in Germany and at a NATO facility in Greece. Between 1982 and 1987, he studied political science at the Munich School of Political Science and graduated with a master's degree in political science from LMU Munich.

== Political career ==
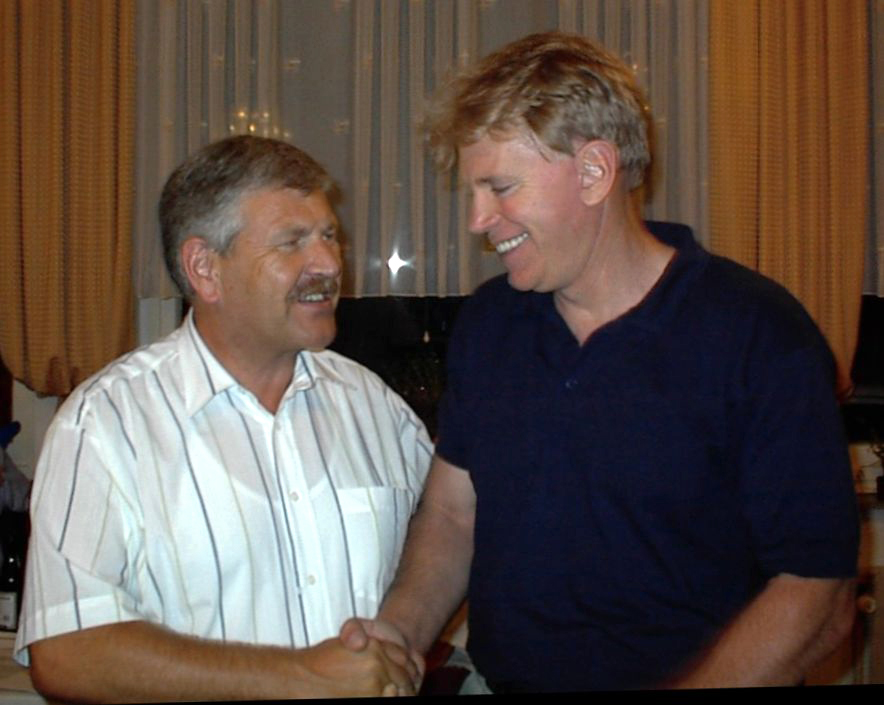
Udo Voigt and prominent American white nationalist David Duke

Voigt joined the NPD at age 16 in 1968.

He was elected as party chairman in 1996, succeeding Günter Deckert. From September 2006 till 2010, Voigt was an elected member of the Berlin municipal government in the Treptow-Köpenick district. He has been previously unsuccessful in the European Parliament elections and when running for mayor of Saarbrücken.

On 13 March 2008, Voigt was charged (for at least the second time) with incitement ("Volksverhetzung") for distributing racially charged pamphlets. In 2009, he was given a seven-month suspended sentence and ordered to donate €2,000 to UNICEF. Voigt protested against the charge, claiming it was politically motivated.

On 13 November 2011, Voigt was replaced as leader of the NPD by Holger Apfel.

Voigt was elected as a member of the European Parliament in the 2014 European Elections.

In later years, Voigt became a strong supporter of Vladimir Putin and said that Germany should have "a chancellor like Putin."

== Death ==
Voigt died after a "serious but short illness" on 17 July 2025, at the age of 73.
