= Stefan Eck =

German politician

Stefan Bernhard Eck
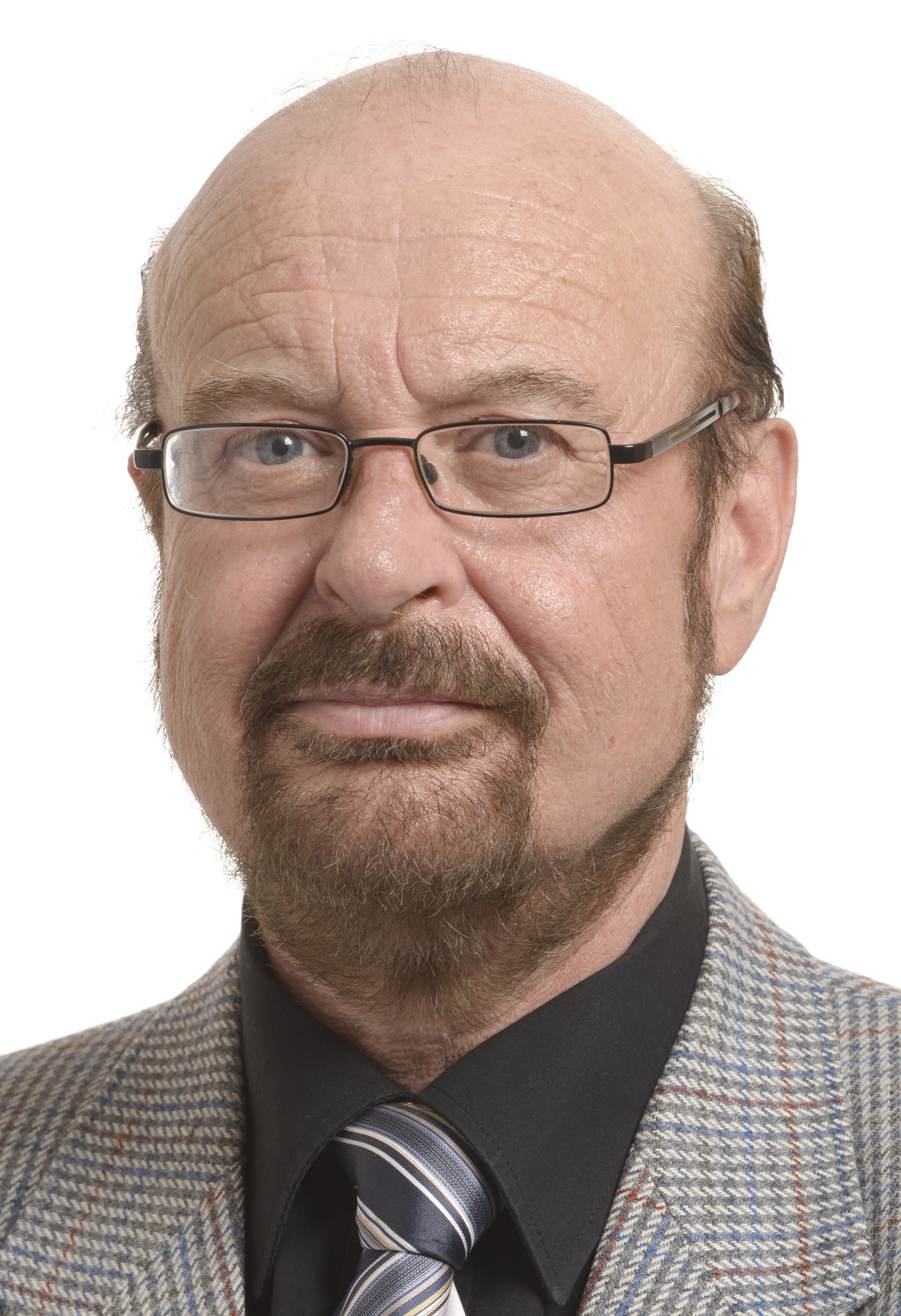

Member of the European Parliament
- In office 1 July 2014 – 2019
- Constituency: Germany

Personal details
- Born: 8 January 1956 (age 70) Hamburg, West Germany
- Party: Ecological Democratic Party
- Other political affiliations: Human Environment Animal Protection Party (-2014)
- Occupation: Politician
- Profession: Businessman, advertising agent, artist, politician
- Committees: European Parliament Committee on Agriculture and Rural Development, Committee on the Environment, Public Health and Food Safety, Committee on Women's Rights and Gender Equality
- Awards: EU4Animals Award

Stefan Bernhard Eck is a German politician, who, since 2014, represented Germany in the European Parliament until 2019. He was elected representing the Human Environment Animal Protection Party, but left the party in December 2014. He sat as an Independent in the European United Left–Nordic Green Left group. Since January 2020 he has been a member of the Ecological Democratic Party.

== Work at the European Parliament ==
In the European Parliament, he was vice president of the Intergroup on Animal Welfare and Conservation and a full member of the Committee on the Environment, Public Health and Food Safety. He was also a substitute member of the Committee on Agriculture and Rural Development and the Committee on Women's Rights and Gender Equality and Delegations for relations with the People's Republic of China, the countries of South Asia, the countries of Southeast Asia and the Association of Southeast Asian States and for relations with the Korean Peninsula. He is also a founding member of the Interparliamentary Interest Group "MEPs for Wildlife".

His main activities include animal and human rights as well as environmental protection.
