= Martin Mussgnug =

German politician (1936–1997)

Martin Mussgnug (22 February 1936 – 2 February 1997) was a German politician and leader of the National Democratic Party of Germany (NPD) from 1971 to 1991.

== Life ==
Mussgnug was born in Heidelberg. He first came to prominence in 1956 when he set up the Bund Nationaler Studenten, a far-right student organisation that was banned in 1963. Whilst leading this group he became involved with the Deutsche Reichspartei, becoming deputy chair of their Heidelberg group and following the party into the NPD in 1964. By 1968 he had been appointed chair of the NPD in Baden-Württemberg and was elected to the state Landtag that same year. He held the seat until 1972 when the party was eliminated from the Landtag. He replaced Adolf von Thadden as party leader in 1971 although the battle for the leadership proved somewhat divisive as his defeated opponent, Siegfried Pöhlmann, split away from the NPD with his supporters the following year in order to establish his own group, Aktion Neue Rechte.

Mussgnug followed a largely similar course in party policy terms, in the process becoming the party's longest serving leader to date. Nonetheless, he and von Thadden did not enjoy a good relationship, due to Mussgnug's closeness to his rival Gerhard Frey. Von Thadden left the party in 1975 over the issue and Mussgnug secured for Frey a seat on the NPD's executive committee. Ultimately Mussgnug resigned on 16 December 1990 following poor results for the party in the 1990 federal election. Succeeded by Deckert, he left the NPD after this and became involved in setting up the German League for People and Homeland (DLVH). He disappeared from politics when this group proved unsuccessful.

He died on 2 February 1997 in Tuttlingen.
