= Reinhard Kekulé von Stradonitz =

German classical archeologist

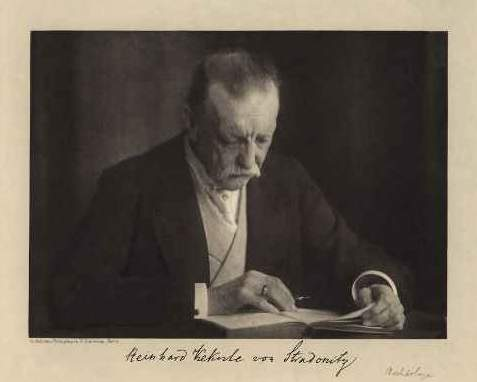
Reinhard Kekulé von Stradonitz.

Reinhard Kekulé von Stradonitz (name at birth Kekulé, called Kekulé von Stradonitz only after 1889; 6 March 1839 – 23 March 1911) was a German archeologist. He has been called the founder of modern iconology (Langlotz). He served as director of the collection of antique sculpture and vases at the Berlin Museum (from 1889) and also as the director of the antiquarium of the Berlin Museum (from 1896). Kekulé was the nephew of the organic chemist August Kekulé.

== Biography ==
Born at Darmstadt, Kekulé studied at the universities of Erlangen under Karl Friederichs, and at Berlin under Eduard Gerhard, Johann Gustav Droysen, and August Böckh. His time in Rome with Enrico Brunn was quite influential for his later writing. In 1870 he succeeded Otto Jahn, who had died prematurely, at the University of Bonn.

In 1889 Kaiser Wilhelm II of Germany personally requested Kekulé to be the antiquities director of the collections in Berlin. In the following year, he succeeded Carl Robert at the university in Berlin which he held jointly with the directorship. It was then that the emperor allowed the "von Stradonitz" designation. Kekulé greatly increased the size of the imperial collections through a combination of astute buying and commissioning excavations, assisted in the latter by Theodor Wiegand. Kekulé was a prominent lecturer, though his writings are tinged with what today appear as superficial comments. His students included Hermann Ulmann and Ulrich von Wilamowitz-Moellendorff.

He eschewed Jahn's "monumental philology" and classification for a methodology closer to Brunn, mixed with an esthetic sensitivity akin to J. J. Winckelmann. His connoisseurship, more than Winckelmann's, was rooted in scholarship.

== Bibliography ==
- Über die Entstehung der Götterideale der grieschischen Kunst. Stuttgart: Verlag von W. Spemann,1877.
- Die Gruppe des Künstlers Menelaos in Villa Ludovisi: Ein Beitrag zur Geschichte der griechischen Kunst. Leipzig: W. Engelmann, 1870.
- Bronzestatuette eines kämpfenden Galliers in den Königlichen Museen. Berlin: G. Reimer, 1909.
- Echelos und Basile, attisches Relief aus Rhodos in den Königlichen Museen. Berlin, G. Reimer, 1905.
- Die griechische Skulptur. Berlin: G. Reimer, 1906.
- Über copien einer frauenstatue aus der zeit des Phidias. Berlin: G. Reimer, 1897.
- Über ein Bildnis der Perikles in den königlichen Museen. Berlin: G. Reimer, 1901.
