= Paul Wolters =

German classical archaeologist

- Born: Paul Heinrich August Wolters; September 1, 1858; Bonn, Kingdom of Prussia
- Died: October 21, 1936 (aged 78); Munich, Germany
- Occupation: Classical archaeologist

Paul Heinrich August Wolters (1 September 1858 in Bonn – 21 October 1936 in Munich) was a German classical archaeologist who specialized in ancient Greek and Roman art. He was the son of theologian Albrecht Wolters (1822–1878).

He studied classical philology and archaeology at the University of Halle, the University of Strasbourg, and the University of Bonn, obtaining his PhD in 1882. By way of a scholarship from the German Archaeological Institute (DAI), he took a study trip to Italy, Greece and Asia Minor from 1885 until 1887. From 1900 to 1908, he was a professor at the University of Würzburg, and in 1908, succeeded Adolf Furtwangler as professor of classical archaeology at the Ludwig-Maximilians-Universität München. Here, he was also director of the Glyptothek Museum. Among his better known students was archaeologist Ernst Buschor.

From 1888 to 1889, he performed excavatory work at the Kabeirion of Thebes, a rural sanctuary containing temples and theaters. In 1925, with Gabriel Welter, he conducted an archaeological excavation at Aegina Kolonna.

== Published works ==
In 1885, he published a new edition of Karl Friederichs' Die Gipsabgüsse antiker Bildwerke in historischer Folge erklärt : Bausteine zur Geschichte der griechisch-römischen plastik (The plaster casts of ancient sculptures explained in historical sequence, etc.) Other noted works by Wolters include:

- Mykenische gräber in Kephallenia, Athens, 1894 – Mycenaean tombs in Cephalonia.
- Der westgiebel des olympischen Zeustempels, Munich, Royal Bavarian Academy of Sciences, 1908 – The west gable of the Olympian Zeus.
- Beschreibung der Glyptothek König Ludwig’s I. zu München. Munich, 1910.
- Eine Darstellung des athenischen Staatsfriedhofs, 1913 – A representation of the Athenian state cemetery.
- Archäologische Bemerkungen, 1915 – Archaeological comments.
- Der Geflügelte Seher, 1928 – The winged seer.
- Das Kabirenheiligtum bei Theben, 1940 (with Gerda Bruns) – the Kabeirion sanctuary near Thebes.
