= Stuckenberg =

Stuckenberg is a surname. Notable people with the surname include:

- Brian Roy Stuckenberg (1930–2009), South African entomologist
- Fritz Stuckenberg (1881–1944), German painter
- Viggo Stuckenberg (1863–1905), Danish poet
