= Franz Kluxen =

German modern art collector

Franz Werner Kluxen (17 March 1888, Münster – 1968, Münster) was an important German art collector of modern art and a merchant before the First World War.

== Life and work ==
Franz Werner Kluxen was the son of wealthy merchants. He attended the grammar school in Attendorn, where he met Carl Schmitt, with whom he remained in contact throughout his life. He began collecting modern art as a young man, purchasing from dealers such as Alfred Flechtheim, Wilhelm Uhde and Daniel-Henry Kahnweiler, as well as directly from the artists. He owned at least 13 important works by Pablo Picasso, according to Picasso biographer John Richardson. Only Leo Stein's Picasso collection in Paris was as remarkable.

Kluxen's collection included German Expressionism to French and Czech Cubism and Italian Futurism. He was a major collector of Marc Chagall and he acquired paintings by Alexej von Jawlensky, August Macke, Franz Marc, Paul Cézanne, Georges Braque, Wassily Kandinsky, Ernst Ludwig Kirchner, Oskar Kokoschka, Edvard Munch, Vincenc Beneš, Carlo Carrà, André Derain, Emil Filla, Albert Gleizes, Wilhelm Gimmi, Erich Heckel, Hermann Huber, Ernst Ludwig Kirchner, Fernand Léger, Jean Metzinger and Max Pechstein. Major works by various artists, Marc's Foxes and The Yellow Cow, Carrà's Funeral of the Anarchist Galli (Museum of Modern Art), Jawlensky's Turandot, Chagall's Paris through the Window (Solomon R. Guggenheim Museum) and Kandinsky's Improvisation No. 10 were in his possession.

"Kluxen was the first German to buy a Picasso, really the first," wrote Carl Schmitt in his memoirs about the childhood friend "who always had a lot of money". "I can confirm that the purchases I know you made - especially of Cézanne, Picasso and Munch - were a hell of a rush, that you bought them just before the great upward movement. Your Cézanne is worth a fortune today, your Picasso twice that," Alfred Flechtheim wrote to him in 1912.

Kluxen lent part of his collection to the epoch-making Sonderbund exhibition in Cologne in 1912. A close companion at that time was Herwarth Walden, one of the most important gallery owners of the 20th century. He owned the Berlin gallery "Der Sturm", where 60 paintings, watercolours and drawings from the "Kluxen Collection" were shown at the 54th exhibition (in August 1917).

"One of the best modern collections in Germany", said the art critic Theodor Däubler in the Berliner Börsen-Courier. But building up the collection swallowed up vast sums of money. In 1917, the poet Sophie van Leer wrote to the gallery owner Georg Muche: "I really don't know what will become of the collection if Kluxen continues to manage it so pecuniarily." On 8 October 1919, Georg Alexander Mathéy, a successful graphic artist, wrote to Muche: "Most of the Kluxen collection has now become my property by purchase (except for the Chagalls)." In 1927 another wave of sales followed, as evidenced by a letter from Muche to Kluxen: "I can now easily endeavour to sell your pictures. (...) Please let me know which of your pictures you want to sell."

During the First World War, Kluxen studied at the Ludwig-Maximilians-Universität München and married for the first time. Around 1920, Kluxen learned of the existence of Joseph Anton Schneiderfranken, the Lehrwerk and the Jakob Böhme Bund through the painter Fritz Stuckenberg, as did other artists of the Sturm movement such as Herwarth Walden and Sophie van Leer later on, and came into contact with the artists' group. Although Franz Kluxen kept in touch with artists like Muche, he largely withdrew from the art scene at the end of the 1920s. In 1922, Kluxen entered his father's business. In 1931, he married for the second time and moved temporarily to Potsdam. The couple had two children. In 1932, Kluxen founded a Masonic lodge in his house in Potsdam, which, among other things, explicitly opposed racial hatred.

== Nazi era ==
The Masonic lodge was banned by the Nazis until 1935. Kluxen was apparently arrested and interrogated several times by the Gestapo. Chagall's The Deceased (Der Tod) (1911; whereabouts unknown) was confiscated from the Staatliche Gemäldegalerie in Dresden as Degenerate Art during the Nazi era.

During the Second World War, Kluxen was not conscripted for military service and moved several times within Germany. With his third wife, he led a middle-class life after the war as manager of the Kluxen department stores'.

== Literature ==
- Der Sturm, Sammlung Kluxen. Vierundfünfzigste Ausstellung. Gemälde und Aquarelle, Zeichnungen, Galerie Der Sturm, Berlin, 1917, Herwarth Walden
- 1912 Mission Moderne: Die Jahrhundertschau des Sonderbundes, Wienand, 2012, Barbara Schäfer
