= Domsheide =

Major square in Bremen, Germany

Coordinates: 53°4′30″N 8°48′32″E

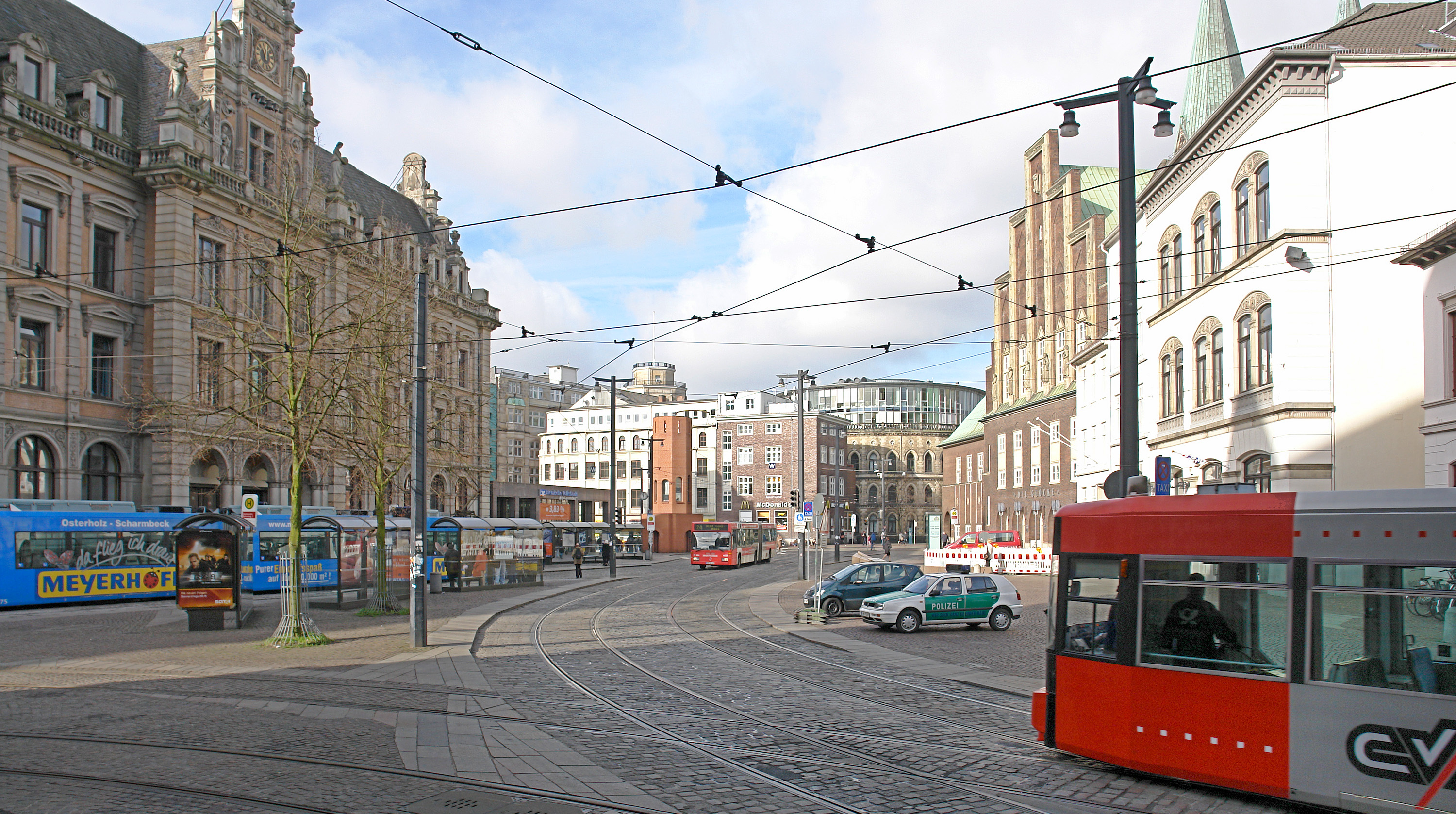
Domsheide

Domsheide is a major square in the city of Bremen, Germany. It is located east of the Marktplatz and south of Bremen Cathedral. Streets leading to it include Ostertorstraße, Dechanatstraße, Balgebrückstraße and Violenstraße. It contains a number of important buildings, including the main post office, the courthouse, the cathedral precinct with the bell, and the annex to the stock market building. It is one of three main hubs of the public transport network, with most tram routes and two important bus lines crossing the square. The design of the Domsheide is relatively uneven, characterized by materials such as sandstone, dark red brick, red and yellow clinkers, render, concrete and marble.

== History ==
In the Middle Ages, the open area south of the cathedral was known as Wulverickesheide (Wulverick Heath), probably from the name of the owner, Wulverick. Later, it was simply known as Heide and from the 16th century as Domsheide (Cathedral Heath), no doubt because the archbishop held court there under a lime tree. The Domsheide belonged to the Dombezirk (Cathedral District), an enclave which until 1803 was under the sovereign and legal control of the Bishop of Bremen, not the Free City of Bremen. The small Cathedral District was originally surrounded by a wall which was torn down in the 11th century.

Die Glocke (The Bell), an octagonal bell-shaped building belonging to the cathedral chapter, stood south of the cathedral in the Middle Ages. It was the venue for the meetings of the chapter and, from 1648, for the deliberations of the court. In 1737, a new octagonal building was constructed on the site, coming under the authority of the City of Bremen in 1803. Since 1857, it has belonged to the Künstlerverein (Artists Association). In 1642, the Kapitelhaus (Chapter House) to the south of the cathedral became the Lutheran Grammar School or the Domschule und Athenaeum Bremen.

== 18th to 20th century ==
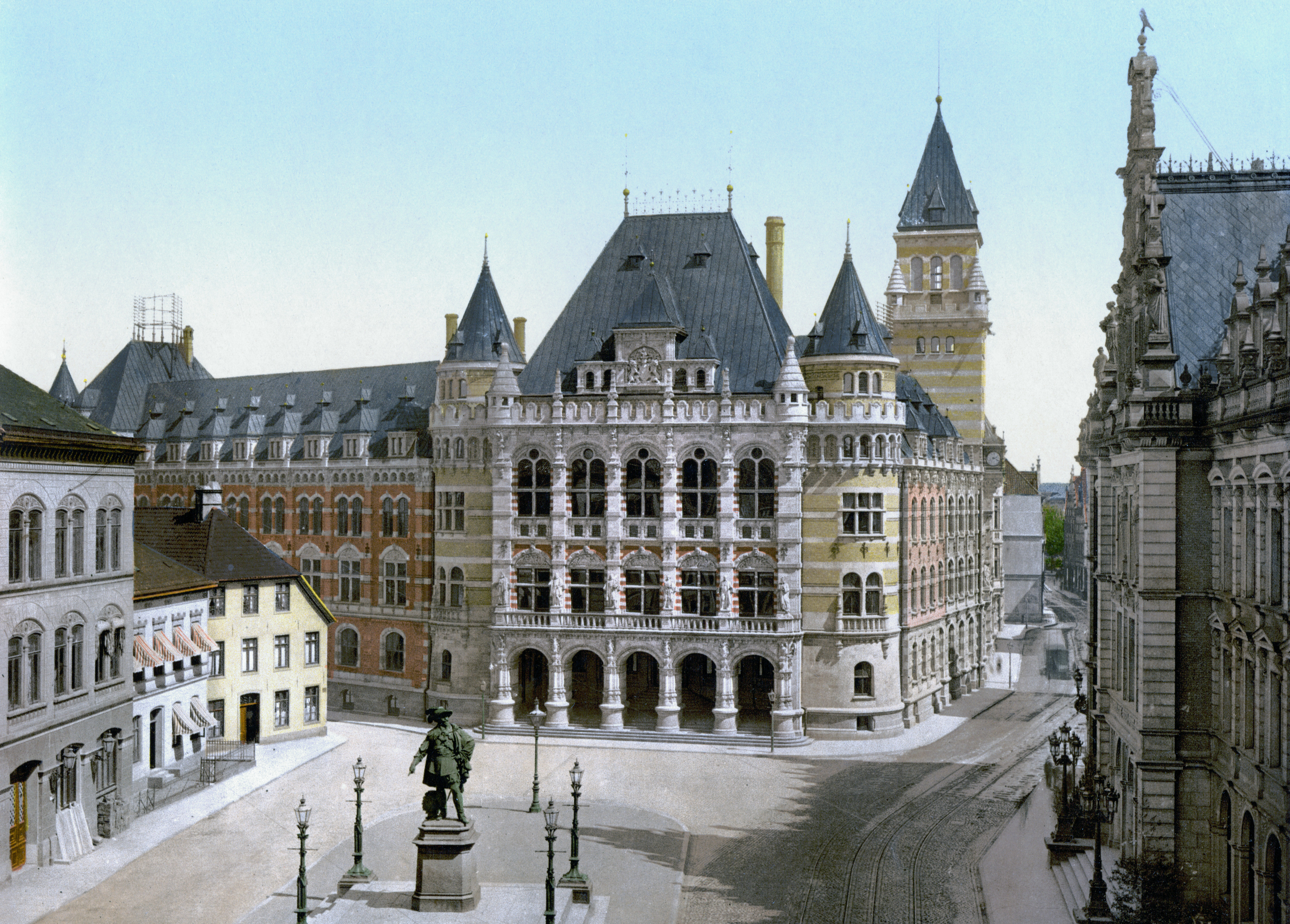
View of the square in 1900

In 1733, the area was levelled, fenced in and planted. It was only at the beginning of the 19th century that buildings began to be constructed around the square. In 1856, a monument to Gustav Adolph was erected in the centre of the square but was destroyed for scrap in 1942. The bronze statue was actually intended to be installed in Gothenburg but came back to Bremen after a shipwreck. A second cast was then made for the Swedes. Until 1872, the Debbersche Knaben-Vorschule (a boys primary school) stood on the site where the post office was constructed in 1875. Initially known as the Kaiserliche Oberpostdirektion, the Bremen Main Post Office Building was designed by the Berlin architect Carl Schwatlo (1831–1884).

In 1895, designed by Ludwig Klingenberg (1840–1924) in the French Renaissance style, the Bremen Court House (Landgericht Bremen) was completed. It suffered only slight war damage in 1944.

After a fire in 1915, the old Glocke building was demolished, making way for a new concert hall building with the same name designed by Walter Görig (1885–1974) and completed in 1928. Its elegant art deco design and excellent acoustics have been praised by a number of artists including Herbert von Karajan, Anne-Sophie Mutter and Gidon Kremer.

== Listed buildings ==
A number of listed buildings are located on the Domsheide:

- Börsenhof A, located at Number 5a, Am Dom, the semicircular building with a glazed upper floor was an annex to the New Stock Exchange designed by Heinrich Müller and completed in 1864.
- Pfarrhaus der St. Petri-Domgemeinde (Rectory of St Peter's Cathedral). Located at Number 2, Domsheide, a Neoclassical building designed by Johann Hinrich Schröder in 1845
- Haus Kulenkampff & Johannisloge "Zum Ölzweig", located at Number 3, Domsheide, a residential building in the Neo-Renaissance style, designed by Johann Hinrich Schröder in 1848
- Die Glocke, located at Numbers 6, 7 & 8, Domsheide, concert hall
- Kaiserliche Oberpostdirektion (Post Office), located at Number 15, Domsheide
- Gerichtsgebäude und Untersuchungsgefängnis (Court House), located at Number 16, Domsheide

== Gallery ==
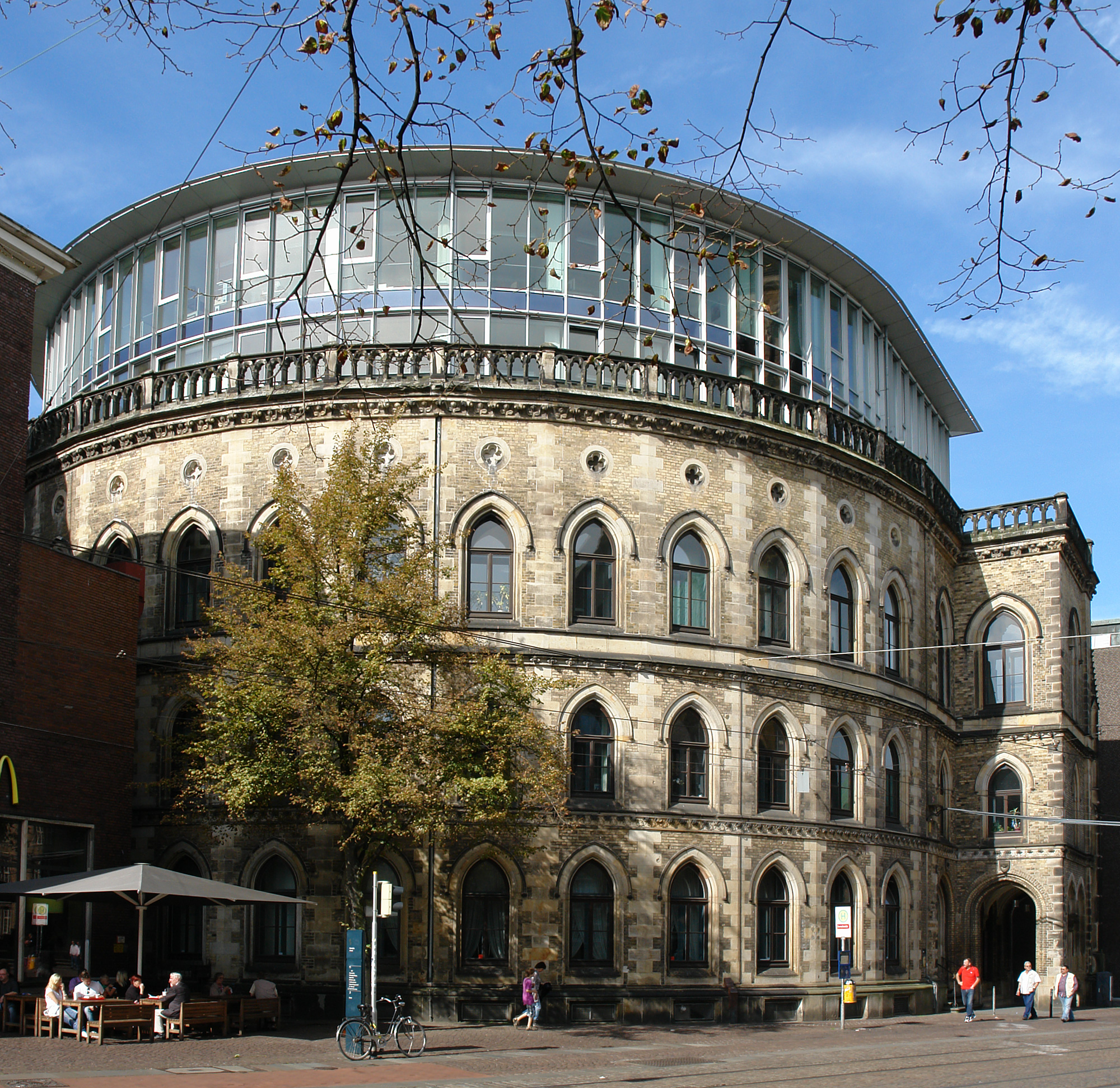
Börsenhof A

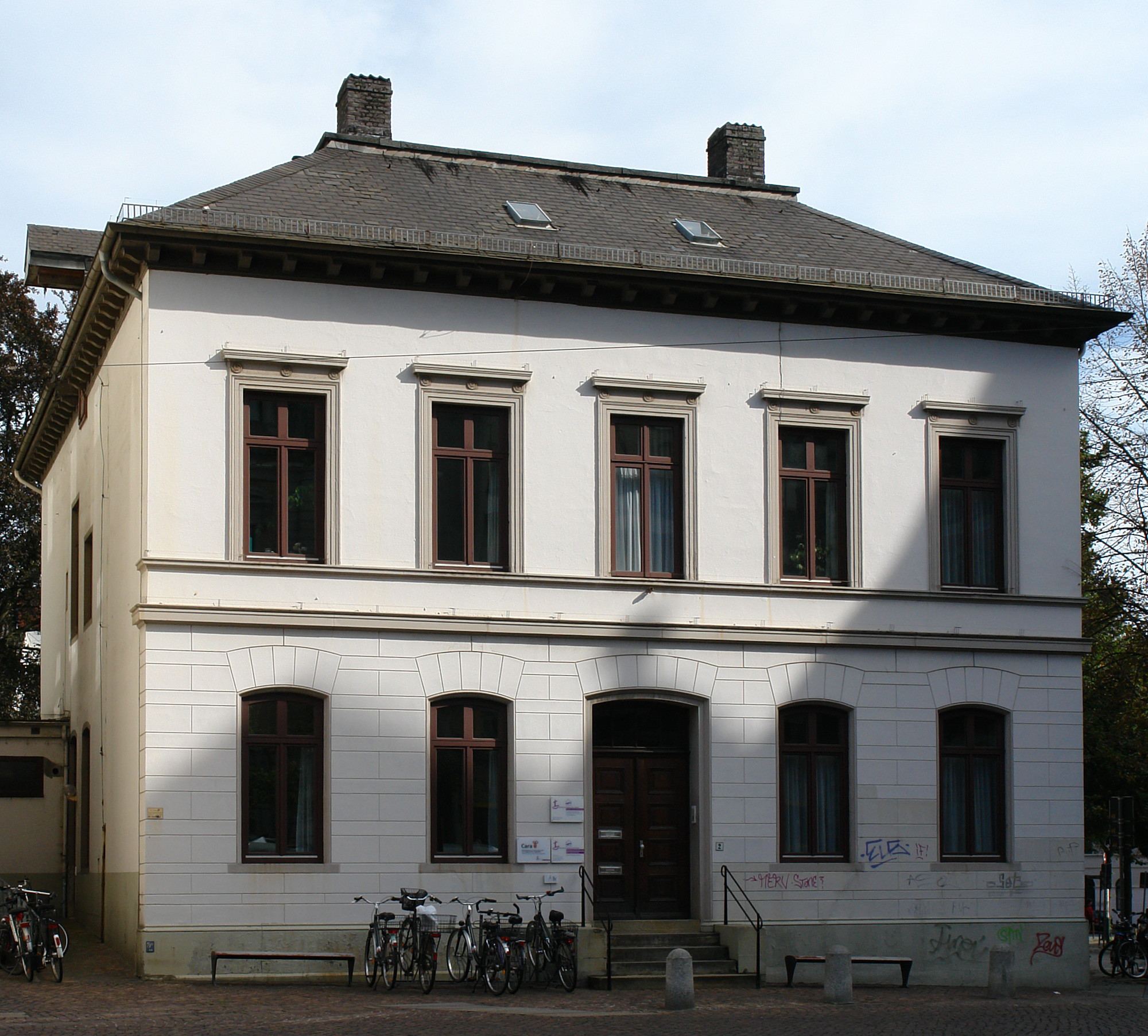
Pfarrhaus

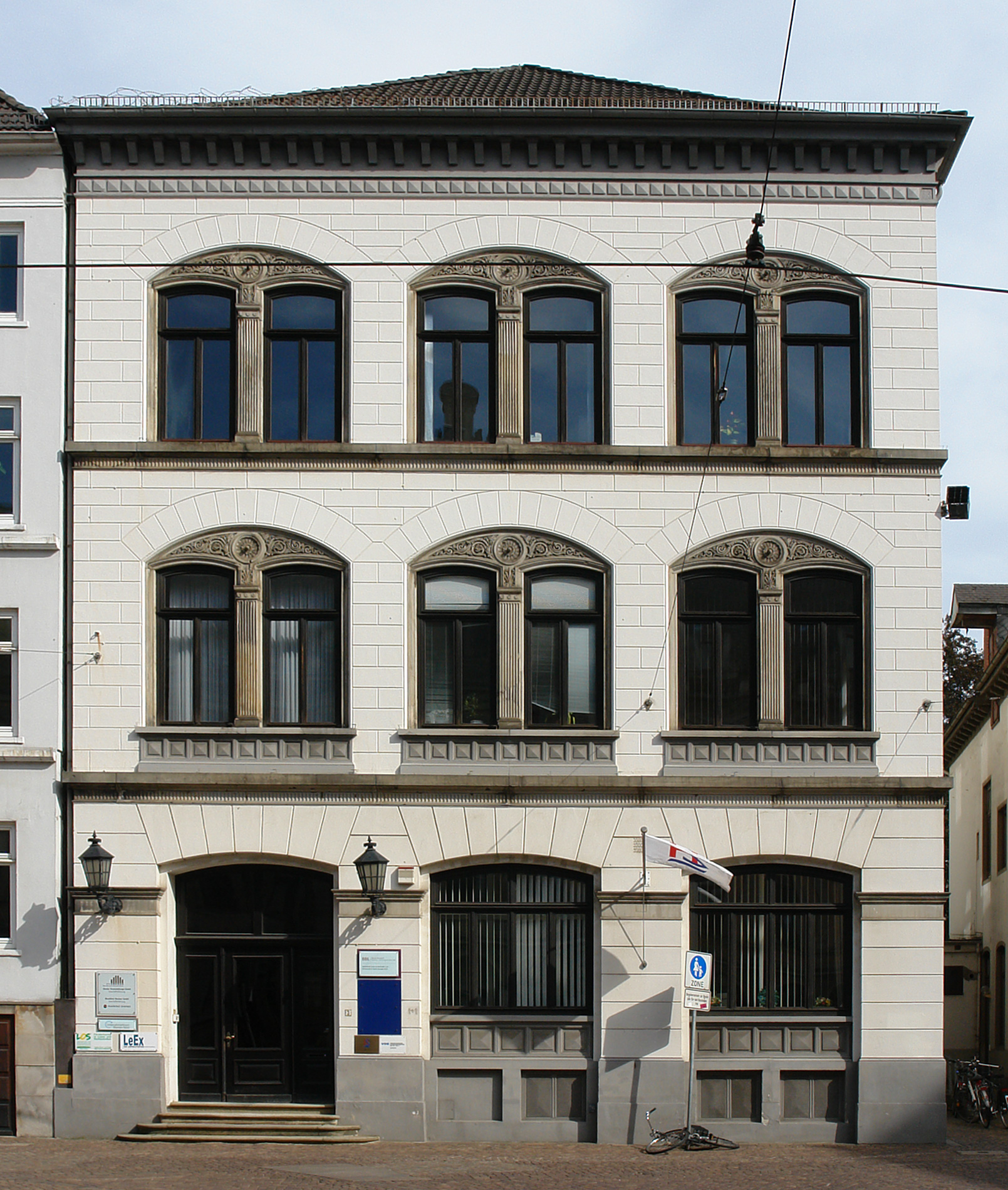
Haus Kulenkampff

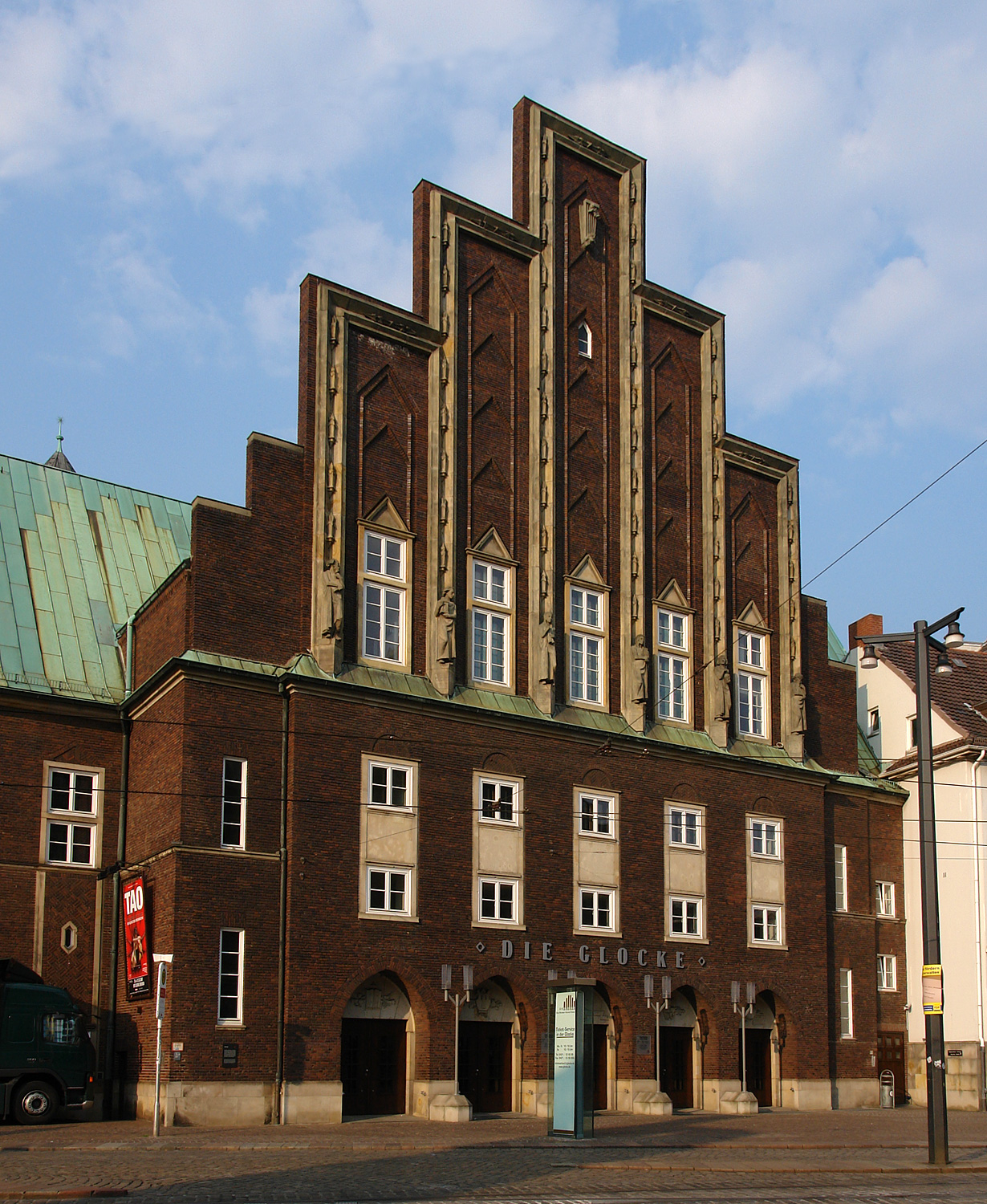
Die Glocke

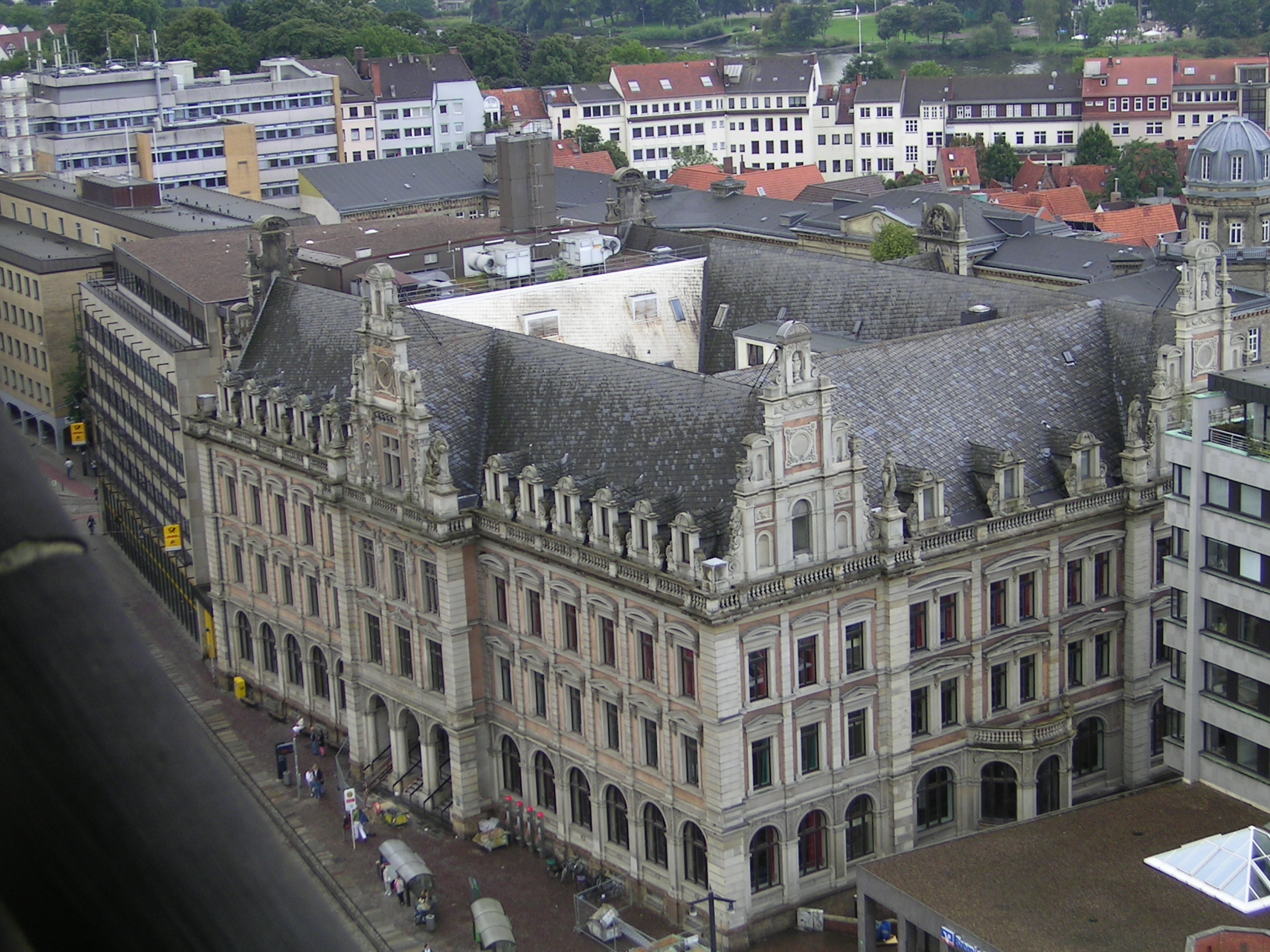
Post Office

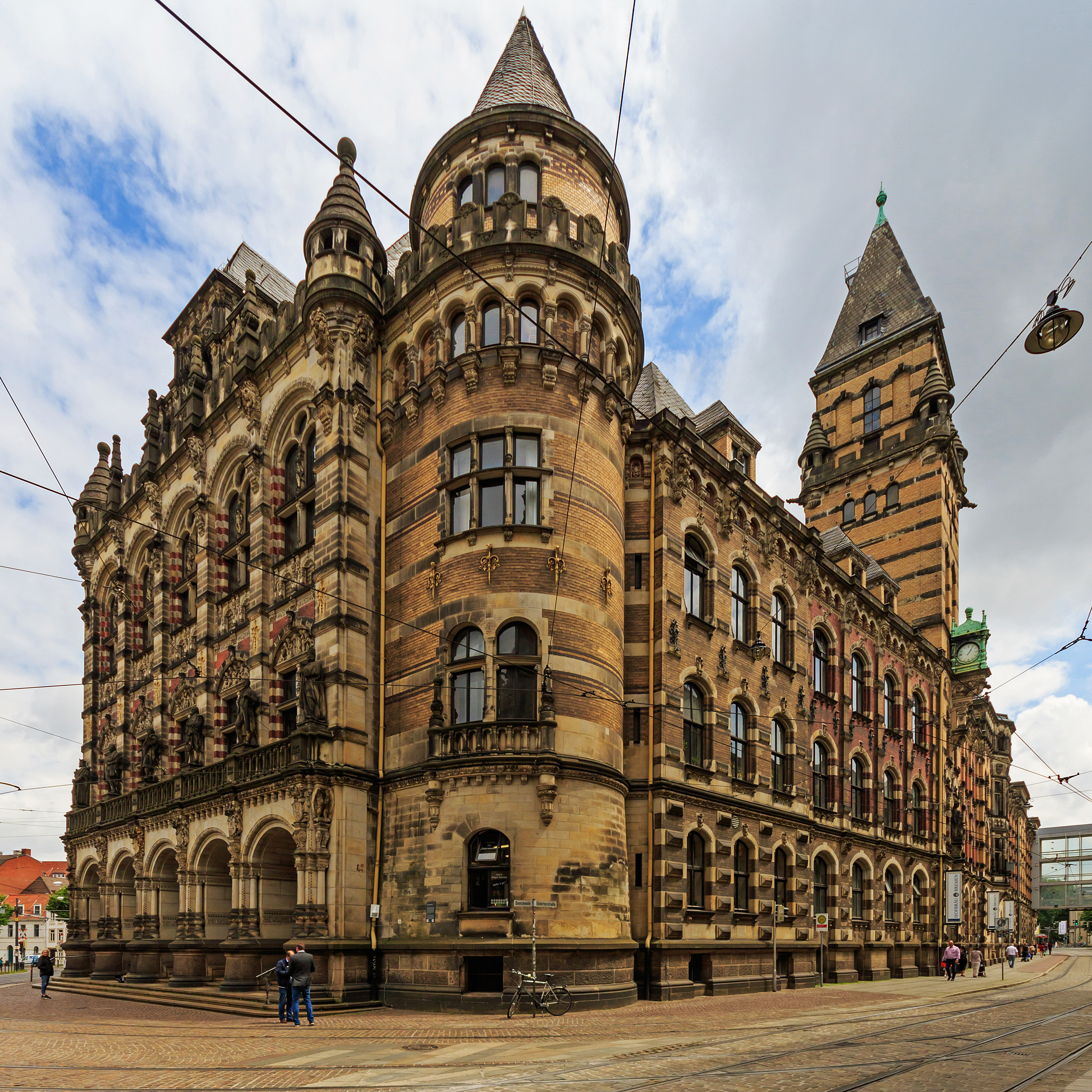
Court House
