= Albrecht Wolters =

German Protestant theologian

Albrecht Julius Constantin Wolters (25 August 1822, Emmerich am Rhein – 29 March 1878, Halle an der Saale) was a German Protestant theologian. He was the father of classical archaeologist Paul Wolters (1858–1936).

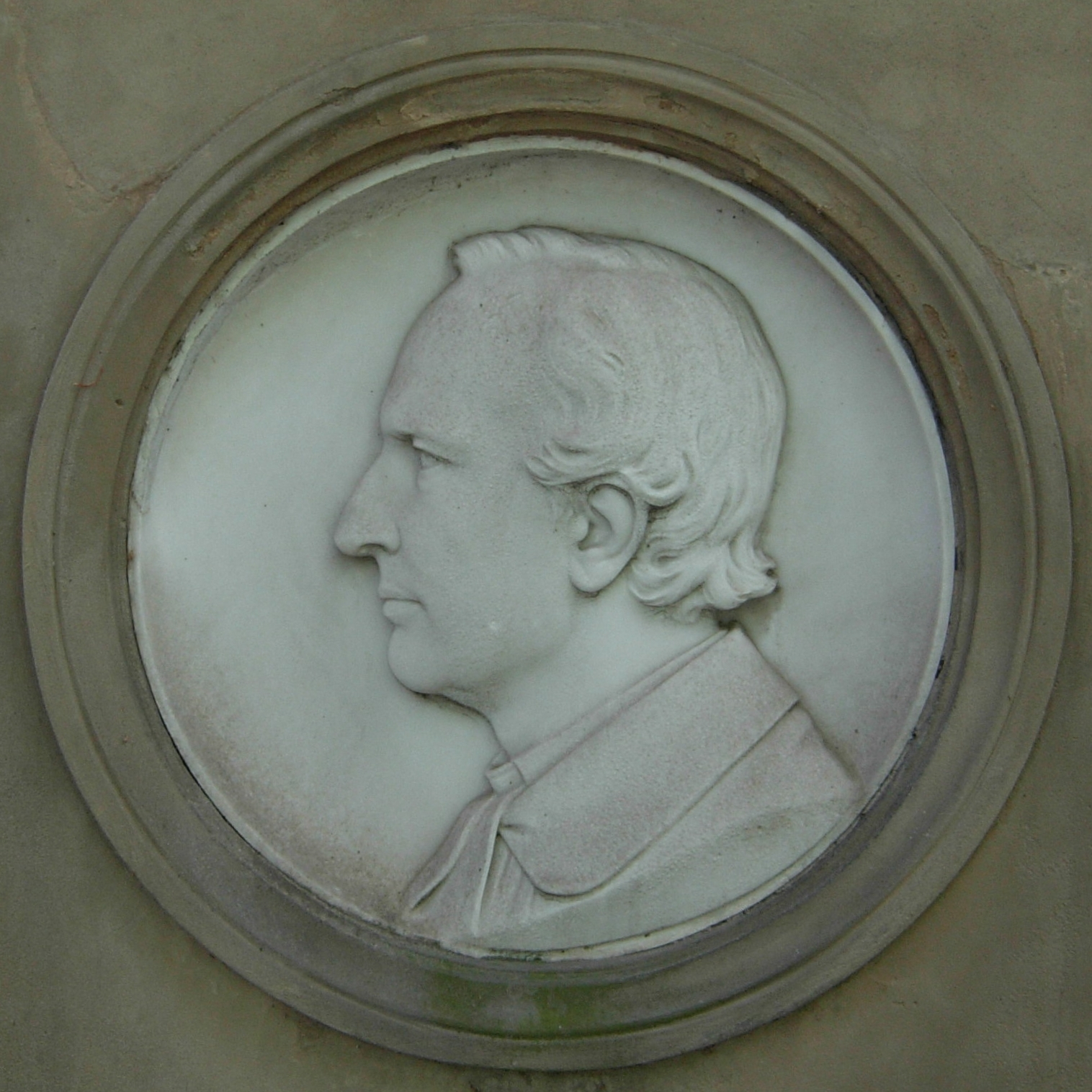
Marble medaillon of Albrecht Wolters

He studied theology at the Universities of Bonn and Berlin, where he was a pupil of August Neander. After passing his first theological examination, he spent three years as a tutor in Naples, then serving as an assistant pastor in the city of Krefeld (1849). In 1850 became a teacher at a higher Töchterschule in Cologne, and from July 1851 to May 1857, worked as a pastor in Wesel.

From 1857, he became a pastor and superintendent in Bonn, and in 1868, received his doctorate of divinity from the University of Bonn. In 1874 he was appointed professor of practical theology at the University of Halle. In 1876, with Willibald Beyschlag he founded the Deutsch-evangelischen Blätter, a publication of the Mittelpartei (central party) in the Kirche der Altpreußischen Union.

== Principal works ==
- Die Prinzipien der rheinisch-westfälischen Kirchenordnung, 1862, – The principles of the Rhenish-Westphalian church order.
- Der Heidelberger Katechismus in seiner ursprünglichen Gestalt, 1864 – The Heidelberg Catechism in its original form.
- Reformationsgeschichte der Stadt Wesel bis zur Befestigung ihres reformierten Bekenntnisses, 1867 – Reformation history of the city of Wesel in securing their Reformed confessions.
- Konrad von Heresbach und der Clevische Hof, 1867 – Konrad Heresbach and the Cleves court.
- Luther und der Kardinal Albrecht von Mainz, 1889 – Martin Luther and Cardinal Albrecht of Mainz.
