= Delmenhorst =

Urban district in Lower Saxony, Germany

- Town
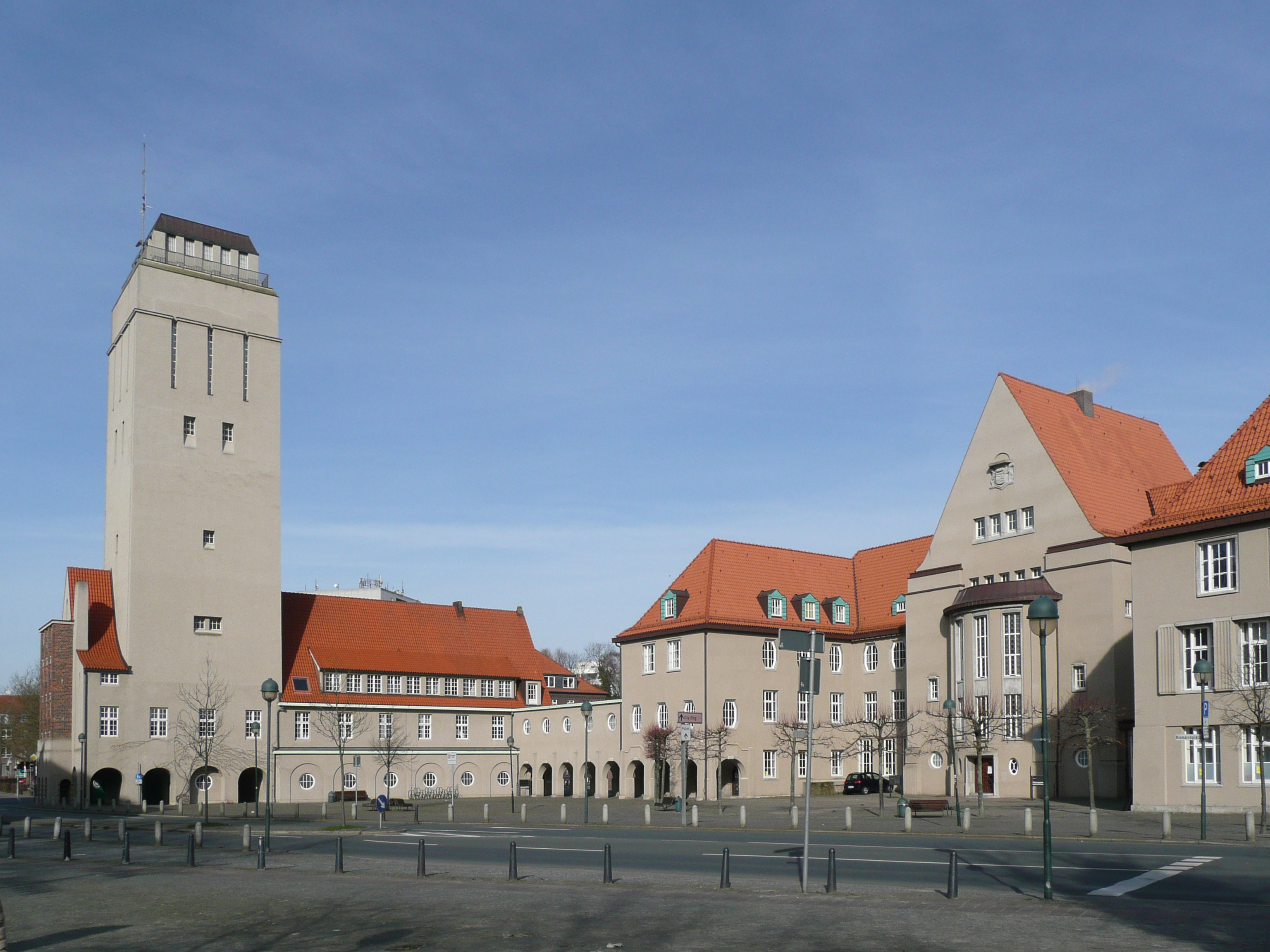

- Flag Coat of arms
- Interactive map of Delmenhorst
- Location within Germany Location within Lower Saxony
- Coordinates: 53°03′02″N 08°37′54″E
- Country: Germany
- State: Lower Saxony
- District: Urban district

Government
  - Mayor (2026–31): Alexander Mittag (SPD)

Area
  - Total: 62.36 km^{2} (24.08 sq mi)
- Elevation: 7 m (23 ft)

Population (2025-12-31)
  - Total: 81,274
  - Density: 1,303/km^{2} (3,376/sq mi)
- Time zone: UTC+01:00 (CET)
  - Summer (DST): UTC+02:00 (CEST)
- Postal codes: 27747, 27749, 27751, 27753,27755
- Dialling codes: 04221
- Vehicle registration: DEL
- Website: www.delmenhorst.de

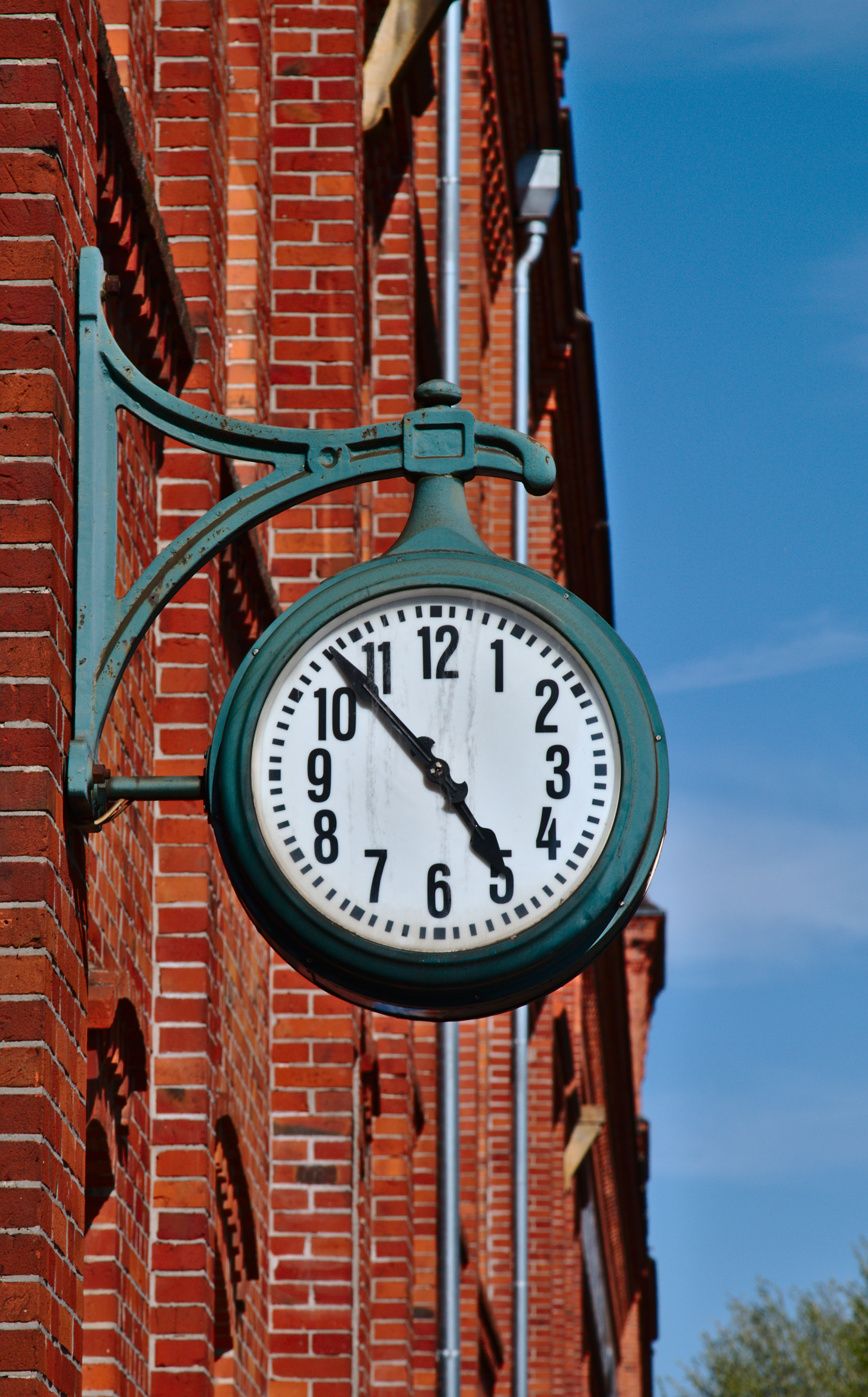
Clock at Nordwolle building

Delmenhorst (German pronunciation: [ˈdɛlmənˌhɔʁst]; Northern Low Saxon: Demost) is an urban district (Kreisfreie Stadt) in Lower Saxony, Germany. It has a population of 74,500 and is located 10 kilometres (6 miles) west of downtown Bremen with which it forms a contiguous urban area, whereas the city of Oldenburg is 25 kilometres (16 miles) to the northwest. The city has a total area of 62.36 square kilometres (24.08 square miles); and a population density of approx. 1200 inhabitants per km².

Since 2021, the mayor has been Petra Gerlach (CDU).

== History ==
Delmenhorst was first mentioned in a charter in 1254, after the Count of Oldenburg, Otto I, bought the place near the river Delme in 1234. A castle to protect the newly founded settlement was established in about 1247. The following count, Otto II, made the castle his residency; Delmenhorst was declared an independent town on 15 July 1371 under Bremen's law.

After a short period under the governance of the bishop of Bremen from 1421 to 1436 Delmenhorst returned under the custody of Oldenburg. Delmenhorst later was infamous for its robber-baronship under the count Gerhard VI of Oldenburg. Its reign ended in 1482 thanks to a siege laid to the castle under the leadership of the bishop of Münster. Therefore, the town now was under Münster authority until finally count Anton I won back the town as well as the castle in 1547.

When the last heir of Anton, Christian, died in 1647, Delmenhorst again fell under Oldenburg custody. As Oldenburg belonged to Danish kings and the Oldenburg regent of that time was a relative of the Danish king, Delmenhorst was thereafter under Danish control.

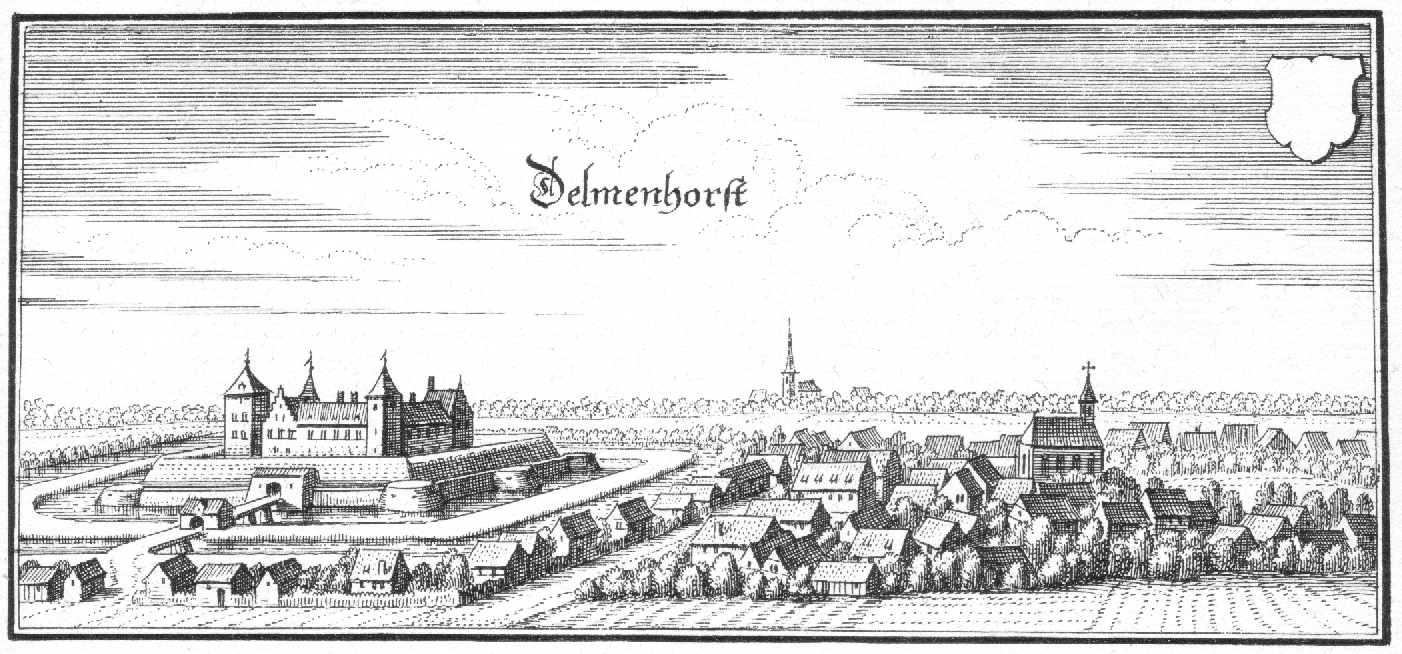
Delmenhorst in 1647

In 1767, Delmenhorst was bought by Tsarina Catherine II, but was given up to new Oldenburg in 1773. In 1777, Delmenhorst was declared a dukedom of Oldenburg. In 1806, a French and Dutch army occupied the territory; Delmenhorst was a part of the French empire under Napoleon from 1811 to 1813.

In the industrial age, Delmenhorst experienced great economic growth, thanks to Bremen. Since Bremen was in a different duty zone, merchants who wanted to export manufactured goods outside of Bremen had to pay high customs duties. They therefore only exported the resources and produced their commodities in the surrounding villages. The industries arising were the Jute - a spinning works and weavery in 1871, the Delmenhorster Linoleumfabrik - a linoleum factory, in 1882, the Norddeutsche Wollkämmerei und Kammgarnspinnerei or Nordwolle - another, bigger spinning works, and several others. The number of inhabitants quadrupled in these years.

In 1903, Delmenhorst was declared kreisfrei, meaning it was under its own regentship, not having to obey any other county. In the 1930s, Great Depression the Nordwolle went bankrupt - nevertheless the town grew bigger, incorporating several smaller villages around it. On Kristallnacht in November 1938, the synagogue was burnt down by the Nazis, who had come to power in Germany in 1933. After the Second World War, Delmenhorst was in the British zone of occupation and had to deal with thousands of refugees from Eastern Germany, which now was occupied by the Soviet Union. The British-appointed mayor during the British Occupation was Major Jack Wolfe, an inspector of the British Constabulary. In 1950, more than 57,000 people lived in Delmenhorst.

Since the 1960s, there has been a steady decrease in employment, leaving more than 13% of the town's inhabitants unemployed and nearly 7% living on social welfare. In the year 2000, Delmenhorst was an outpost of the Hanover-based Expo 2000.

The Hanse-Wissenschaftskolleg (HWK) Institute for Advanced Study is located at Delmenhorst, in the neighborhood of Deichhorst. The HWK promotes collaboration between and among international research scientists and artists, many of whom are housed on the HWK grounds. The public is engaged through a public lecture series. The research areas of focus are energy, earth, brain, and society.

Largest groups of foreign residents
Nationality	Population (31 December 2018)
Turkey	2,334
Syria	1,676
Poland	1,409
Bulgaria	1,328
Romania	1,151
Iraq	973
Afghanistan	332
Greece	324
Russia	261
Ukraine	200

== Mayors ==
- Erich Koch-Weser: 1901–1909
- Hermann Hadenfeldt: 1909–1919
- Rudolf Königer: 1919–1933
- Wilhelm Müller: 1933–1937
- Hermann Maas: 1937–1945
- Walter Kleine: 1945–1945
- Johann Schmidt(1870-1949): 1945–1946
- Wilhelm von der Heyde: 1946–1955
- Anton Eickmeier (1912-1955): 1955–1955
- Hans Albers: 1955–1956
- Wilhelm von der Heyde (1885-1972): 1956–1968
- Ernst Eckert (1904-2004): 1968–1974
- Harald Groth (born 1943): 1974–1976
- Otto Jenzok (1928-1984): 1976–1984
- Walter Löwe: 1984–1986
- Erwin Pelka: 1986–1986
- Jürgen Thölke (born 1934): 1986–2001
- Carsten Schwettmann: 2001–2006
- Patrick de La Lanne (born 1962): 2006–2014
- Axel Jahnz: 2014-2021
- Petra Gerlach: since 2021

== Main sights ==
The landmark of the town is the water tower complex with the adjacent town hall, built from 1910 to 1914 by architect Heinz Stoffregen.

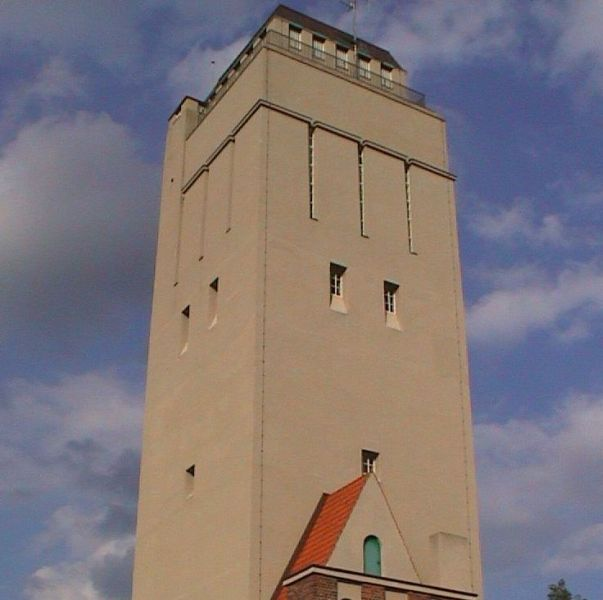
The water tower

Another interesting place is the Burginsel (Castle Island), in which the old castle existed in medieval times. The construction was torn down during the 18th century. Today a park (called the Graft) occupies the grounds of the old castle.

The industrial history of the town is presented by the Nordwolle Museum, an Anchor Point of ERIH, The European Route of Industrial Heritage.

== Twin towns – sister cities ==
Delmenhorst is twinned with:

- Allonnes, France
- Borisoglebsk, Russia
- Eberswalde, Germany
- Kolding, Denmark
- Lublin, Poland

== Notable people ==
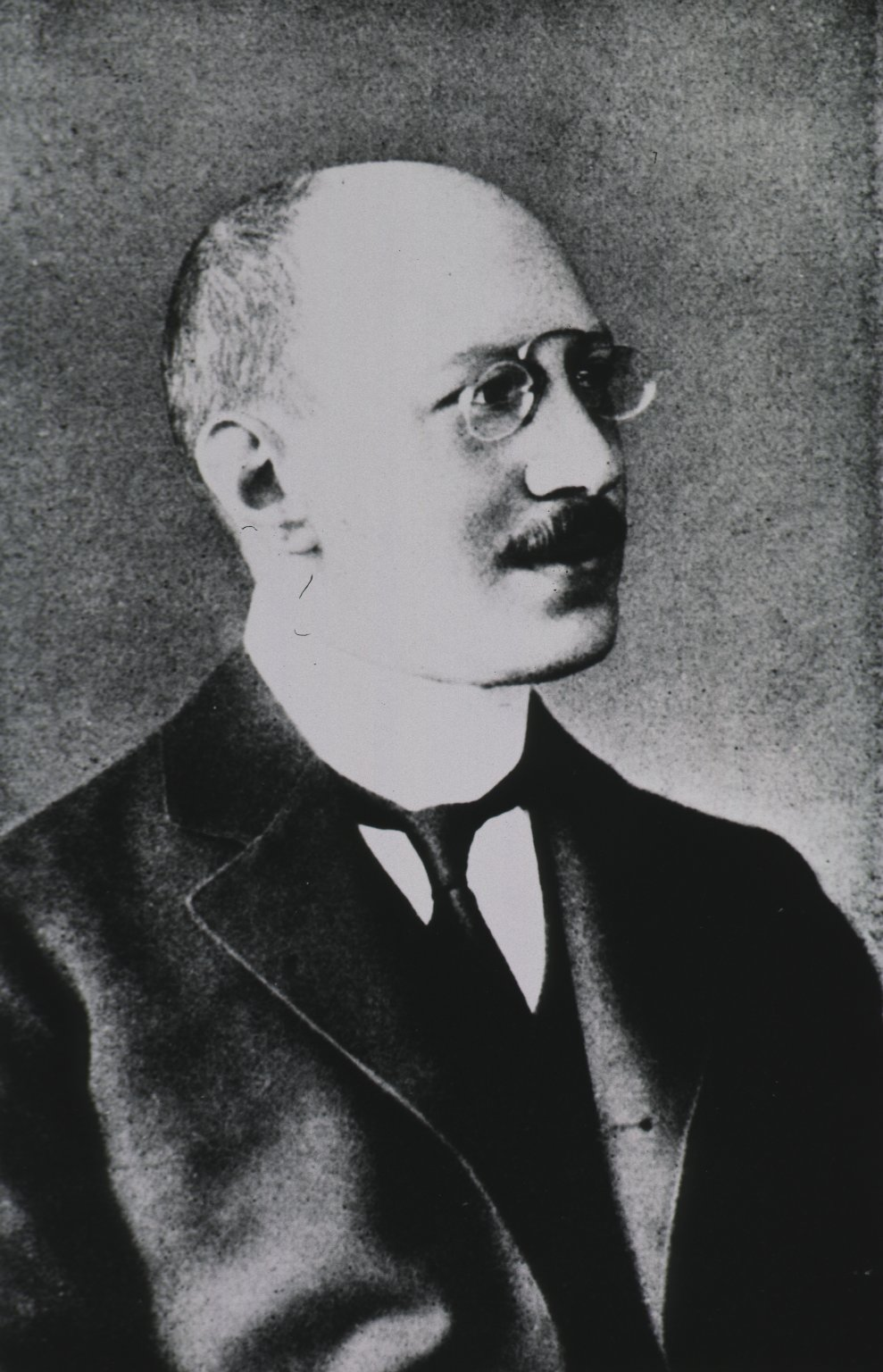
Iwan Bloch, pre-1920

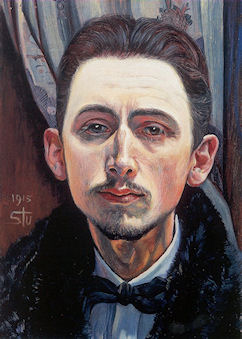
Fritz Stuckenberg, 1915

- August Kühnel (1645-ca. 1700), composer and viola da gamba performer (Baroque music)
- Karl Friederichs (1831-1871), classical philologist and archaeologist
- Hermann Rieck (ca 1837-1921), pioneer farmer in New South Wales, Australia, founded the local banana industry
- Arthur Fitger (1840–1909), painter, art critic, playwright and poet.
- Iwan Bloch (1872–1922), physician and sexologist
- Fritz Stuckenberg (1881–1944), painter, brought up locally
- Karl Dempwolf (1939-2026), Dutch-American contemporary painter
- Wolfgang Michels (1951–2017), musician, singer, composer and author
- Volker Wieker (born 1954), retired Inspector General of the Bundeswehr
- Gerd U. Auffarth (born 1964), Professor of Ophthalmology, Heidelberg University
- Claudia Kemfert (born 1968), environmental economist and energy expert
- Tim Fischer, (DE Wiki) (born 1973), composer and actor
- Ernst-Marcus Thomas (born 1973), actor, TV host, radio DJ and writer.
- Christian Dürr (born 1977), politician (FDP)
- Nils Dörgeloh (born 1979), a German actor.

=== Sport ===
- Reinhard Kuretzky (born 1947), athlete, pole vaulter
- Hüseyin Eroğlu (born 1972), a Turkish-German football coach and former player; played over 300 games
- Sandra Auffarth (born 1986), equestrian; gold, silver and bronze Olympic medallist
- Patrick Drewes (born 1993), football goalkeeper, played over 200 games

=== Associated with the city ===
- Gerhard VI, Count of Oldenburg (1430–1500), ruler of the castle of Delmenhorst
- Henrich Focke (1890–1979), co-founder of Focke-Wulf, manufacturer of civil and military aircraft
- Walter Többens (1909–1954), textile entrepreneur with production and trading
- Hans-Joachim Hespos (1938–2022), composer, founded the concert series 11.11 new music in Delmenhorst
- Sarah Connor (born 1980), singer and "honorary messenger" of the city since 2003
