= Ratskeller =

German term for bar or restaurant located in the basement of a city hall

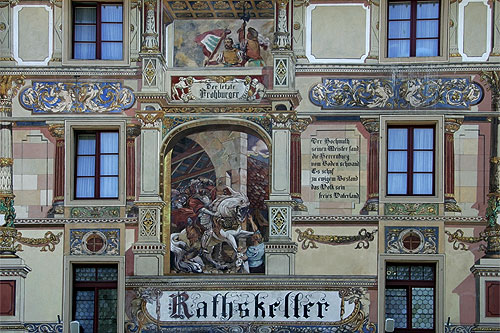
The Rathskeller in Olten, Switzerland

Ratskeller (German: "council's cellar", pl. Ratskeller, historically Rathskeller) is a name in German-speaking countries for a bar or restaurant located in the basement of a city hall (Rathaus) or nearby. Many taverns, nightclubs, bars and similar establishments throughout the world use the term.

== Notable examples ==
=== Germany ===
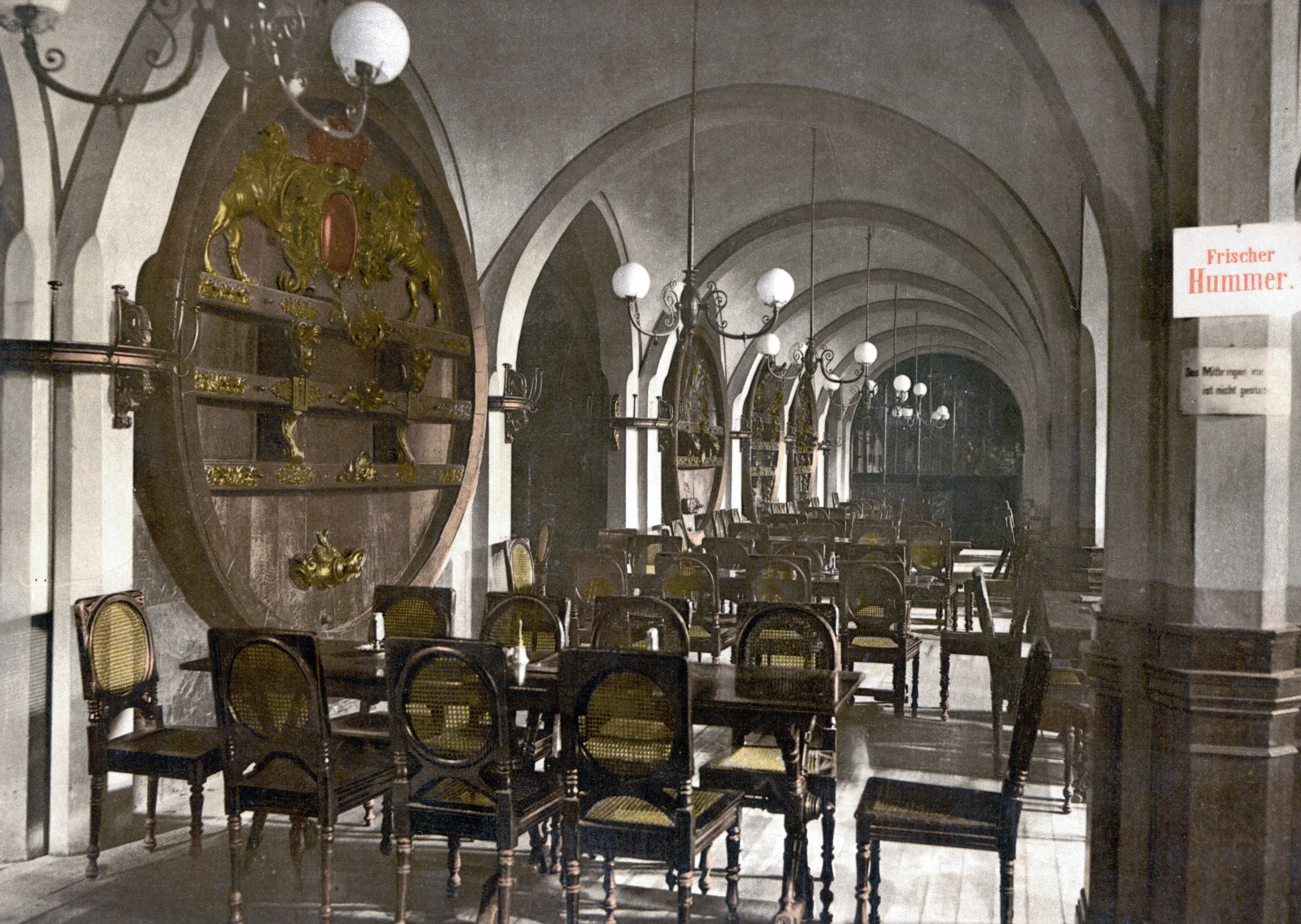
The Bremen Ratskeller, c. 1900

The Bremen Ratskeller, erected in 1405, has one of the oldest wine cellars in Germany and was a centre of the wine trade in Bremen.

The Ratskeller in Lübeck is one of the oldest in northern Germany, with parts dating from the Romanesque era. The earliest documented use for wine storage dates from circa 1220.

=== North America ===
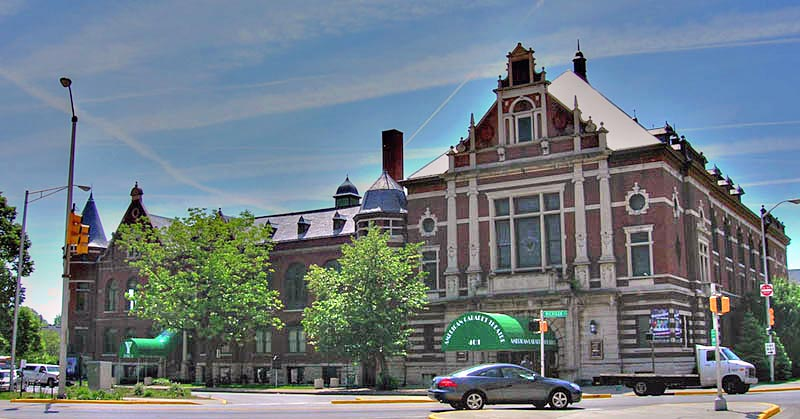
The former Das Deutsche Haus in Indianapolis, today known as the Athenaeum

The Athenæum (Das Deutsche Haus) Ratskeller restaurant in Indianapolis, known as the Athenaeum, received historic landmark status and has served Bavarian cuisine since 1894.

The California Hall (formerly Das Deutches Haus) was built in 1912 in San Francisco and had a Rathskeller restaurant in the basement.

The Rathskeller in Boston was a famous rock and roll club from 1974 to 1997, a focus of Boston's alternative rock scene, hosting local bands like The Cars and Pixies as well as many other bands such as The Police and Metallica before they achieved breakthrough fame.

The Minnesota State Capitol, completed in 1905, contains a Rathskeller that was renovated in 2017. It contains 29 painted German mottoes and currently serves as a cafe.

The Rathskeller & Gardens, in State College, Pennsylvania, adjacent to the University Park campus of Penn State University, was opened by State College resident, "Pop" Flood, three days after the repeal of Prohibition in 1933. In 1934, Flood sold to C.C. “Doggie” Alexander, who changed the name to "The All-American Rathskeller", the name that remained with the bar until it closed on January 28, 2018. It later reopened as Doggie's Pub in July, 2018 in its original location adjacent a new beer garden and pizza kitchen.

== Campus dining ==
Many universities and public institutions have pubs or student center dining facilities located in repurposed basements. To market these nontraditional eating locations, many are termed "Ratskeller" or some variation thereof.

- Binghamton University: The original SUNY rathskeller and often referred to as "The Rat".
- Kent State University: KSU’s Rathskeller, shortened to “The Rat”, is in the basement of the student center, and has been active to varying degrees since the 1970s. It had a stage for live music and had served food and alcohol to students of age into the early 2000s.
- Boston College ("The Rat")
- Colorado State University ("The Ramskeller")
- Union College ("The Rathskeller", known as "Skeller" among students, located under The Old Chapel)
- University of North Carolina ("The Ram's Head Rathskeller", better known as "The Rat", opened in 1948 and closed in 2008)
- University of Wisconsin–Madison ("Der Rathskeller") Der Rathskeller opened in 1928 as a gathering place for male students but would be opened to female students in 1941. Though modeled after a German beer hall, it would not be until 1933 that Der Rathskeller sold its first beer, making the UW the first public university in the United States to serve beer on campus.
- University at Buffalo (SUNY) had a facility called The Rathskeller that served food, alcohol, and occasionally had live music. It was housed in Squire Hall, and closed for good when that building was renovated starting in 1982.
- University of California, San Diego: Muir College had a facility called The Rathskeller that served food and non-alcoholic drinks. It was housed in Muir Commons, but was later replaced by the El Mercado restaurant.
- McMaster University had a student pub called The Rathskeller for over thirty years, in the basement of The Refectory dining hall. It closed in the early 2000s and was replaced with a restaurant.
- University of Florida: Built in the 1960s, the Rathskeller was a dining hall, bar and concert venue. Irish rock group U2 played at this venue on the second U.S. leg of their Boy tour to a crowd of over 700 attendees in 1981. UF President Stephen O'Connell worked in the dining hall as a youth. The venue closed in 1987 after a grease fire caused extensive damage.
- University of Miami ("The Rat")
- Florida Institute of Technology ("Rathskeller Eatery & Convenience Store", known as "The Rat" among students)
- Oberlin College (also known as "the Rat")
- The College of New Jersey (TCNJ): TCNJ’s Rathskeller, commonly known as “The Rat,” was a popular campus pub and dining venue located in the basement of the Brower Student Center. It opened in 1976 and became a central social hub for students, hosting live music, open mic nights, and other events. The venue closed in 2015 as part of renovations to the student center, marking the end of its nearly 40-year history on campus.

== See also ==
- Beer garden
- Beer hall
- Index of drinking establishment-related articles
