= Arthur Fitger =

German painter, art critic, playwright and poet (1840–1909)

Arthur Heinrich Wilhelm Fitger
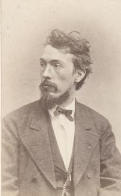
- Arthur Fitger
- Born: 4 October 1840; Delmenhorst, Germany
- Died: 28 June 1909 (aged 68); Horn near Bremen, Germany
- Known for: painting, art criticism, playwriting, poetry
- Awards: 1892-1893 Columbian Exposition-Chicago World's Fair- Gold Prize

Arthur Heinrich Wilhelm Fitger (4 October 1840 – 28 June 1909) was a German painter, art critic, playwright and poet.

== Biography ==
Arthur Fitger was one of the ten children of Delmenhorst (Grand Duchy of Oldenburg) postmaster Ratsherr Peter Diedrich Fitger (1804–1865). Ratsherr was a hereditary title granted to his grandfather Heinrich Fitger and lineal male descendants (Fitger; see Salic law) since battlefield action in the Seven Years' War. Peter's wife was Clara Maria Caroline Plate (1815–1891), whose mother, Caroline (Arthur's grandmother), was raised the daughter of a Holstein Countess Reventlow on the Noer estate and married Court Counsellor Franz Plate in 1800 in Eutin. At the time of her marriage to Arthur's father, Clara Maria Caroline was widowed (Dony) with two daughters.

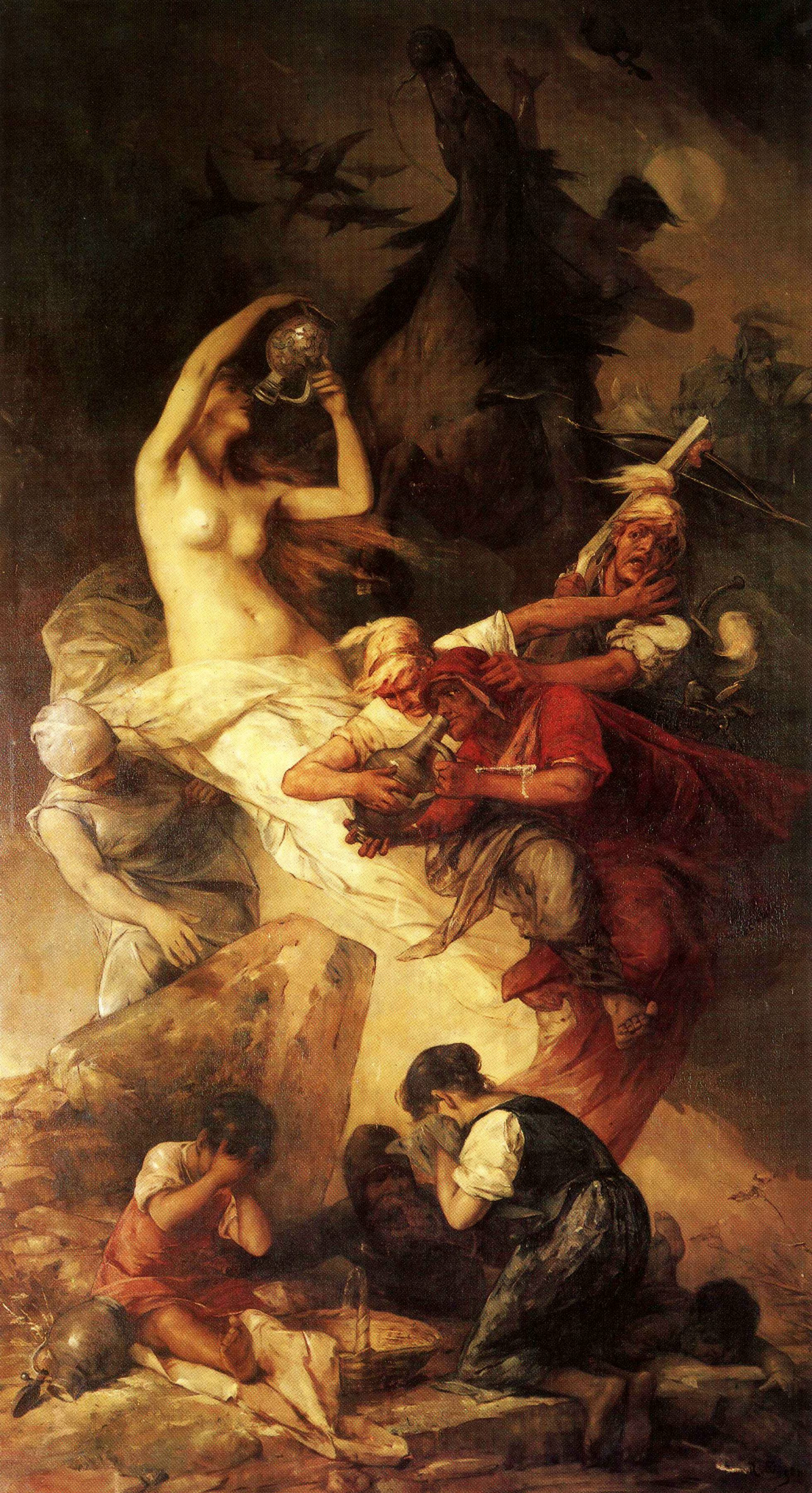
Der getreue Ekkehard

Fitger grew up in the grand ducal Posthaus in Delmenhorst which was also an inn which functioned as stopover for change of horses (postillions) and postal/customs exchange between Oldenburg and Bremen (part of the Thurn und Taxis network of the Holy Roman Empire). His younger brother Emil Fitger (born 15 December 1848 in Delmenhorst, died 9 April 1917 in Bremen) was editor in chief of the Weser-Zeitung in Bremen for many years. Fitger attended the Volks- und Rektorschule in Delmenhorst and then the gymnasium in Oldenburg, where he lived at the home of Baurat Otto Lasius (1797–1888).

=== Painting ===
In 1858, Fitger went to the Akademie zu München, where he studied under Moritz von Schwind (1804–1875), Peter von Cornelius (1783–1867) and Bonaventura Genelli (1798–1868). He went to Antwerp in 1861 and then to Paris. From 1863 to 1865, he stayed in Rome, supported by a scholarship from Oldenburg's grand duke. Then he spent the following years alternately in Vienna und Berlin before moving to Bremen in 1869.

Fitger became known for his large decorative works, executed chiefly at Bremen. He decorated the Rembertikirche with two pictures: "The lost son" and "The Merciful Samaritan." He did a frieze for the bourse with maritime allegories. His works also appeared in the Haus Seefahrt and the Reichspostgebäude. Influenced by the Franco-Prussian War in 1870, he produced the portable artwork "Barbarossa's Awakening," which spread his reputation further. In 1875, he was given the task of decorating the Ratskeller with murals. From 1883 to 1884 he painted large murals in the Kunsthalle Hamburg. After this he returned to Bremen where he painted murals of nymphs and centaurs in Imperial Hall of the new Imperial Post Office Building.

Originally painting in the style of Cornelius and Genelli, he later used colour in a more modern manner, similar to Hans Makart (1840–1884). Fitger was awarded a gold medal for his "Icarus" painting when exhibited at the 1892-1893 Chicago World's Fair (Columbian Exhibition)

=== Writing ===
Fitger was also well known for his writing. His plays, Adalbert von Bremen (Oldenburg 1873; 2nd edition with the sequel Hie Reich! Hie Rom! ["Here Empire! Here Rome!"], 1875), Die Hexe ("The witch," Oldenburg, 1878; 4th edition, 1885), Von Gottes Gnaden ("From the grace of God," 2nd edition, Oldenburg, 1884) have often been performed. He also wrote Albrecht Dürer, Johann Kepler and Michelangelo and the epic poem Roland und die Rose (1871) for the Bremer Künstlerverein. Fitger's most important written works are the poetry collections Fahrendes Volk ("Traveling people," 2nd edition, Oldenburg, 1883) und Winternächte ("Winter nights," Oldenburg, 1880). He also rendered into German (1886) Lord Byron's Marino Faliero, and for the Denkmale der Geschichte und Kunst Bremens ("Memorials of the history and art of Bremen," 1877) prepared a history of the local cathedral.

=== Art criticism ===
Fitger was regarded as an important person in art in Bremen around 1900. His art criticisms, published in the press, had a lasting influence on Hanseatic taste in art. He was chairman of the Kunstverein, and kept a conservative outlook on art. He strongly criticised artists who followed fashions that were modern at that time, including the Künstlerkolonie Worpswede and the contemporary French painters. The most striking example of his criticism was a comment on an attempt by Marie Bock and Paula Becker to exhibit in the Kunsthalle Bremen at the end of 1899. It appeared in the Weser-Zeitung, which was edited by his brother, Emil, at the time:

Für die Arbeiten der beiden genannten Damen reicht der Wörterschatz einer reinlichen Sprache nicht aus, und bei einer unreinlichen wollen wir keine Anleihe machen.

which means:

To describe the work of the two ladies, the vocabulary of a clean language does not suffice, and we do not wish to borrow from an unclean one.

However, his criticism was unable to prevent a breakthrough of the Künstlerkolonie Worpswede.

== See also ==
- List of German painters
