= Bremen Ratskeller =

German wine cellar

Coordinates: 53°04′34″N 8°48′29″E

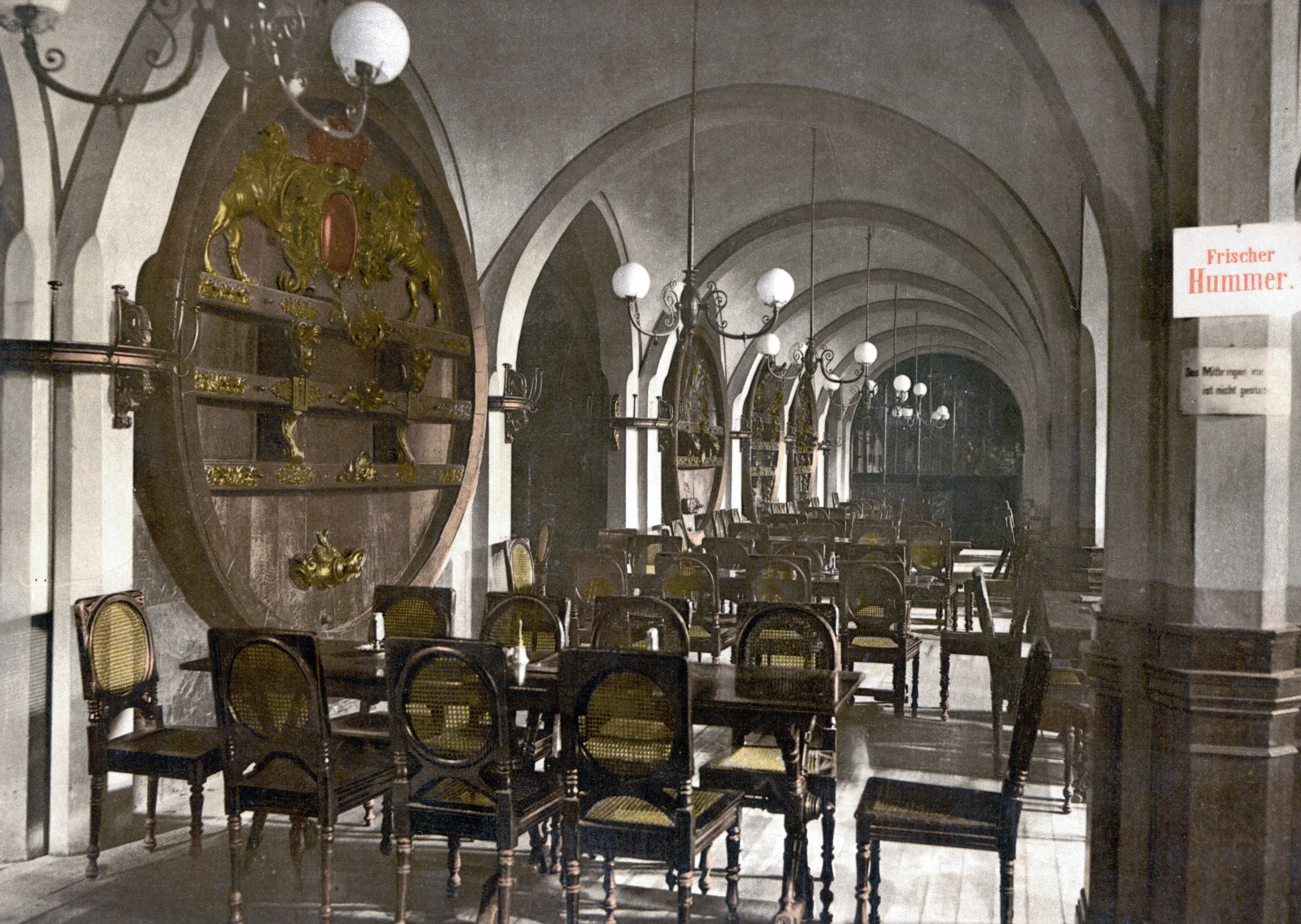
The Ratskeller around 1900

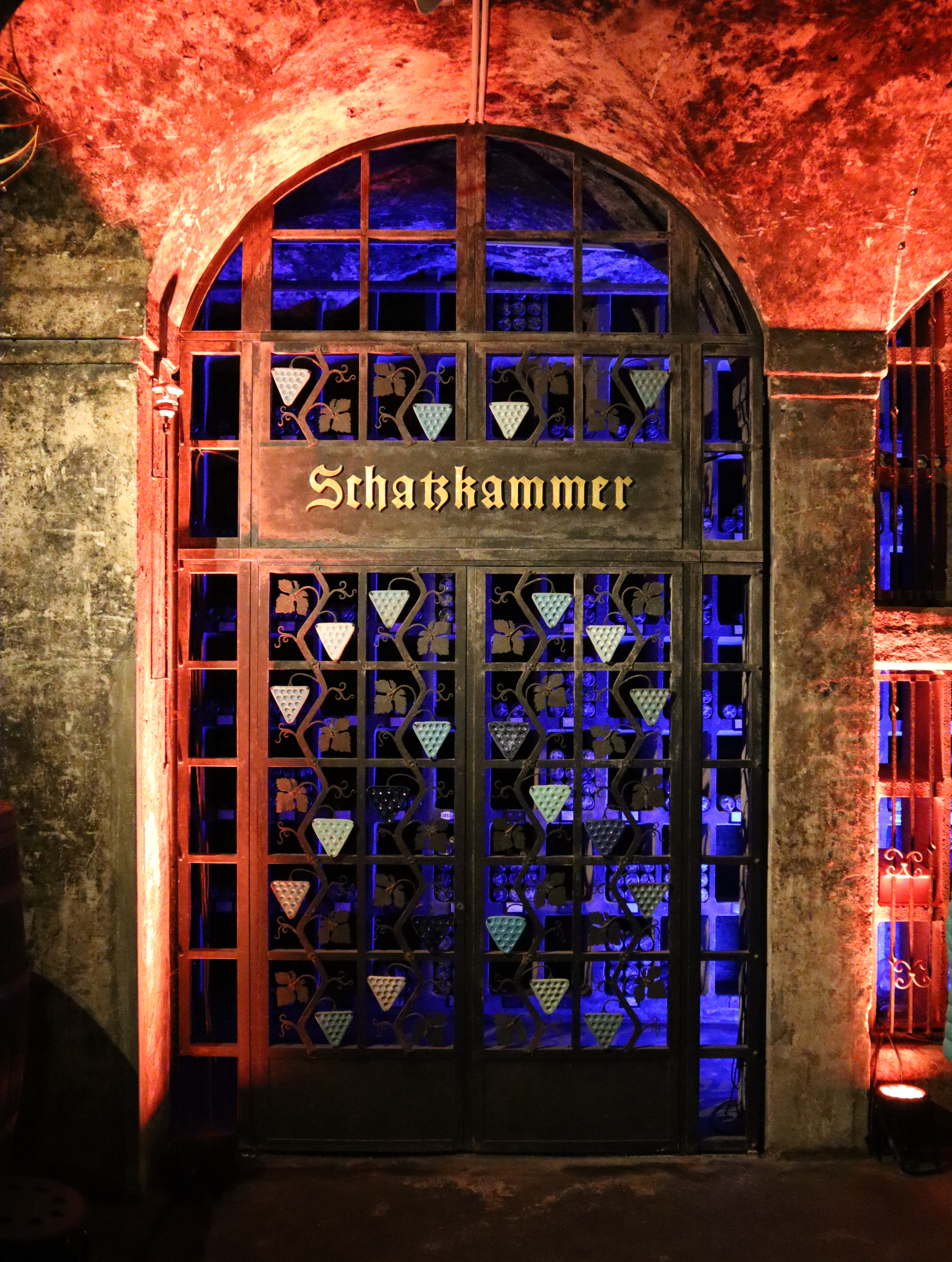
Treasure chamber in the Ratskeller in which the most valuable wines are stored

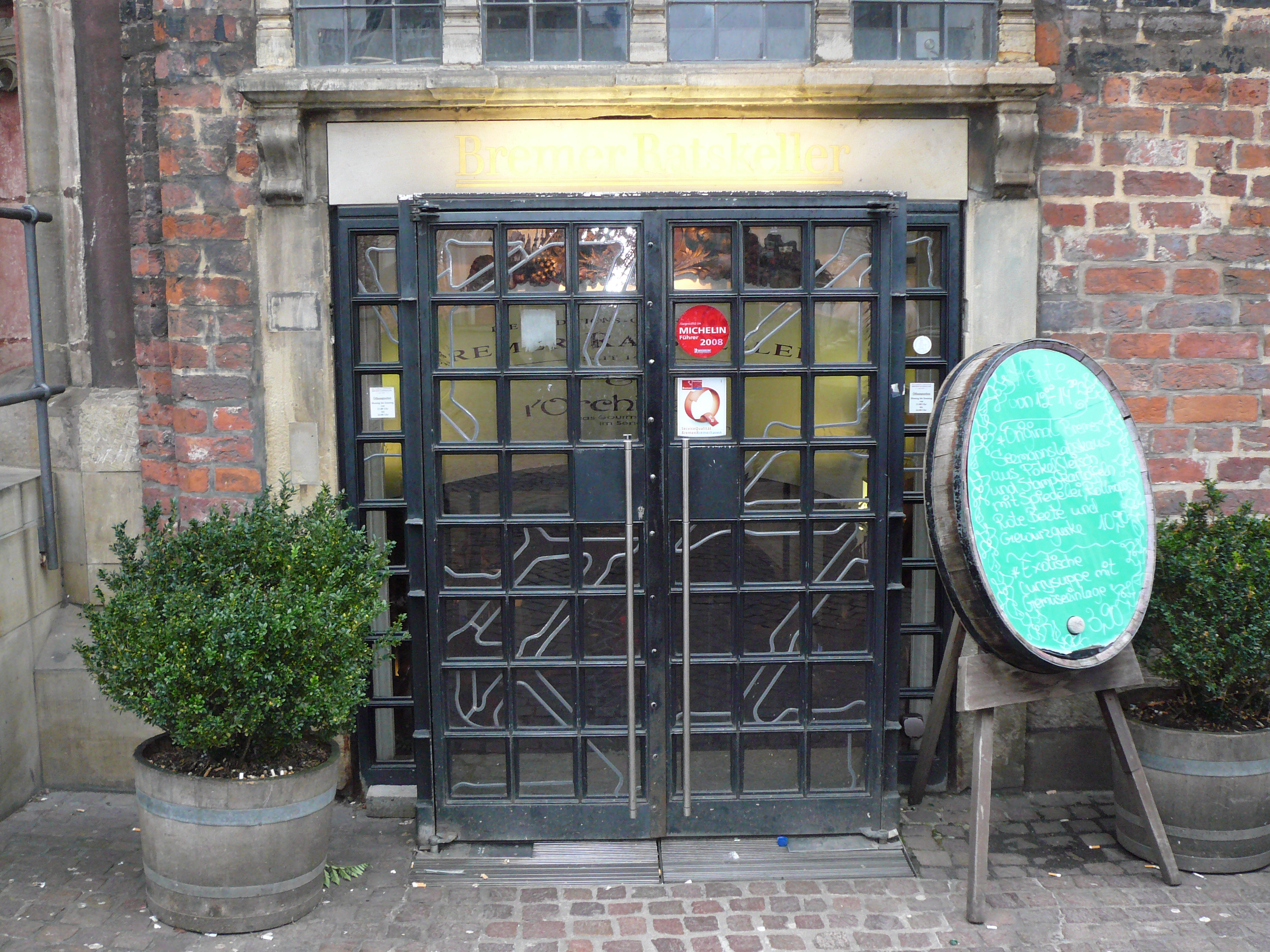
The main entrance today

The Bremen Ratskeller is the council wine cellar (German: "Ratskeller") of the Townhall of Bremen. Since it was erected in the year 1405, German wines were stored and sold there. With its history over 600 years the Ratskeller of Bremen is one of the oldest wine cellars of Germany, furthermore the oldest wine barrel of Germany, a wine from Rüdesheim which is dated 1653, is stored here.

In the cellar there has long been a traditional tavern and today a large part of it is a gourmet restaurant.

== History ==
Since 1330, the Council of Bremen held the privilege of white wine which was valid until 1815. No citizen could sell wine without the permission of the council. All wines had to be stored in the Cellar of the council. The purpose was to control the prices and the payment of taxes.

With about 650 varieties the Ratskeller has the world's greatest selection of German wines exclusively; in total, there are about 1,200 different spirits available.

== Rooms of the cellar ==
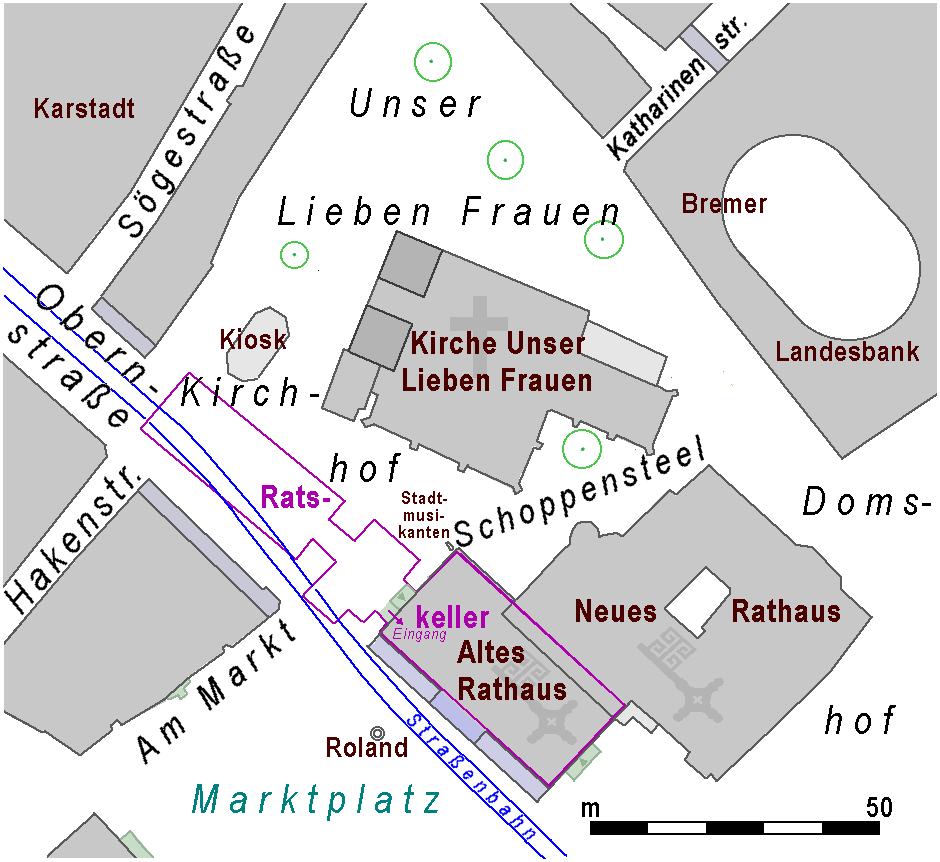
Extension of the Ratskeller below the townhall and the neighbouring square west of it

- The large Hall
- In front of the Bacchus
- Hauff's Hall
- The Rose Cellar
- The Rooms for the Senate of Bremen and the Kaiser
- The Bacchus Cellar
- Treasure Room

== Famous guests ==
- Johannes Brahms
- Otto von Bismarck
- Max Bruch
- Emil du Bois-Reymond
- Hoffmann von Fallersleben
- Arthur Fitger
- Theodor Fontane
- Nikolai Gogol
- Patrick Gordon of Auchleuchries
- Wilhelm Hauff
- Gerhart Hauptmann
- Heinrich Heine
- Adolf Hitler
- Helmuth von Moltke the Elder
- Richard Strauss
- Richard Wagner
- Karl Maria von Weber
- Kaiser Wilhelm I
- Kaiser Wilhelm II

== See also ==
- List of oldest companies

== Literature ==
- Hermann Entholt: The Ratskeller in Bremen. Translated from the German by Harold Styring, Bremen 1930.
