= Ernst-Marcus Thomas =

German television host (born 1973)

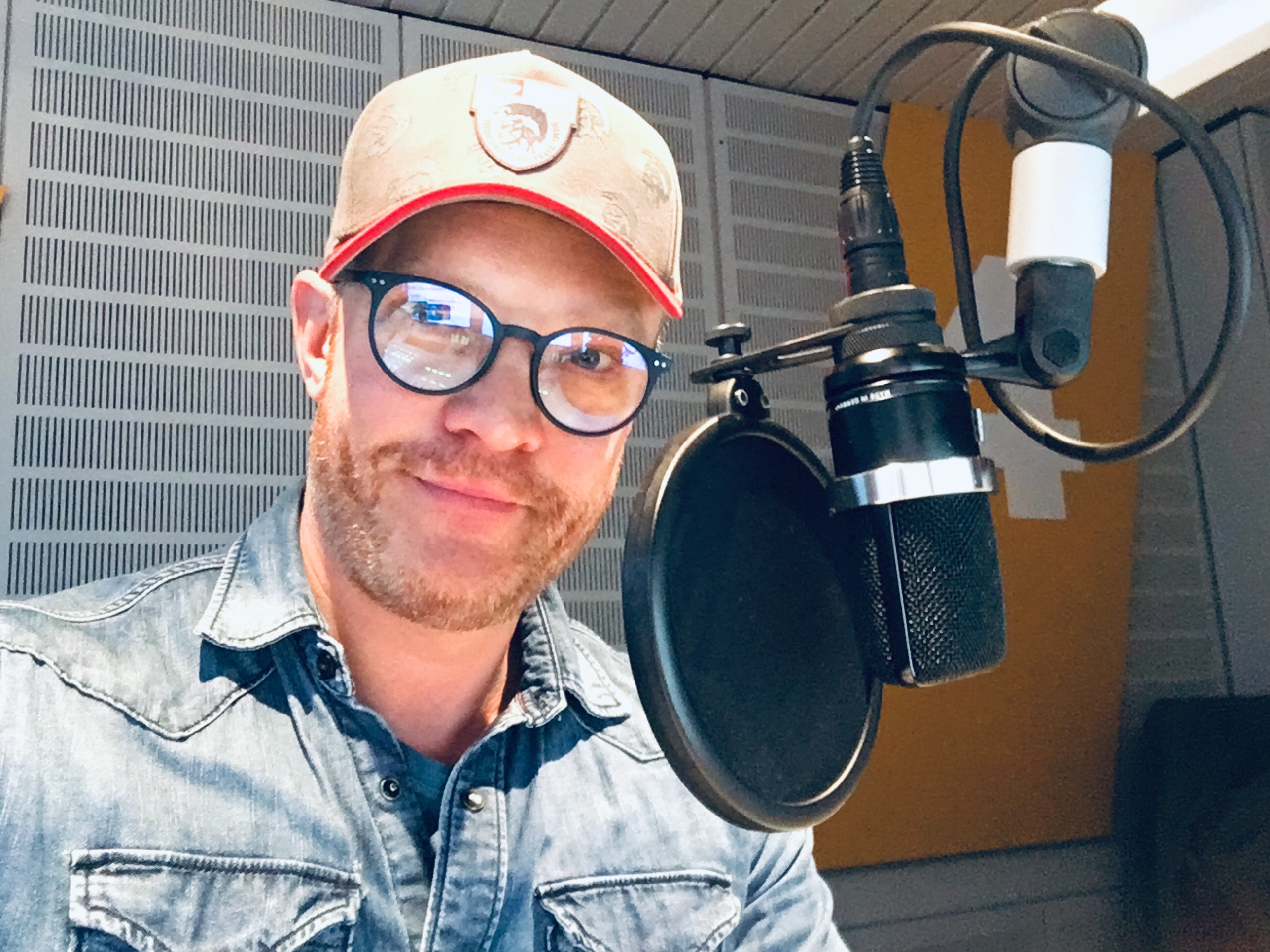
- Headshot of voice actor Ernst-Marcus Thomas
- Born: 23 March 1973 (age 53); Delmenhorst, Lower Saxony, Germany
- Occupations: Actor; television host; radio DJ; writer
- Website: Archived 16 June 2021 at the Wayback Machine

Ernst-Marcus Thomas (born 23 March 1973) is a German actor, TV host, radio DJ and writer. From 2011 until 2021, he hosted The Afternoon Show on WDR 4 in Germany. For the past 20 years, Thomas has been a host for many live programs in Germany and Switzerland, including the national entertainment show, ZDF Fernsehgarten, and the daily cooking show, ARD Buffet, which aired on Germany's national TV channel, ARD.

Thomas studied drama and psychology at LMU Munich and graduated with a Master of Arts. He also followed an education as a newspaper editor at Augsburger Allgemeine Zeitung, a major German daily newspaper.

Through his company, Charismedia, Thomas coaches CEOs and top managers throughout Europe on public speaking. He's also a lecturer at the Zurich University of Applied Sciences and the ARD.ZDF Media-Academy.

In 2015, Thomas published the best-selling nonfiction book Der Perfekte Auftritt (The Perfect Performance) about the art of public speaking. In 2018/19, Thomas played a part in the action-comedy The Spy Who Dumped Me starring Mila Kunis and Kate McKinnon. The movie was partly filmed in Thomas' hometown of Amsterdam.

His book Relationship Tango. How we Subconsciously Sabotage Love is a psychological essay, published in 2020. In July 2020 Thomas published his first foray into fiction: 'The Dead Don't Play Piano' is an Amsterdam-based detective story, for which Thomas used the alias 'Kees van Kikkerland'. Kikkerland ('land of the frogs') refers to the tongue-in-cheek synonym the Dutch are using for the Netherlands.

In recent years Thomas has been lending his German voice to international authors, especially from the U.S., producing their German audiobooks, with 50-plus productions available on Audible.

== TV credits ==
- 2018: The Spy Who Dumped Me, director: Susanna Fogel.
- 2013: Schimanski, director: Kaspar Heidelbach.
- 2012: Süskind, dubbing actor. director: Rudolf van den Berg.
- 2012: Moderation "Ernst-Marcus Thomas - Der Talk" bei Sat.1.
- since 2011: Radio host at public German broadcasting company WDR4, WDR 4.
- 2008: Wege zum Glück, director: Petra Wiemers
- 2008: ZDF-Fernsehgarten, ZDF.
- 2006–2009: EMT Talk, Star TV Switzerland.
- 2003–2008: ARD-Buffet, ARD.
- 2005–2007: Plietsch, NDR.
- 2006: NDR Talkshow, NDR.
- 2006: ARD-Advisor: Technics, ARD.
- 2006: TV-Fans, NDR.
- 2004–2006: Das!, NDR.
- 2005: Harbour Stories, NDR.
- 2002–2005: Olis Wild World, KI.KA.
- 2001: Die Kommissarin, (episode: "Todeskuriere"), director: Charly Weller
- 2000: Marienhof, 15 episodes, character: Dario, director: Dieter Schlotterbeck
- 1998–2002: Philipp's Animal Hour, KI.KA/ARD.

== Books ==
- Theater in der Zirkuskuppel ("Theater at the Circus dome"). Grin, Munich 2002. ISBN 978-3-8386-6647-1
- Traumberuf Moderator ("Dream Job TV host"). Hinter den Kulissen der TV-Welt. Tectum, Marburg 2015. ISBN 978-3-8288-3532-0
- Der perfekte Auftritt ("The Perfect Performance"). Haufe, Freiburg 2015. 3rd revised edition: 2019 ISBN 978-3-648-07104-5
- Beziehungs-Tango ("Relationship Tango. How we subconsciously sabotage love"). Hogrefe, Bern (CH) 2020 ISBN 978-3-456-86035-0
- Tote spielen kein Klavier ("The Dead Don't Play Piano"). Piper, Munich 2020 ISBN 978-3-492-50359-4

== Sources ==
- Ernst-Marcus Thomas at IMDb
- Spiegel Online
