= Die Glocke (Bremen) =

Concert hall in Bermen, Germany

Coordinates: 53°4′30″N 8°48′34″E

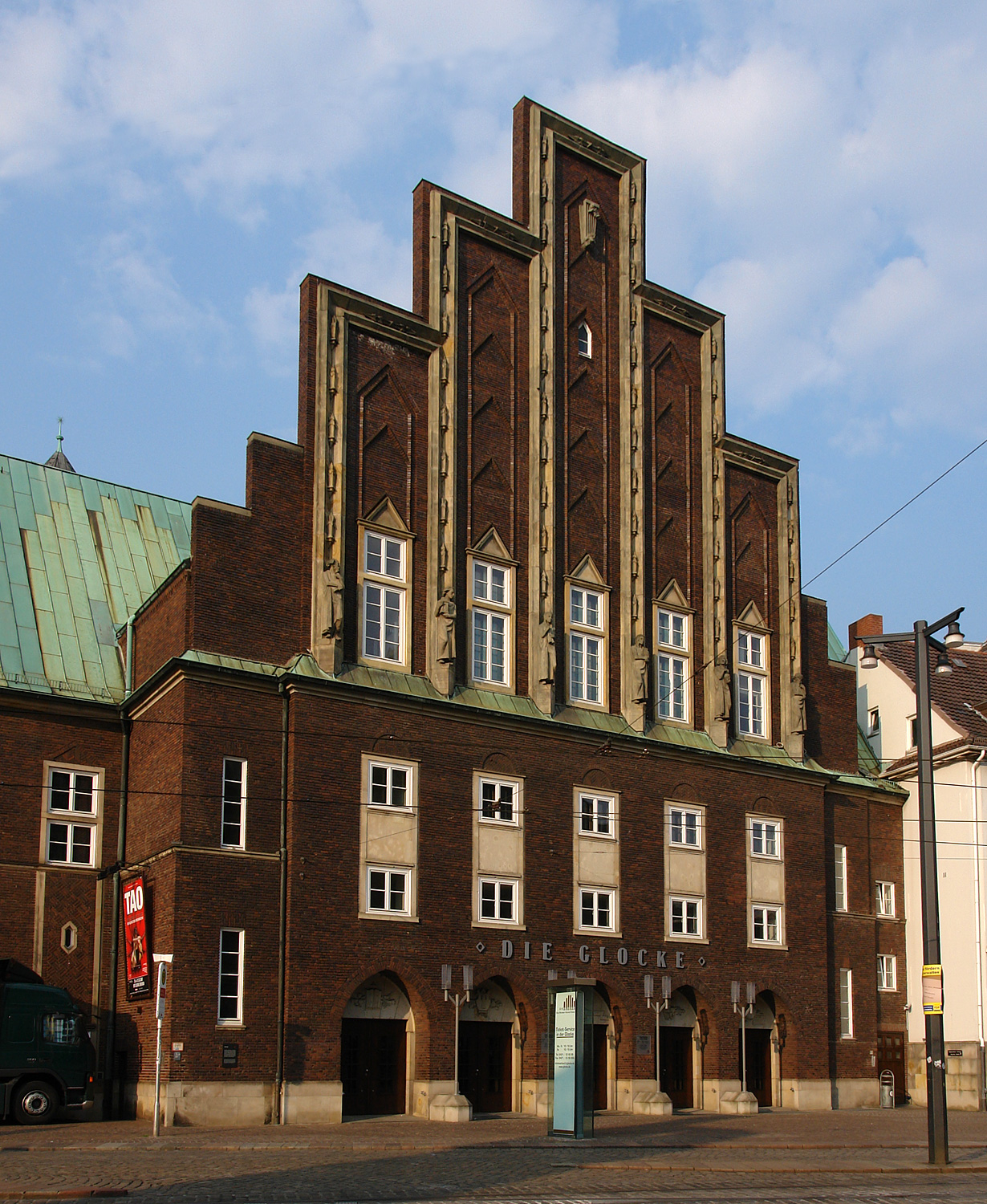
Die Glocke, Bremen

Die Glocke (The Bell) is a concert hall in the centre of Bremen, Germany. Standing on the site of a building from the Middle Ages, it was designed by Walter Görig (1885–1974) and completed in 1928.

== History ==
In the Middle Ages, the octagonal bell-shaped (hence its name) chapter house of the cathedral stood south of it on the Domsheide in the Dombezirk, an enclave under the sovereignty and legal control of the cathedral. It was the venue for the meetings of the chapter and, from 1648, for the deliberations of the court. In 1737, a new octagonal building was constructed on the site, coming under the authority of the City of Bremen in 1803. From 1857, it belonged to the Künstlerverein (Artists Association).

After a fire in 1915, the old Glocke building was demolished, making way for a new concert hall with the same name, designed by Walter Görig (1885–1974) and completed in 1928. Built of dark brick with limited use of stone, the building's imposing stepped gable faces the Domsheide while the facade overlooking the Grasmarkt has modestly designed oriel bays in deference to the cathedral. The building underwent comprehensive refurbishment between 1995 and 1997 when the architects Gerhard Müller-Mencken and Klaus Rosenbusch combined the need for preservation with the demands of a modern concert hall. While maintaining the hall's unique acoustics, they restored the original Art Deco finish and installed up-to-date technical equipment.

The hall's elegant Art Deco design and excellent acoustics have been praised by a number of artists including the conductor Herbert von Karajan, Anne-Sophie Mutter and Gidon Kremer. Karajan rated this hall as in the top three in Europe. The paintings by Karl Dannemann illustrating the Saga of the Bell in the restaurant date from the opening of the new building in the late 1920s.

In 2024, the government of Bremen decided to modernize the concert hall for 53 million euros. The federal government wants to cover half of the total costs.

== Organ ==
The organ was built by Wilhelm Sauer from Frankfurt an der Oder in 1928. It has 76 registers, four manuals and a pedal. In 2008, Christian Scheffer completed a major restoration, reconstructing the original pneumatic action, now electrically powered.

== Presentations ==
In addition to classical concerts, Die Glocke is used for a variety of presentations including jazz concerts, cabaret, drama and lectures as well as special events for families and children. The large hall (Großer Saal) seats 1,400 while the small hall (Kleiner Saal) with 395 seats can also be used for receptions and meetings.
