= Bremen Main Post Office Building =

Neo-Renaissance building in Bremen, Germany

Coordinates: 53.0742°N 8.8094°E

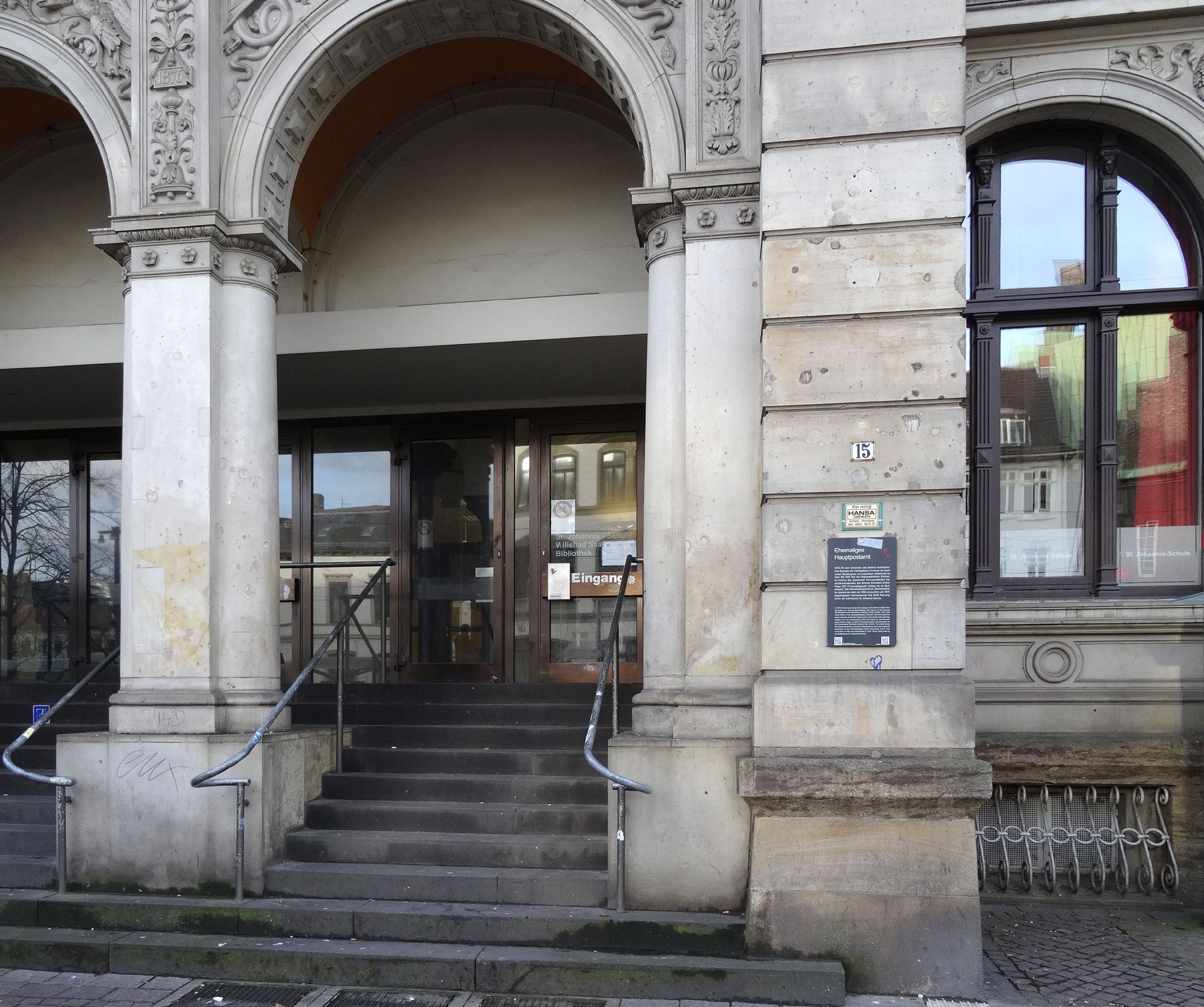
- entrance
- Established: 1878
- Location: Domsheide 15, Bremen

The Bremen Main Post Office Building (German: Ehemaliges Hauptpostamt) or (German: Kaiserliche Oberpostdirektion) is a Neo-Renaissance building in Bremen, Germany, that used to be the Imperial Post Office for the Bremen area. The building stands on the city square named Domsheide.

== Building history ==
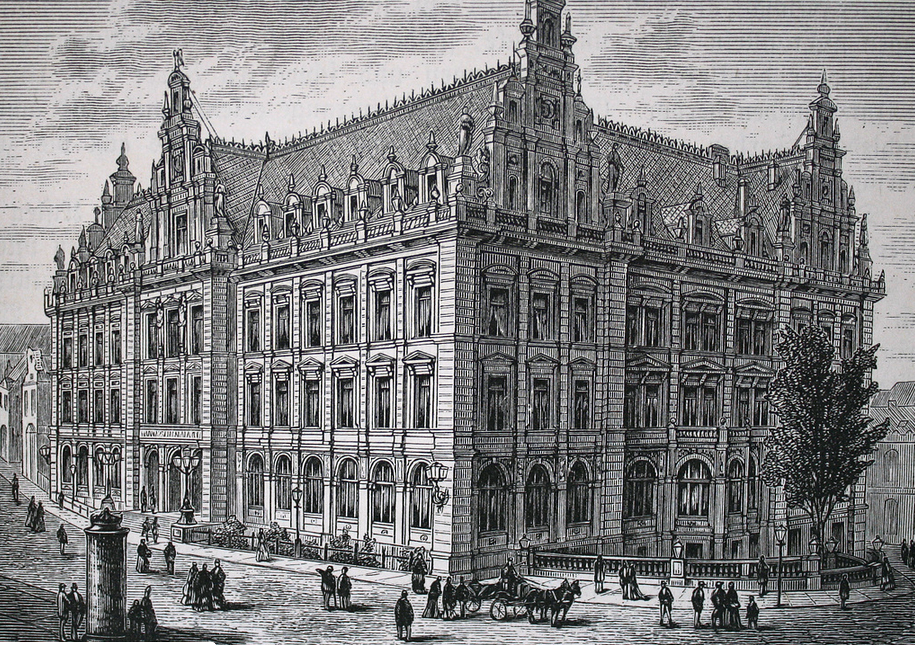
Reichspost in Bremen in 19th century

The four-winged building in the old town of Bremen was designed by Carl Schwatlo, a Berlin architect now known for his post office work, and constructed under the supervision of Ernst Hake from Stargard. It was completed in 1878. The project followed the establishment of the Deutsche Reichspost as a national monopoly in 1871. An area of land on the Domsheide was made available by the Bremen senate on the site of the former Eschenhof, once the residence of Alexander Erskein, who was the Swedish "president", in modern terms governor, of the Duchy of Bremen (previous Archbishopric of Bremen). The building was built in the Neo-Renaissance style of the times, with all the sophistications of a Central Imperial Post Office (Kaiserliche Oberpostdirektion). The sections overlooking the Domsheide were three storeys high while those on the lower Dechanatstraße had four storeys. Until 1896, the building enclosed a large courtyard. The interior was decorated with paintings by Arthur Fitger.

The Neo-Renaissance building housed the telegraph department and the main post office while the second floor held the grand rooms required by the director of the post office, not just his residential quarters but also a large banqueting hall in the centre of the avant-corps. While fine apartments in such buildings were common, the banqueting hall was unusual and may have resulted from the city's desire to excel in its first really prestigious building. Arthur Fitger depicted nymphs and centaurs in the arches and the director's apartment was in line with his high status within the German Empire.

During the 1970s, the building was extensively redesigned to meet the needs of the German Federal Post Office.

Since 2006, the building has been used by the St John Catholic School but the more prestigious Emperor's Hall with its murals by Fitger are sometimes open to the public. The building's history is summarised with a plaque on the wall which includes a QRpedia code that links to this article. Last not least, the post office in the ground flour has not been closed, it is still one of the busiest in Bremen.

== Literature ==
- Dehio, Georg (1992). Handbuch der deutschen Kunstdenkmäler: Bremen Niedersachsen. Deutscher Kunstverlag. ISBN 978-3-422-03022-0.
