= Willibald Beyschlag =

German theologian (1823–1900)

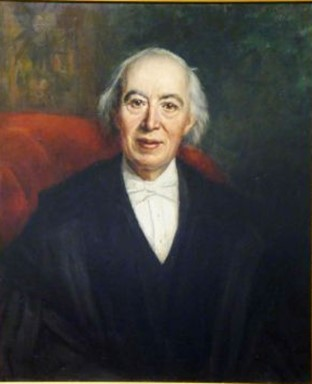
- Willibald Beyschlag; posthumous portrait by Susanne von Nathusius
- Born: Johann Heinrich Christoph Willibald Beyschlag; 5 September 1823; Frankfurt am Main
- Died: 5 September 1923 (aged 22); Halle an der Saale
- Education: University of Bonn; University of Berlin
- Occupation: Theologian

Johann Heinrich Christoph Willibald Beyschlag (5 September 1823 – 25 November 1900) was a German Protestant theologian.

== Biography ==
He studied theology at the Universities of Bonn and Berlin, afterwards serving as an assistant pastor in Koblenz (1849), then as a pastor in Trier (1850). During the following year, Beyschlag began working as a religious instructor in Mainz. In 1856 he became a court preacher in Karlsruhe, and four years later, he was appointed a professor of practical theology and New Testament exegesis at the University of Halle.

Beyschlag was the leader of the Kirchenpartei called Mittelpartei ("Middle Party"), and in 1876, with Albrecht Wolters, founded the Deutsch-evangelische Blätter (a publication of the Mittelpartei in the Kirche der Altpreußischen Union). Because of the combative nature of the magazine, he was once sued for libel. Also, he was a primary catalyst in the founding of the Evangelischer Bund (Protestant Confederation).

He was a leading supporter of the Vermittlungstheologie and was opposed to Chalcedonian Christology. Also, he stood for the rights of the laity, and believed in the autonomy of the church, leading him to be in favor of separation of church and state. Beyschlag was viewed as an antagonist of the Roman Catholic Church and a sharp critic of Ultramontanism.

== Selected works ==
In 1891 he published Neutestamentliche Theologie, oder, geschichtliche Darstellung der lehren Jesu und des Urchristenthums nach den neutestamentlichen Quellen, a book that was later translated into English and published as "New Testament theology; or, Historical account of the teaching of Jesus and of primitive Christianity according to the New Testament sources" (translation by Rev. Neil Buchanan; 1895). The following are a few of his many other writings:

- Die Christologie des Neuen Testaments : ein biblisch-theologischer Versuch, 1866 – Christology of the New Testament.
- Godofred, ein Märchen fürs deutsche Haus, 1890 – Godofred. A fairytale for German households.
- Das Leben Jesu, 1887 – The life of Jesus.
- Bischof D. Reinkens und der deutsche Altkatholizismus, 1896 – Bishop Joseph Hubert Reinkens and German Old Catholicism.
- Deutschland im Laufe des neunzehnten Jahrhunderts, 1900 – Germany during the nineteenth century.
