= Karl Friederichs =

German classical archaeologist

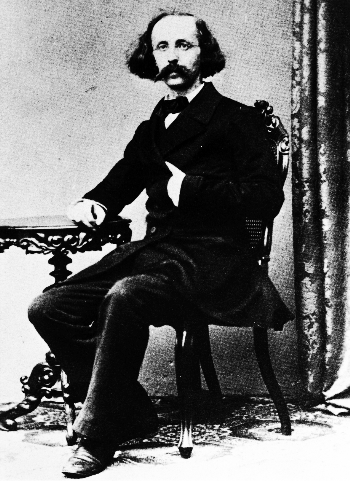
Karl Friederichs (1831–1871)

Karl Friederichs (7 April 1831 in Delmenhorst – 18 October 1871 in Berlin) was a German classical philologist and archaeologist.

He studied philology at the universities of Göttingen and Erlangen, where he was influenced by Carl Friedrich Nagelsbach. In 1853 he obtained his PhD with a dissertation on the Greek chorus in the works of Euripides and Sophocles, Chorus Euripideus comparatus cum Sophocleo. In 1858 he became an associate professor of archeology at the University of Berlin.

In 1868 he was named director of the Antiquarium in Berlin, and during the following year, travelled to Cyprus in order to procure antiquities on behalf of the museum. Beginning in October 1869, he took an extended trip to Palestine, Egypt, Greece, Sardinia, Sicily and Italy.

== Selected works ==
- Praxiteles und die Niobegruppe, nebst Erklärung einiger Vasenbilder, 1855 – Praxiteles and the "Niobe group", along with an explanation of some vase paintings.
- Pindarische Studien, 1863 – Pindaric studies.
- Kunst und Leben. Reisebriefe aus Griechenland, dem Orient und Italien, 1872 - Art and life; Letters from a journey to Greece, the Orient and Italy.
- Contributions to the 8 volume "Geschichte der bildenden Künste" (1866–1879); primary author Karl Schnaase.
- Was the author of a complete description of the Berlin Museum of Casts (1868; edition 2, 1885).
- Published in English: "Greek sculpture : selections from Friederichs' Bausteine"; translated by D. Cady Eaton, New Haven : Tuttle, Morehouse & Taylor, 1881-83. (5 volumes):
  - pt. 1. Archaic and imitative-archaic art.
  - pt. 2-3. Period of the highest development.
  - pt. 4. Period of the decline of Greek art.
  - pt. 5. Greek-Roman art.
