= Fritz Stuckenberg =

German painter

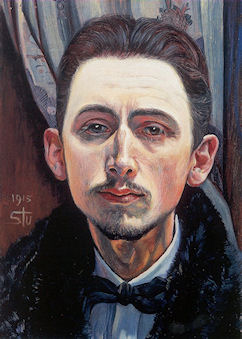
Fritz Stuckenberg (self-portrait; 1915)

Fritz Stuckenberg (16 August 1881 – 18 May 1944) was a German expressionist painter.

== Biography ==
He was born Friedrich Bernhard Stuckenberg in Munich, but moved with his family in 1893 to the northern industrial city of Delmenhorst (near Bremen), where his father took over as director of the Hansa-Linoleumwerke. After unfinished studies of architecture and art studies in Weimar and Munich, he spent five formative years (1907–1913) in Paris. From there he made excursions to Pont-Aven as well as to Provence (Cassis, Martigues) where he "cleaned his palette". He belonged to the circle of artists in the "Café Du Dôme" and exhibited in some of the best salons and galleries in Paris.

Coming back to Germany, he took residence in Berlin, where he was discovered in 1916 by Herwarth Walden and integrated into the Sturm circle. He became friends with Georg Muche, Arnold Topp, Walter Mehring and Mynona. Disillusioned with Walden, he joined in 1919 the Arbeitsrat für Kunst around Walter Gropius and Bruno Taut, later the Novembergruppe. Several "Sturm"-exhibitions, participation in the first Berlin Dadaist exhibition, and inclusion in the third Bauhaus portfolio, mark his rank in the artists' scene of these years. In the early 1920s, his works were shown in Germany, the USA and the Soviet Union as that of a pioneer of the European avant-garde.

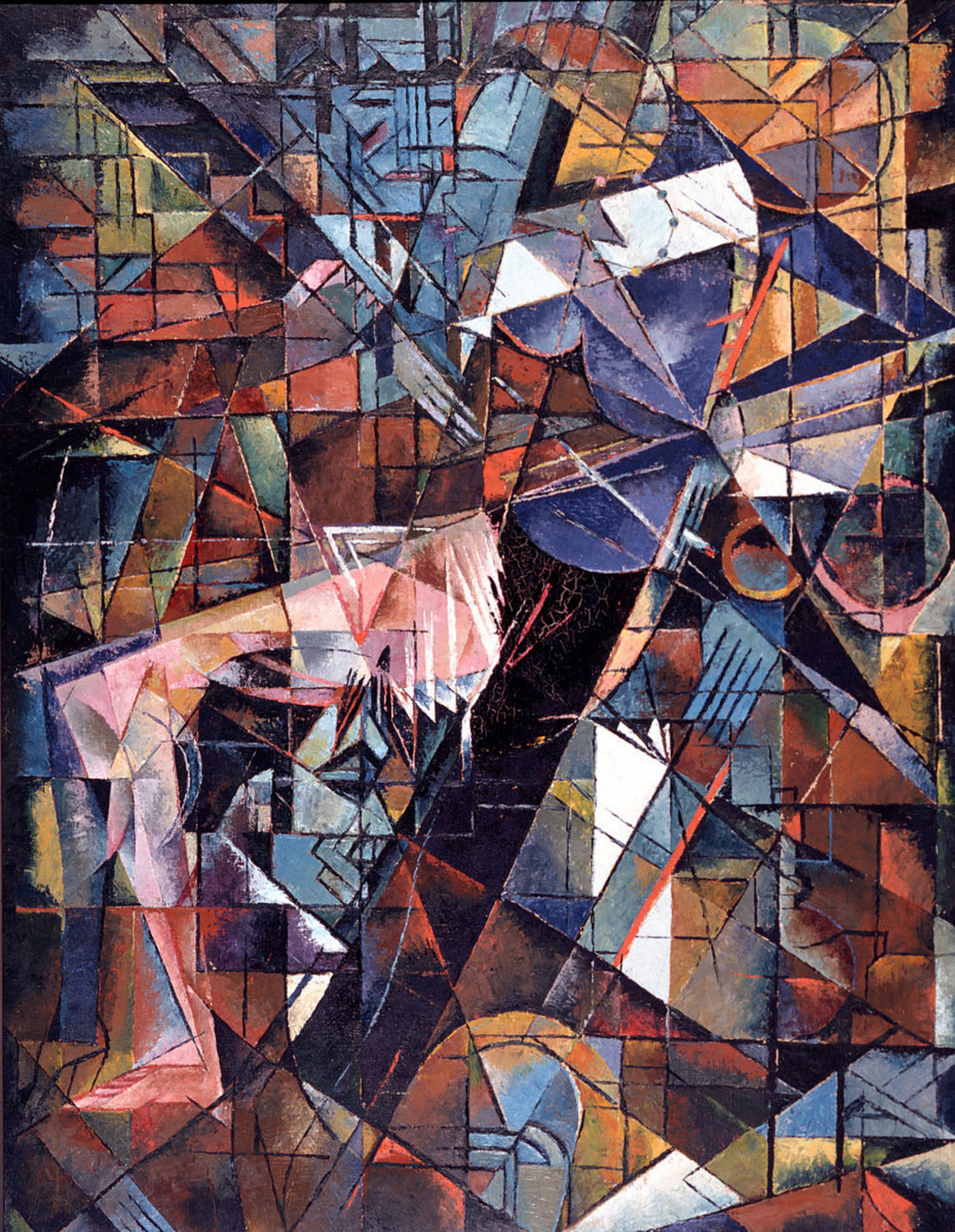
Das Liebespaar (1919)

Severe illness and financial problems forced Stuckenberg nevertheless to return to his parents in "gloomy Delmenhorst" (as he writes in a letter to the Flemish dadaist Paul van Ostaijen). Under increasingly difficult conditions, both political and personal, he developed a constructivist and spiritualist late work. All of his pictures were removed from German museums (and some of them destroyed) during the Nazi purges. In the infamous exhibition on "Entartete Kunst" in 1937, his Straße mit Häusern (street with houses, 1921) was exhibited as an example of "degenerate art". During the Second World War he moved to the South of Germany and died there in Füssen, already almost forgotten. In 1993 he was rediscovered as a part of the modern art avant-garde with a retrospective in Delmenhorst, Berlin and Neuss. A large part of his surviving work is now to be seen in the Städtische Galerie Delmenhorst.

== Sources ==
- Andrea Wandschneider, Barbara Alms (eds.): Fritz Stuckenberg 1881–1944: Retrospektive, Berlin: Argon 1993. ISBN 978-3-87024-240-4
- Barbara Alms (ed.): Fritz Stuckenberg. Vertrauter der Farben (exhibition catalogue), Bremen: Hauschild 1998. ISBN 978-3-931785-74-1
- Barbara Alms (ed.): Paris leuchtet. Bremen: Hachmannedition 2007. ISBN 978-3-939429-28-9
