= List of people from Bremen =

This article provides a list of notable people from the city of Bremen. Bremen is a Hanseatic city in northwestern Germany, which belongs to the Free Hanseatic City of Bremen (also called just "Bremen" for short), a federal state of Germany.

== Early times to 1800 ==
- Adam of Bremen (fl. 1066), author of chronicles and histories of Germany and Scandinavia.
- Johann Rode von Wale (c.1445–1511), Catholic cleric; Doctor of Canon and Civil Law; chronicler; long-serving government official (1468–1497); as John III, was Prince-Archbishop of Bremen, 1497–1511
- Arnoldus Clapmarius (1574–1604), German academic, jurist, humanist, known for his writings on statecraft
- Johannes Cocceius (1603–1669), Dutch theologian born in Bremen.
- Frans Banninck Cocq (1605–1655), Mayor of Amsterdam, central figure in Rembrandt's masterpiece The Night Watch
- Riksfriherre Sir Johan Fredrik von Friesendorff, 1st Baronet (1617–1669), Swedish diplomat born in Bremen
- Henry Oldenburg (1619–1677), secretary of the Royal Society
- Franz Wulfhagen (c. 1624–1670), German Baroque painter and engraver
- Ulrik Frederik Gyldenløve, Count of Laurvig (1638–1704), general in Norway during the Scanian War; illegitimate son of King Frederick III of Denmark and Norway
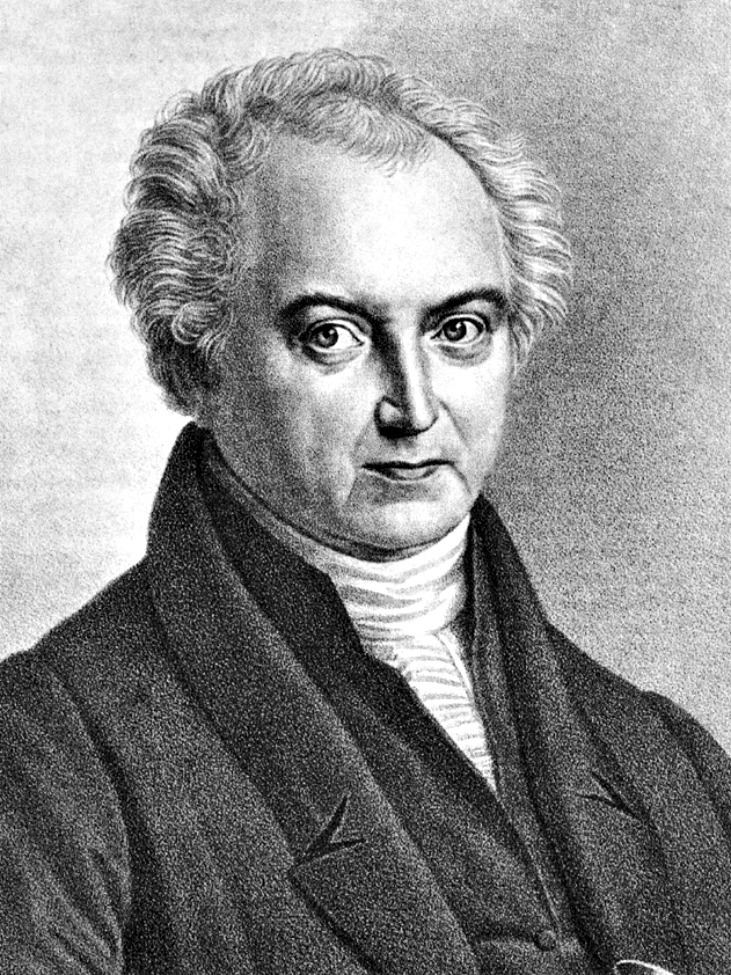
- Wilhelm Olbers 1758–1840
  Heinrich von Cocceji (1644–1719), professor of natural and international law at the Heidelberg University
- Joachim Neander (1650–1680), rector, pastor, hymn writer.
- Johann Baring (1697–1748), name later anglicised to John Baring, German-British merchant; founder of Barings Bank
- Hermanus Meyer (1733–1791), clergyman of the Dutch Reformed Church in America
- Johann Peter Berg (1737–1800), German Protestant theologian, historian and orientalist
- Wilhelm Olbers (1758–1840), physician and astronomer.
- Blasius Merrem (1761–1824), naturalist, zoologist, ornithologist, mathematician, and herpetologist
- Albertus Henricus Wiese (1761–1810), Governor-General of the Dutch East Indies, 1805–1808
- Gerhard Ludvig Lahde (1765–1833), Prussian-born Danish printmaker and publisher
- Gottfried Reinhold Treviranus (1776–1837), naturalist and botanist, discovered the intercellular space in a plant's parenchyma.
- Betty Gleim (1781-1827), German teacher, school founder and author
- Hermann Ernst Freund (1786–1840), German-born Danish sculptor of figures from Nordic mythology

== 1800 to 1850 ==
- Hermann Heinrich Winter (1805–1884), farmer, local official, member of Wisconsin State Assembly
- Johann Georg Kohl (1808–1878), travel writer, historian, geographer and librarian

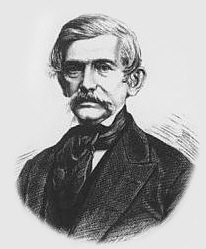
Johann Georg Kohl 1808–1878

- Friedrich Wagenfeld (1810–1846), German philologist and author
- Henry Bohlen (1810–1862), American Civil War Union Brigadier General
- Carl Johann Steinhäuser (1813–1879), German sculptor in the classical style
- Nicolaus Delius (1813–1888), German philologist and student of Shakespeare.
- Gustav Hartlaub (1814–1900), German physician and ornithologist
- Johann Heinrich Wilhelm Henzen (1816–1887), German philologist and epigraphist
- Julie Schwabe (1818–1896), socialite, education activist and philanthropist, lived in Manchester, UK
- Carl Wilhelm von Zehender (1819–1916), ophthalmologist, pioneer of ophthalmic microsurgery
- Wilhelm Paul Corssen (1820–1875), German philologist; worked on Latin and Etruscan topics.
- Frederick L. Schmersahl (1825-c.1905), German-American merchant and eleventh Mayor of Hoboken, New Jersey
- Adolf Bastian (1826–1905), polymath ethnography and anthropologist.
- Charles Henry Nimitz (1826–1911), in 1852 built the Nimitz Hotel in Fredericksburg, Texas
- Amalie Murtfeldt (1828-1888), German painter
- Arnold Huchting (1828–1901), member of the Wisconsin State Assembly
- Frederick Halterman (1831-1907), U.S. Congressman
- Friedrich Gerhard Rohlfs (1831–1896), geographer, explorer, author and adventurer.
- Henry Timken (1831–1909), inventor, founded the Timken Roller Bearing Company
- Hermann Ottomar Herzog (1832–1932), European and American artist of landscapes, from the Düsseldorf school of painting
- August Wilmanns (1833–1917), classical scholar and librarian

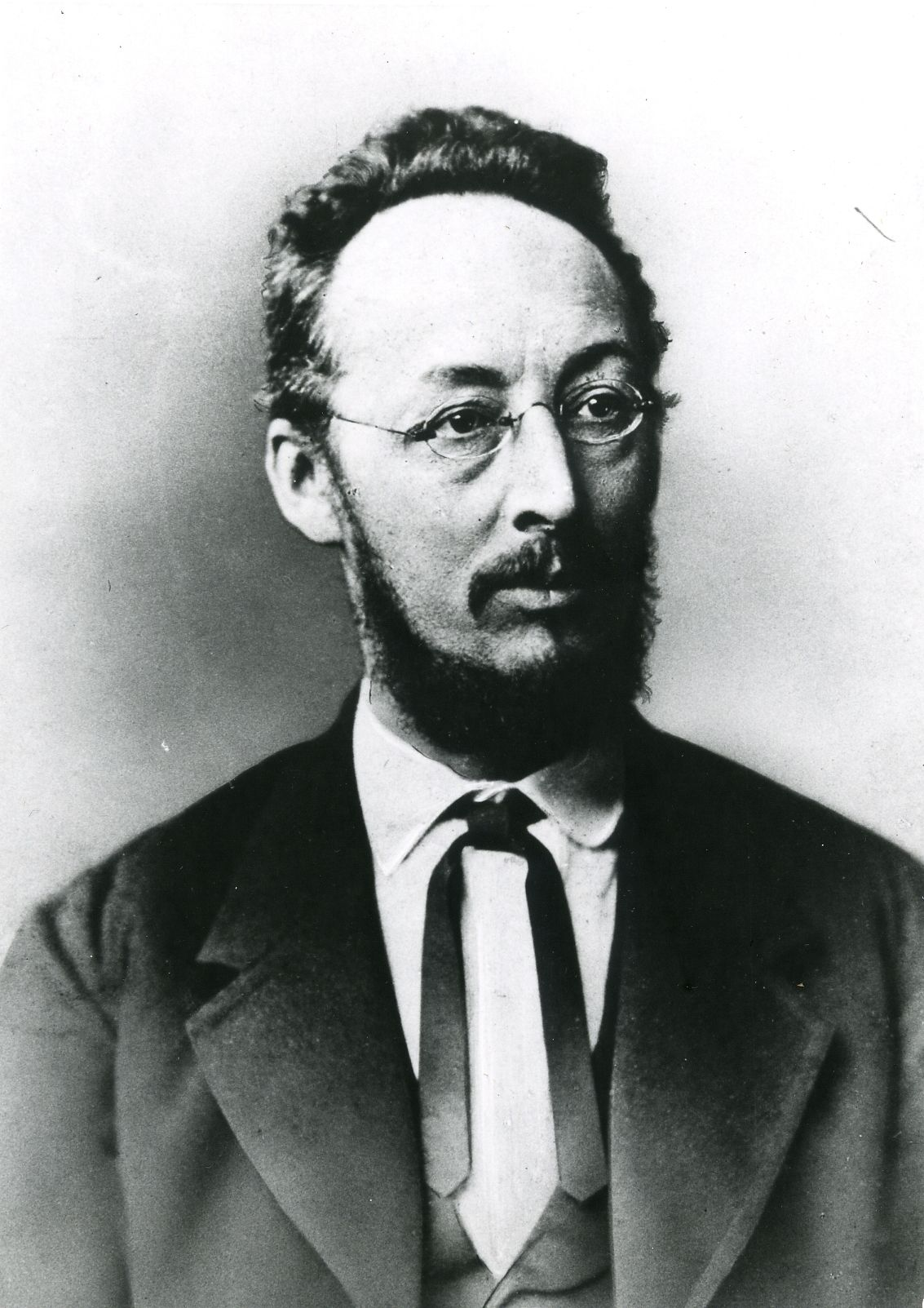
August Wilmanns 1833–1917

- Franz Adolf Eduard Lüderitz (1834–1886), merchant and colonist in South West Africa.
- Johann Georg Poppe (1837–1915), prominent architect during the German Gründerzeit and interior designer of ocean liners for Norddeutscher Lloyd
- Frederick C. Winkler (1838–1921), American Civil War Union brigadier general
- John Henry Niemeyer (1839–1932), German-born painter, taught drawing at Yale University
- Heinrich Averbeck (1844–1889), physiotherapist

== 1850 to 1900 ==
- Hermann Ebbinghaus (1850–1909), German psychologist, studied memory, discovered the forgetting curve and the spacing effect
- Sir Hermann Gollancz (1852–1930), British rabbi and Hebrew scholar
- Johann Heinrich Burchard (1852–1912), Hamburg lawyer, politician, senator, First Mayor of Hamburg
- August Kühne (1855–1932), German businessman, co-founder in 1890 of Kuehne + Nagel
- Heinrich Wiegand (1855-1909), German lawyer and general director of the Norddeutscher Lloyd shipping company
- Carl David Tolmé Runge (1856–1927), German mathematician, physicist, and spectroscopist
- Adolph Fischer (1858–1887), an anarchist and labor union activist, tried and executed in the US after the Haymarket Riot
- Ludwig Quidde (1858–1941), pacifist politician and Nobel Peace Prize laureate 1927
- Ludwig Hermann Plate (1862–1937), German zoologist and disciple of Ernst Haeckel
- Theodor Siebs (1862–1941), German linguist, author of Deutsche Bühnenaussprache in 1898
- Johann Gerhard Husheer (1864–1954), New Zealand tobacco grower, industrialist and philanthropist
- Heinrich Bulle (1867–1945), German archaeologist
- Wilhelm Vöge (1868–1952), German art historian, discovered the Reichenau School of painting, important medievalist
- Karl Hampe (1869–1936), German historian of the High Middle Ages
- Wilhelm Klatte (1870-1930), German music theoretician, pedagogue, journalist and conductor
- Heinrich Vogeler (1872–1942), German painter, Düsseldorf school of painting, designer and architect
- Friedrich August Georg Bitter (1873–1927), German botanist and lichenologist
- Edward Voigt (1873–1934), emigrated 1883, U.S. Representative from Wisconsin
- Ludwig Roselius (1874–1943), patron of the arts, coffee merchant and founder of KAFFEE HAG
- Edward Ernst Kleinschmidt (1876–1977), prolific inventor; one of the inventors of the teleprinter
- Karl Abraham (1877–1925), German psychoanalyst, collaborator of Sigmund Freud
- Heinrich Georg Barkhausen (1881–1956), German physicist, discovered the Barkhausen effect in 1919
- Karl Alfred Pabst (1884–1971), painter, graphic artist and lithographer, worked and died at Bremen
- Hans Dreier (1885–1966), film art director
- Herbert von Böckmann (1886–1974), German general of the infantry
- Grover Cleveland Loening (1888–1976), American aircraft manufacturer
- Henrich Focke (1890–1979), German aviation pioneer, co-founder of Focke-Wulf
- Bernhard Hans Henry Scharoun (1893–1972), German architect, designed the Berlin Philharmonic concert hall, exponent of organic and expressionist architecture
- Lieutenant Friedrich Theodor Noltenius (1894–1936), German flying ace in the First World War
- Friedrich Ebert Jr. (1894–1979), Reichstag deputy (SPD), SED politician, Lord Mayor of East Berlin (1948–1967)
- Friedrich Forster (1895–1958), pseudonym for Waldfried Burggraf, dramatist and screenwriter
- Emil Trinkler (1896–1931), Central Asian geographer and explorer
- Eberhard Gildemeister (1897–1978), German architect, designed the Sparkasse building on Bremen's market square
- Georg Kulenkampff (1898–1948), violinist

== 1900 to 1950 ==
- Ada Halenza (1900–1990), writer
- Wilhelm Wagenfeld (1900–1990), industrial designer
- Georg Ferdinand Duckwitz (1904–1973), German diplomat, contributed to the rescue of 7000 Danish Jews
- Hans Biebow (1902–1947), chief of Nazi administration of the Łódź Ghetto executed for war crimes
- Alexander Piorkowski (1904–1948), Nazi commandant of Dachau concentration camp
- Harald Damsleth (1906–1971), Norwegian cartoonist, illustrator, ad-man, known for his WW2 posters for Nasjonal Samling
- Harald Genzmer (1909–2007), composer of contemporary classical music
- Hanna Kunath (1909–1994), pilot
- Gerda Krüger-Nieland (1910–2000), lawyer and judge
- Bernard Adolph Schriever (1910–2005), also known as Bennie Schriever, United States Air Force general
- Heinz Linge (1913–1980), SS officer; served as a valet for German dictator Adolf Hitler
- Reinhard Hardegen (1913–2018), Member of Bremen Parliament and former U-boat commander of submarine U-123
- Karl Carstens (1914–1992), German politician (CDU), former President of the Federal Republic of Germany

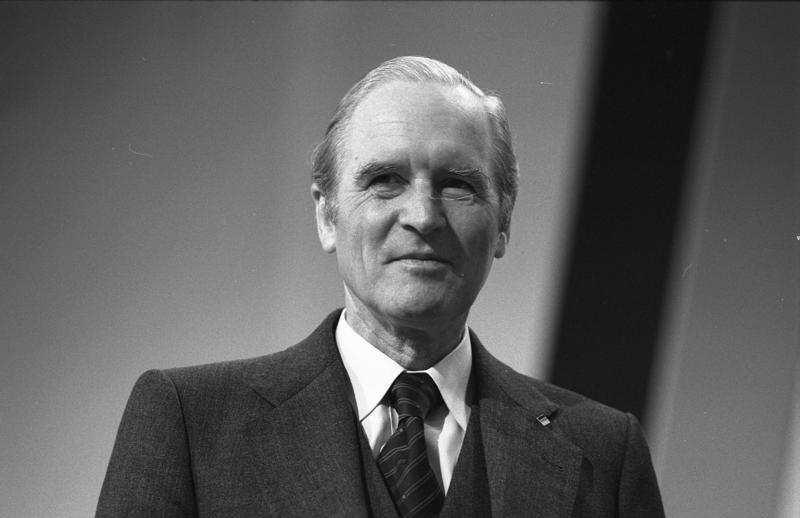
Karl Carstens 1914–1992

- Hermann Uhde (1914–1965), Wagnerian baritone, died on stage of a heart attack during a performance in Copenhagen
- Gustav Böhrnsen (1914–1998), politician, trade unionist and resistance fighter
- Karl-Heinz Höcker (1915–1998), German theoretical nuclear physicist; worked on the German nuclear weapon project
- Friedrich Thielen (1916–1993), German politician with the CDU and the German Party
- Herbert Vighnāntaka Günther (1917–2006), German Buddhist philosopher and Professor of Far Eastern Studies at the University of Saskatchewan
- Cato Bontjes van Beek (1920–1943), German member of the German resistance to Nazism, guillotined Plötzensee Prison
- Hans-Joachim Kulenkampff (1921–1998), actor, quizmaster, German actor and TV host
- Doris Kuhlmann-Wilsdorf (1922–2010), German metallurgist
- Bert Trautmann (1923-2013), German professional footballer played as a goalkeeper and first German to be a FA Cup Winner
- Robert Last (1923–1986), German drummer and bandleader
- Sir Selwyn Charles Cornelius-Wheeler CMG (1923–2008), known as Charles Wheeler, British journalist and BBC broadcaster
- Hilmar Hoffmann (1925–2018), founder of Oberhausen film festival, cultural politician in Frankfurt, director of Goethe-Institut
- Kai Warner (1926–1982), German bandleader and musician, brother of James Last and Robert Last
- Hans Otte (1926–2007), composer
- Hans-Joachim Bremermann (1926–1996), German-American mathematician and biophysicist, wrote Bremermann's limit
- Günter Meisner (1926–1994), German TV and film character actor
- James Last (1929–2015), composer and big band leader
- Claus Peymann (1937–2025), theatre director and manager
- Hans-Christof von Sponeck (born 1939), German diplomat, served as a UN Assistant Secretary-General and UN Humanitarian Coordinator for Iraq
- Luise Kimme (1939–2013), German artist, sculptor and professor at the Kunstakademie Düsseldorf
- Volker Spengler (1939–2020), German actor
- Hans Wilhelm (born 1945), German-American writer, children's book author, illustrator and artist
- Uwe Windhorst (born 1946), German neuroscientist, systems scientist and cyberneticist
- Christina Kubisch (born 1948), German composer, performance artist, professor and flautist

== 1950 to modern times ==
- Barbara Sukowa (born 1950), German theatre and film actress
- Juergen Nogai (born 1953), architectural photographer and filmmaker
- Jürgen Trittin (born 1954), German Green politician, Federal Minister for the Environment, Nature Conservation and Nuclear Safety, 1998–2005
- Klaus Kleinfeld (born 1957), former CEO of Siemens AG
- Piet Klocke (born 1957), musician, cabaret artist, author and actor
- Gert Postel (born 1958), medical impostor
- Bernhard Siegert (born 1959), German media theorist and media historian
- Barbara Massing (1960–2017), female sea captain
- Sven Regener (born 1961), musician and writer
- Falko E. P. Wilms (born 1961), economist and social scientist
- Torsten Albig (born 1963), politician (SPD)
- Martin Blessing (born 1963), German banker, Chairman of Commerzbank AG
- Bärbel Schäfer (born 1963), television presenter and wife of Michel Friedman
- Barbara Stühlmeyer (born 1964), German musicologist, church musician, writer and scholar of Hildegard of Bingen
- Kersten Artus (born 1964), German journalist, politician; member of The Left; member of the Hamburg Parliament
- Ben Becker (born 1964), German actor, brother of Meret Becker
- Maren Niemeyer (born 1964), journalist, author, and documentary filmmaker
- Piet Leidreiter (born 1965), politician
- Meret Becker (born 1969), German actor, sister of Ben Becker
- Esther Haase (born 1966), German photographer and film director, lives in Hamburg and London
- Claudia Garde (born 1966), German film director and screenwriter
- André Erkau (born 1968), film director and screenplay writer
- Stephan Bodzin (born 1969), German DJ, techno-producer, label owner and live artist
- Claudio Martínez Mehner (born 1970), Spanish piano soloist and pedagogue
- Julia Hasting (born 1970), German graphic designer, creative director of Phaidon Press
- Friedemann Friese (born 1970), designer of Power Grid and other board games
- Martin Welzel (born 1972), German organist, musicologist, and music educator; former student of Käte van Tricht (Organist at Bremen Cathedral), associate organist at Munich Cathedral 2021-2022
- Bas Böttcher (born 1974), a German slam poet and visiting lecturer at the German Literature Institute in Leipzig
- Marco Da Silva (born 1977), Portuguese dancer and choreographer
- Sebastian Lege (born 1978), German chef and TV personality
- Nils Mönkemeyer (born 1978), German violist and academic teacher, teaches at the Musikhochschule Munich
- Jan Böhmermann (born 1981), German satirist and television presenter
- Murat Kurnaz (born 1982), Guantanamo Bay prisoner for four years
- Anna-Lena Schwing (born 1996), German actress
- Michael Kölling, German Computer Scientist and creator of BlueJ

== Sportspeople ==
- Uwe Behrens (born 1959), footballer
- Terrence Boyd (born 1991), footballer
- Julian Brandt (born 1996), footballer
- Birgit Dressel (1960–1987), heptathlon athlete
- Angelique Kerber (born 1988), German professional tennis player
- Louis Krages (1949–2001), racing driver and businessman
- Selma Ličina, (born 2001), footballer
- Simon Lizotte (born 1992), professional disc golf player, PDGA# 8332
- Jonathan Schmude (born 1992), footballer
- Bert Trautmann (1923–2013), footballer
- Florian Wellbrock (born 1997), swimmer
- Nick Woltemade (born 2002), footballer

== See also ==
- List of mayors of Bremen
