= German Party =

German Party may refer to:

- German-Hanoverian Party, a regionalist party based in the old Kingdom of Hanover
- German Party (1947), a regionalist and conservative political party and governing coalition party
- German Party (1961), a minor defunct German conservative party
- German Party (1993), a small right wing party active in Germany
- German Party (Romania)
- German Party (Slovakia)
- German Party (Yugoslavia)
- German Party of the Zips, a party of the First Czechoslovak Republic founded 1920

== See also ==
- List of political parties in Germany
