= Johann Georg Kohl =

German travel writer, historian, and geographer

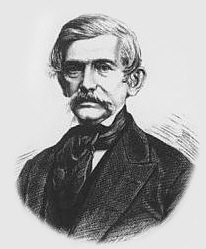
- Born: 28 April 1808; Bremen, Germany
- Died: 28 October 1878 (aged 70)
- Occupations: travel writer, historian

Johann Georg Kohl (28 April 1808 – 28 October 1878) was a German travel writer, historian, and geographer.

== Life ==
Son of a wine merchant, he attended a Gymnasium in Bremen, and then studied law at the University of Göttingen, Heidelberg University, and the Ludwig-Maximilians-Universität München. When his father died in 1830, he had to break off his studies, and he spent six years working as a tutor in Courland. He then traveled to St. Petersburg and other parts of Russia. In 1838, he returned to Germany and settled in Dresden, from where he visited much of Europe and wrote about his experiences.

== Future theories ==
Kohl's main scholarly work, Der Verkehr und die Ansiedlungen der Menschen in ihrer Abhängigkeit von der Gestalt der Erdoberfläche (Transportation and Settlement of People and Their Dependence on Surface Terrain) (1841, 1850) is regarded as the founding text of modern transport and urban geography. Using Moscow as an example, he formulated a mathematical theory for the development of spherical cities, and described how eventually these cities would develop skyscrapers and underground shopping centers. His Die geographische Lage der Hauptstädte Europas (The Geographical Location of the Capitals of Europe) (1874) was also fundamental to theoretical geography.

== Travels in the British Isles ==
Kohl's record of his 1842 journey to Ireland and the English port of Liverpool provides important insights into the condition of both locations before both were beset by the disaster of the Great Famine.

In 1842, Kohl also visited Birmingham and York. He wrote a lengthy description of the Minster and York's Quaker community.

== Travels in America ==
From 1854 to 1858, he traveled in the United States. He prepared some valuable maps for the U.S. government, and at the request of the United States Coast Survey he prepared two reports: History of the Discovery of the U. S. Coast and History and Investigation of the Gulf Stream (Bremen, 1868). In Washington and at Harvard, Kohl made friends with many writers including Henry Wadsworth Longfellow, Ralph Waldo Emerson and Washington Irving, and scholars including George Bancroft, Charles Bennett Deane and Louis Agassiz. Kohl's book Reisen in Canada und durch die Staaten von New York und Pennsylvanien (Travels in Canada and Through the States of New York and Pennsylvania; 1856) is still consulted by historians of Pennsylvania Dutch. On his return to Europe, he settled in Bremen, where he was appointed city librarian in 1863.

== Bibliography ==
- 1841: Travels in the Interior of Russia and Poland
- 1841: Der Verkehr und die Ansiedlungen der Menschen in ihrer Abhjängigkeit von der Gestaltung der Erdoberfläche, Dresden.
- 1842–1846: Reiseberichte über Österreich, das bayrische Hochland, Dänemark und Großbritannien.
- 1844: De Ukraine en Klein-Rusland
- 1844: The British Isles and Their Inhabitants
- 1845: Johann Georg Kohl and Ida Kohl: Englische Skizzen (in 3 acts), Leipzig and Dresden.
- 1846: Reise durch Dänemark und die Herzogthümer Schleswig und Holstein (in 2 volumes), Leipzig.
- 1850–1852: Reiseberichte über die Niederlande, Istrien, Dalmatien und Montenegro und das südöstliche Deutschland.
- 1850: Aus meinen Hütten (in 2 volumes), Leipzig.
- 1851: Der Rhein (The Rhine; in 2 volumes), Leipzig.
- 1851: Skizzen aus Natur und Völkerleben (in 2 acts), Dresden.
- 1854: Die Donau (The Danube), Triest.
- 1856: Geschichte des Golfstroms und seiner Erforschung, Stuttgart.
- 1856: Reisen in Canada und durch die Staaten von New York und Pennsylvanien (Travels in Canada and through the states of New York and Pennsylvania), Stuttgart.
- 1857: Descriptive Catalogue of Maps Relating to America Mentioned in Hakluyt, Washington.
- 1858: Reisen im Nordwesten der Vereinigten Staaten (Travels in the Northwestern Parts of the United States), St. Louis.
- 1859: Kitschi Gami oder Erzählungen vom Oberen See (Kitchi Gami or stories from Lake Superior), Bremen.
- 1860: Die beiden ältesten generalkarten von Amerika 1527 und 1529, Weimar.
- 1861: Geschichte der Entdeckung Amerikas (History of the Discovery of America), Bremen.
- 1864: Nordwestdeutsche Skizzen, Bremen.
- 1866: Deutsche Volksbilder und Naturansichten aus dem Harz, Hannover.
- 1866: Am Wege, Blick in Gemüt und Welt, Bremen.
- 1869: Entdeckungsgeschichte der Küsten der Vereinigten Staaten
- 1869: A History of the Discovery of Maine
- 1870: Episoden aus der Kultur- und Kunstgeschichte Bremens, Bremen.
- 1874: Die geographische Lage der hauptstädte Europas, Leipzig.
- 1877: Geschichte der Entdeckungsfahrten und Schiffahrten zur Magalhaes-Straße, Berlin.

== Sources ==
- Herbert Schwarzwälder. Das Große Bremen-Lexikon. Edition Temmen, Bremen 2003, ISBN 3-86108-693-X
- Wilhelm Wolkenhauer (1882). "Kohl, Johann Georg" . Allgemeine Deutsche Biographie (in German). Vol. 16. Leipzig: Duncker & Humblot. pp. 425–428.
- Wilhelm Wolkenhauer. “Johann Georg Kohl” in Aus allen Weltteilen, X, pp. 138–141. (in German)
- Rines, George Edwin, ed. (1920). "Kohl, Johann Georg" . Encyclopedia Americana.
