= Karl Alfred Pabst =

German painter, graphic artist and lithographer

Karl Pabst
- Born: 2 December 1884; Leipzig, German Empire
- Died: 6 May 1971 (aged 86); Bremen, West Germany
- Occupation: artist
- Known for: painting, illustration, lithography

Karl Alfred Pabst (2 December 1884, Leipzig – 6 May 1971, Bremen) was a German painter, graphic artist and lithographer.

Pabst was a painter of atmospheric landscapes and cityscapes, and an illustrator for documents, maps and advertising.

Pabst was the son of a locksmith and toolmaker. Showing an early talent for drawing, he completed a lithographic apprenticeship and illustrated magazines. In 1902 he studied at the Academy of Fine Arts in Leipzig. Following this he moved to Munich, from where he undertook study trips. From 1914 to 1915 he worked as an art retoucher in Chemnitz. He was a soldier in the First World War, during which he married in 1916. In 1919 he settled in Bremen, where he worked as a draughtsman and lithographer, ran a stone-printing studio and was in charge of lithography at the printing house Hauschild Verlag. In 1924 and 1925 he managed the Kito-Packung AG packaging factory in Bremen-Vegesack; after its bankruptcy he managed the printing works of Bremer Druckerei AG. From 1926 to 1932 he was active as a freelance artist, then worked at the Bremen Land Survey Office. In 1954 he set up as a painter and graphic artist. His work is displayed in public buildings in Bremen.

== Literature ==
- "Praktische Perspektive" in The Folder (magazine) Callwey, Munich 1918
- Schwarzwälder, Herbert: Das Große Bremen-Lexikon. 2. updated, revised and extended edition. Edition Temmen, Bremen 2003, ISBN 3-86108-693-X
