= FHV =

FHV may refer to:

- Fair Haven (Amtrak station), in Vermont, United States
- Feline herpesvirus
- Vorarlberg University of Applied Sciences, (German: Fachhochschule Vorarlberg), in Austria
