= Schmude =

Schmude is a German surname. Notable people with the surname include:

- Jonathan Schmude (born 1992), German footballer
- Jürgen Schmude (1936–2025), German politician
