= Lege =

Lege may refer to:

== Places ==
- Legé, a commune in the Loire-Atlantique department in western France
- Lège, a commune in the Haute-Garonne department in southwestern France
- Lège, a village in the commune of Lège-Cap-Ferret in the Gironde department in southwestern France

== People ==
- Sebastian Lege, a German chef and TV personality

== Other uses ==
- lege, a colloquial term for legislature
