= Barbara Massing =

German sea captain

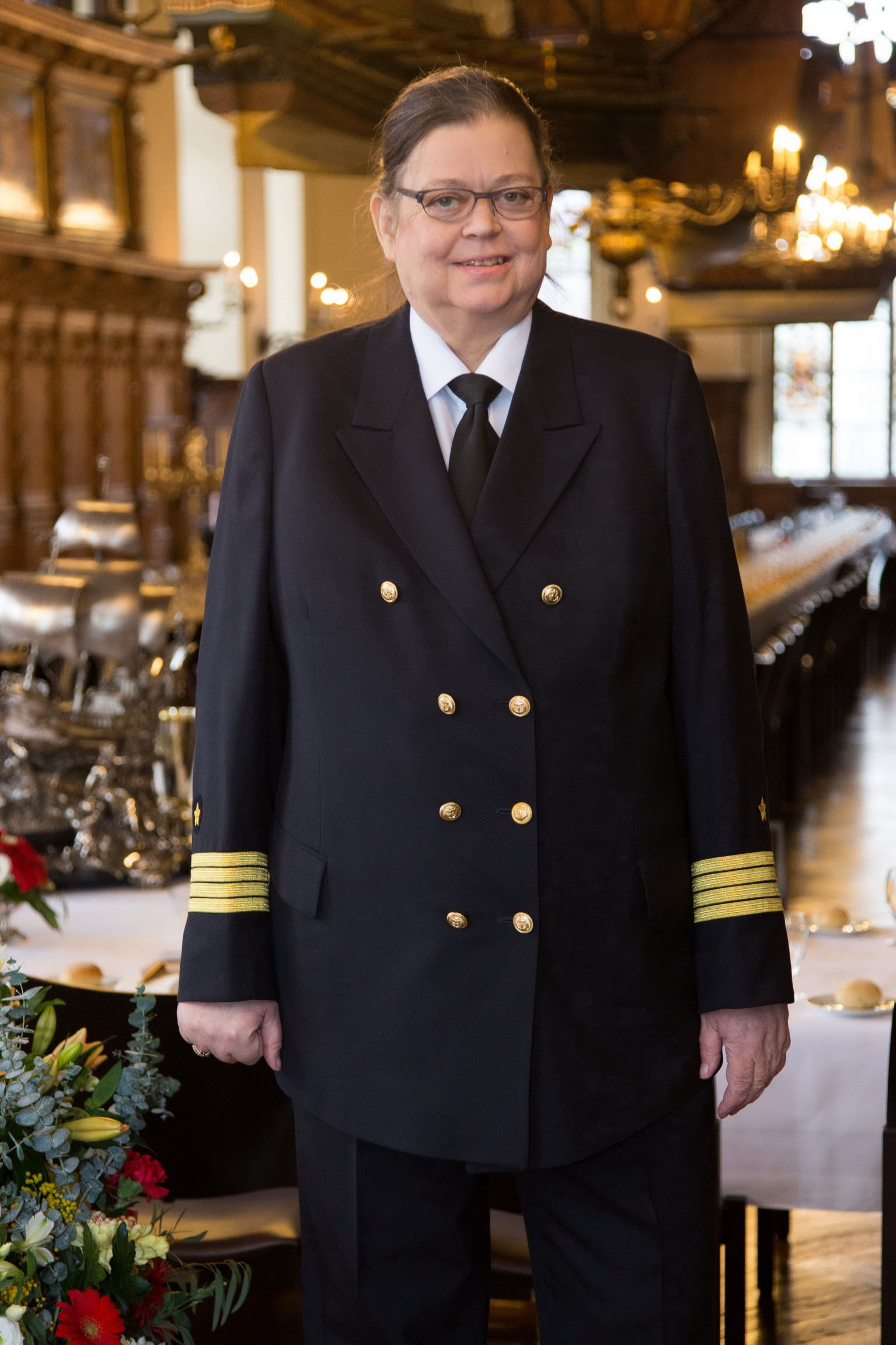
- Barbara Massing
- Born: 31 May 1960; Germany
- Died: 27 March 2017 (aged 56); Bremen, Germany
- Occupation: sea captain
- Known for: first woman to take part in Schaffermahlzeit

Barbara Massing ( 31 May 1960 – 27 March 2017) was a German sea captain. She sailed on fourth-generation container ships and was one of the very few female captains in the world during her time. Massing was a nautical member of the Haus Seefahrt in Bremen. In 2004, she became the first woman to take part in the traditional Bremen Schaffermahlzeit, an annual banquet where its history dates back to 1545.

== Life ==
Massing grew up with her two brothers and moved to Bremen in the mid-1960s with her family. She completed training as a sailor, which at that time was still a prerequisite for a nautical degree. Later she acquired her seaman's certificate from the shipping company Leonhardt & Blumberg. Massing studied from 1981 to 1984 at what was then the University of Nautical Sciences in Bremen and then went to sea as a second officer.

In 1989 she returned to work for the shipping company Leonhardt & Blumberg and in 1990 she took part in supply trips for Australian research stations in the Antarctic on the polar supply ship Icebird as its first officer. In 1994 Massing was the only German female captain of a container ship. In 2006 she was one of only six female German captains worldwide. Until her retirement, Massing sailed on fourth-generation Panamax container ships with Leonhardt & Blumberg. She was at sea for up to eight months each year.

After Massing became a captain, the statutes of the Stiftung Haus Seefahrt, a social welfare institution in Bremen that had existed since 1545 and supports the old seafaring members and their dependents were reviewed. Massing found that the acceptance of a woman with a captain's license is not regulated separately in the traditional statutes of the foundation and is therefore not excluded. In 1996 she was accepted as a seafaring member of Haus Seefahrt, making her the first woman in its centuries-old history. Then she first took part in 2004 as a regular guest at the Schaffermahlzeit, conducted annually by Haus Seefahrtis which is considered the oldest surviving, annual recurring brother's meal in the world. Massing's Massing's participation in the traditional event, which until then had only been attended by men was seen as a sensation and attracted national interest.

Massing was also an avid cyclist. In the 90s she crossed the Australian continent all alone on her vacation. She died on 27 March 2017 in Bremen.
