= Otto Binswanger =

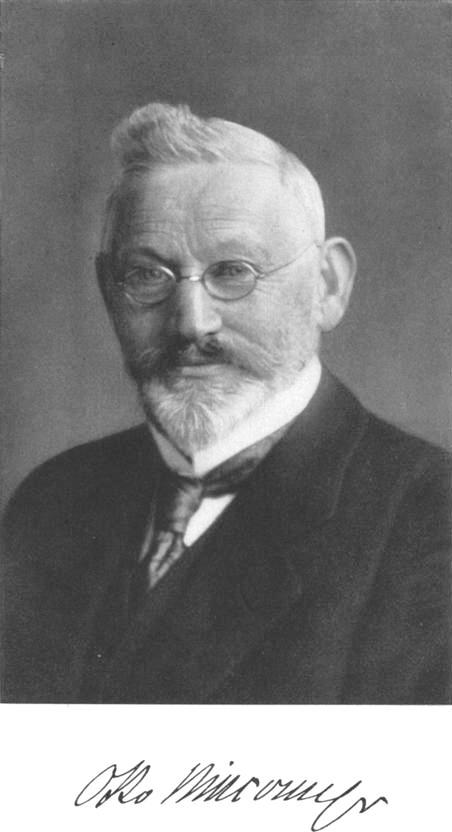
Otto Binswanger (1852-1929)

Otto Ludwig Binswanger (/ˈbɪnzwæŋər/; Swiss Standard German: [ˈbɪnsvaŋər]; 14 October 1852, Scherzingen, Münsterlingen – 15 July 1929, Kreuzlingen) was a Swiss psychiatrist and neurologist who came from a famous family of physicians; his father was founder of the Kreuzlingen Sanatorium, and he was uncle to Ludwig Binswanger (1881–1966) who was a major figure in the existential psychology movement. He was brother-in-law to physiotherapist Heinrich Averbeck (1844–1889). Other notable family members include his son-in-law Hans-Constantin Paulssen (1892-1984), who was the first president of the BDA (Bundesvereinigung der Deutschen Arbeitgeberverbände) (Confederation of German Employers' Associations).

== Biography ==
Otto studied medicine at Heidelberg, Strasbourg and Zurich, and beginning in 1877, worked under Ludwig Meyer (1827–1900) in the psychiatric clinic at the University of Göttingen. He was later associated with the pathological institute in Breslau, and in 1880 was appointed chief physician under Karl Friedrich Otto Westphal (1833–1890) in the psychiatric and neurological clinic at Charité Hospital in Berlin. From 1882 until 1919, he was a professor and director of psychology at the University of Jena. At Jena he worked with several young neurologists that included Theodor Ziehen (1862–1950), Oskar Vogt (1870–1959), Korbinian Brodmann (1868–1918), and Hans Berger (1873–1941). In 1911 he attained the title of rector at the university.

Binswanger wrote over 100 publications, most notably on epilepsy, neurasthenia and hysteria. Die Pathologie und Therapie der Neurasthenie (1896) was his major work on neurasthenia. His 1899 textbook on epilepsy (Die Epilepsie) became a standard in the profession. In his histopathological research he sought to explain similarities and differences between progressive paralysis and other types of organic brain disease. With neurologist Ernst Siemerling (1857-1931), he was co-author of an influential textbook on psychiatry titled Lehrbuch der Psychiatrie (1904).

In 1894 he described a condition he called "encephalitis subcorticalis chronica progressiva", which would later go by the name of "Binswanger's disease". This disease is defined as subcortical dementia characterized by loss of memory and intellectual faculties. One of his more famous patients was German philosopher Friedrich Nietzsche, others were the writers (later on) Hans Fallada and Johannes R. Becher.
