= Haus Seefahrt =

Foundation

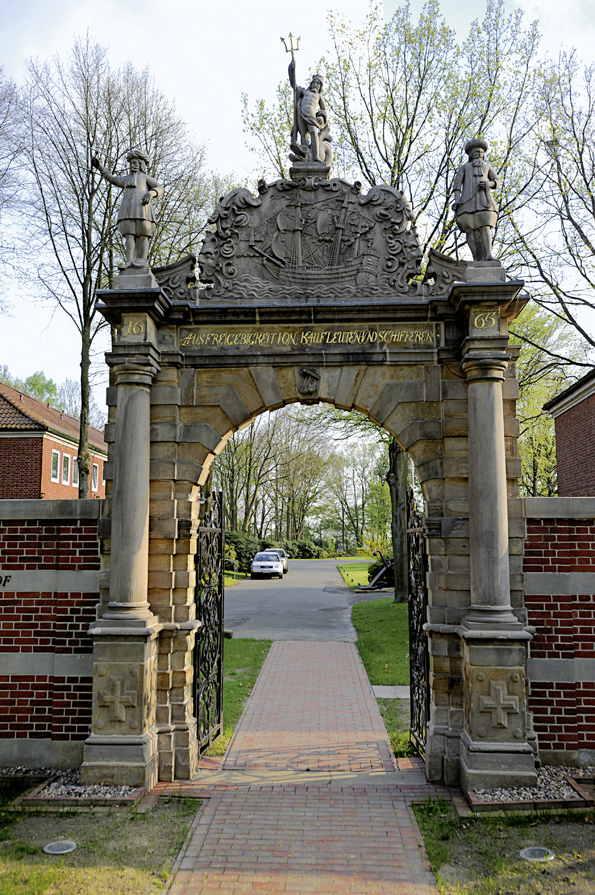
- Portal of Haus Seefahrt from the year 1665
- Formation: 1545; 481 years ago
- Founded at: Grohn, Bremen, Germany
- Type: Foundation
- Legal status: active
- Purpose: care of old seafarers and their wives
- Origins: 16th century
- Region served: Germany

The Haus Seefahrt in Bremen, Germany is a foundation for the care of old seafarers and their wives or widows. For more than 470 years, the foundation has been organizing the Schaffermahlzeit, the longest-running annual meal event in the world. The foundation is considered the oldest still existing social fund [s] in Europe, the establishment of which was approved and confirmed in a document by the City Council of Bremen in 1545. The portal of Haus Seefahrt, the monastery building and two sculptures on the site are under cultural heritage protection.

== History ==
In the Middle Ages, before the Reformation, seafarers in the city of Bremen had the prospect of the church supporting them with gifts in times of poverty. When the events of the Reformation limited daily help for the poor outside the church doors, seafarers and their families who got into trouble because of accidents or the loss of a ship went away empty-handed. Like the Schiffercompagnie Stralsund, in Bremen, the Schiffergesellschaft, a long-established association of seafarers to cultivate sociability and mutual aid, developed plans for an organization to help distressed seafarers A relief fund named Haus Seefahrt (House Seafarers) was thus founded in 1545. It was managed by 8 directors and 22 deputies. At the annual accounting, two directors resigned and two new ones was elected.

The construction of the port of Vegesack was an urgent project financed in 1619 – 1623 by the foundation, who also managed it until 1671 and then leased it. The port is regarded as the first artificial seaport in Germany.

== The foundation today ==
At present, the foundation, take care of its old seafaring members and their wives or widows. It is supported in many ways by donations and contributions from Bremen merchants and captains. Likewise, the seafarers contribute their financial share through the annual payment of their travel or countryman's allowance and thereby acquire the right to the services of the foundation. Every year, the foundation elects three new commercial members, who then organize the annual Schaffermahlzeit two years after their election. This event ensures a considerable amount of donations, which contribute significantly to the fulfillment of the foundation's tasks.
