= Ernst Siemerling =

German neurologist and psychiatrist

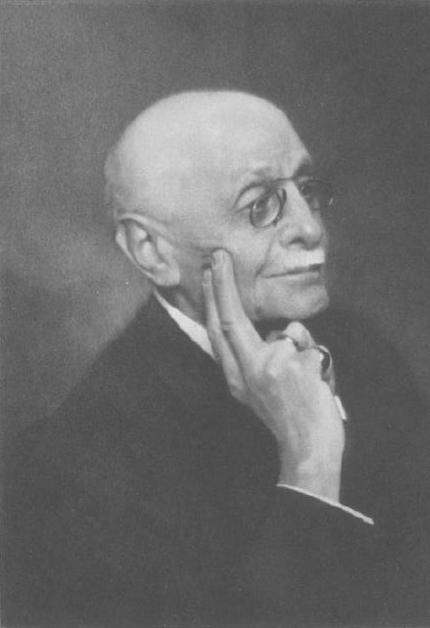
Ernst Siemerling.

Ernst Siemerling (September 9, 1857 – January 6, 1931) was a German neurologist and psychiatrist born in Müssow near Greifswald.

In 1882 he obtained his medical doctorate from the University of Marburg. In 1883-84 he was an assistant at the psychiatric clinic at Halle, and afterwards an assistant to Karl Westphal (1833-1890) at the Berlin psychiatric clinic.

In 1888 he became habilitated for neurology and psychiatry, later being appointed professor and director of the psychiatric clinic at the University of Tübingen (1893). In 1900 he accepted a similar position at the University of Kiel, where he remained until his retirement in 1926.

In 1923, with Hans Gerhard Creutzfeldt (1885-1964), he described adrenoleukodystrophy (ALD), a rare disorder that is sometimes referred to as "Siemerling-Creutzfeldt Disease". With Oswald Bumke (1877-1950), he was editor of the Archiv für Psychiatrie und Nervenkrankheiten, and with Otto Binswanger (1852-1929), was co-author of Lehrbuch der Psychiatrie, a textbook on psychiatry that was published in several editions.
