= Louise Kugler =

German painter and poet

Louise Kugler (Note: Some sources identify her as Luise Kugler.) (10 October 1811 – 6 September 1884) was a German painter and poet.

== Biography ==
Charlotte Louise Kugler was born into a leading commercial family in Stettin, at that time entering the sixth year of just over seven under French occupation. Her father, Johann Georg Emmanuel Kugler (1777-1843), was a prominent city businessman, councillor, and consul. He was also a part-time poet. Her mother, Sophie Dorothea Eleonora Sternberg (1781-1854), was a preacher's daughter. Both her parents had a deep interest in the arts: writers, musicians, and artists were frequent and welcome guests in the family home. She had at least two elder brothers, the younger of whom, Franz Theodor Kugler (1808-1858), would later achieve a level of eminence as an art historian and cultural administrator for the Prussian state. Both siblings received art lessons in Stettin which took them beyond the level of mere dabbling.

She subsequently moved with her brother to live in Berlin where Louise studied with Carl Begas who since 1826 had been a professor at the Prussian Academy of Arts. From whim she learned, in particular, the art of portraiture. Later her artistic focus switched to the (less potentially remunerative) subjects of flowers, illustrations, and arabesque designs. Her brother, meanwhile, increasingly switched away from painting and towards the academic study of Art History, as a more secure means of obtaining a secure income. He obtained his doctorate in 1831. Franz Kugler's assessment of his sister's progress as an artist was cautious: "There is still something dilletantiste in this work, but it is certainly captures a lively sense of poetry and is executed with a strikingly fine sense of style in the way it uses colour and form". (Note: "Es ist wohl noch etwas Dilettantisches in diesen Arbeiten, doch sie sind mit lebendig poetischen Sinne aufgefasst und zugleich mit einem eigenthümlich feinen Stylgefühle in Formen und Farben durchgeführt.")

When father died in 1843 Louise Kugler moved in to live with her mother, who by this time was also living in Berlin. Her brother Franz, who by now had a wife and children of his own, lived close by and was evidently seen as the head of the wider family. Franz had by now acquired an important government job in the arts sector and his Berlin home had become something of a literary salon, with Jakob Burckhardt, Theodor Fontane, Emmanuel Geibel, Paul Heyse, and the painter Adolph Menzel among its members. Within this group of arts celebrities Louise Kugler sustained an independent position. She was forthright with her opinions, in the judgement of one commentator, "not a muse ... but in search of her own muses", the first to know about new work from leading poets and new areas of research picked out by historians, always happy to listen to and criticise constructively new pieces of work ahead of publication. There also survives from this period an album of portraits that she painted.

Her "Morgenländische Mythus" dates from 1847: it consists of 15 pages of poems and illustrations, based on "oriental themes" provided by her friend, the newly fashionable poet-playwright Emanuel Geibel. The illustrations attracted much comment when they appeared at the "Academic Exhibition" in Berlin and were in the end purchased by the Empress Alexandra Feodorovna of Russia (born a Prussian princess). The empress in due course made a gift of the illustrations to the Grand Duchess of Mecklenburg who in 1855 had a coloured-in version created, which was considered a great treasure. Despite the publicity this brought her, by this time Louise Kugler had left Berlin and was for most purposes quickly forgotten there.

In September 1849 she moved with her mother (who died a few years later) to Bremen. The reasons for the move may have been, at least in part, financial. Shortly after this she accepted the offer of Adolf Meyer, a successful tobacco wholesaler (whose Mexican-born wife had recently died), to move into his family home and run it. The main tasks involved bringing up the four children who had just lost their mother. One of the children, Felicie Meyer (1838-1920), seems to have formed a particularly close bond with Kugler. It is not clear what this change in domestic arrangements meant for Louisa Kugler in personal terms, but it clearly meant withdrawing from her social networks in the Berlin artistic circles, and her career never resumed its former trajectory. In 1860 Felicie Meyer married the poet and senator Otto Gildemeister. It was in several ways a "good marriage", but for Louise Kugler it meant an end, in 1863, both to her life as a foster-mother and educator and to what had evidently been a reasonable income. At the age of 52 she was forced to re-invent herself again.

During the first part of 1863 Louise Kugler moved to Munich where she had relatives. She lived for several months a frugal existence in lodgings, but by the end of 1863 had returned to Bremen. She now published a collection of short written pieces, described as a "Spruchgarten" (loosely, "garden of proverbs and aphorisms") that she had prepared with illustrations in 1849, shortly after her earlier move to Bremen. A second "Spruchbuch" appeared in 1863. Although it came without illustrations, it was more successful commercially, running to five editions by 1888. In 1872 she produced another little volume, "Die vier Jahreszeiten".

During her final years she developed a good friendship with the poet Amalie "Molly" Murtfeldt with whom she conducted an at times lively correspondence. Unable to live purely on the proceeds of her poetry, she also undertook some private tutoring and received a certain amount of discrete financial support from the Gildemeisters, who remained supportive till the end.

Following several years of illness, Louise Kugler died in Bremen on 6 September 1884.
