= Adolf von Thadden =

German politician (1921–1996)

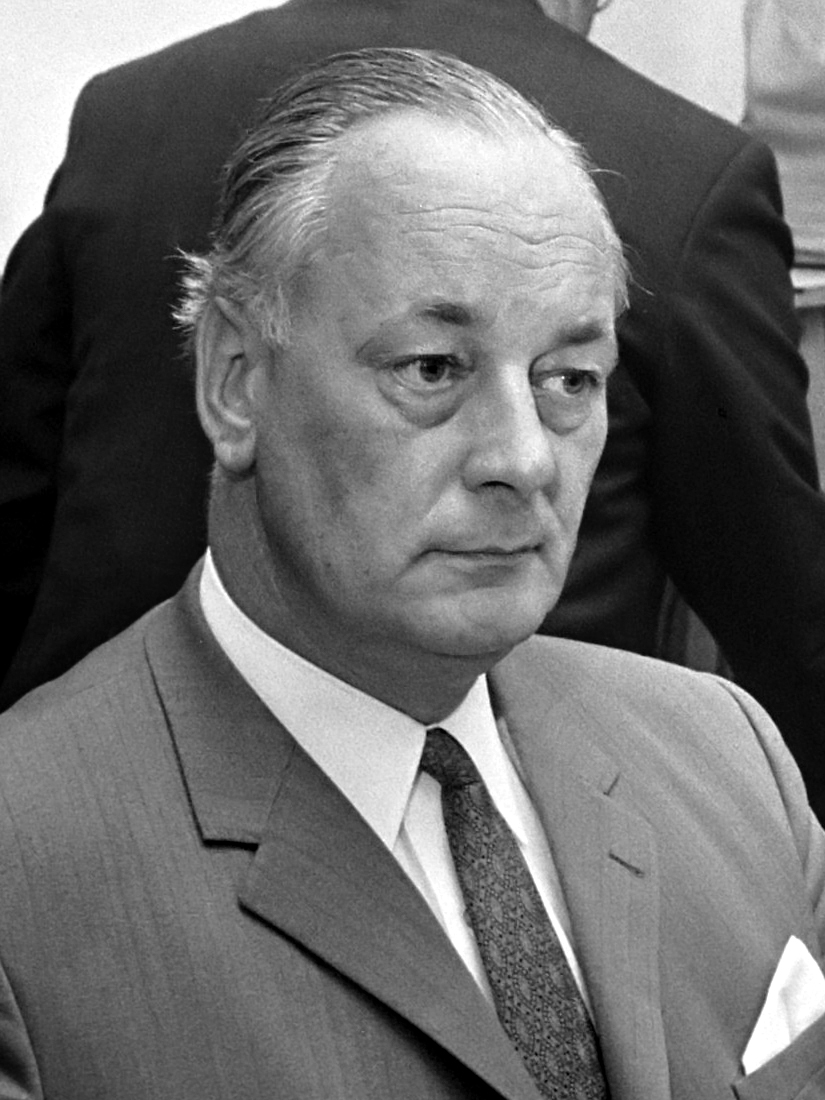
- von Thadden in 1969

President of the National Democratic Party
- In office 1967–1971
- Preceded by: Friedrich Thielen
- Succeeded by: Martin Mussgnug

Member of the Bundestag
- In office 15 August 1949 – 6 September 1953
- Constituency: Lower Saxony
- In office 16 September 1957 – 1959
- Constituency: Lower Saxony

Member of the Bundesrat
- In office 7 September 1953 – 15 September 1957
- Constituency: Lower Saxony

Personal details
- Born: 7 July 1921 Gut Trieglaf, Pomerania, Germany
- Died: 16 July 1996 (aged 75) Bad Oeynhausen, North Rhine-Westphalia, Germany
- Party: National Socialist German Workers' Party (1939–1945); German Right Party (1946–1950); German Empire Party (1950–1964); National Democratic Party (1964–1975)
- Relatives: Elisabeth von Thadden (half-sister)
- Occupation: Politician, landowner

Military service
- Allegiance: Nazi Germany
- Branch/service: Wehrmacht
- Years of service: 1939–1945
- Rank: Lieutenant
- Battles/wars: World War II

Adolf von Thadden (7 July 1921 – 16 July 1996) was a German far-right politician who led the National Democratic Party.

== Early life ==
Adolf von Thadden was born at the noble estate of Gut Trieglaff, near Greifenberg, Pomerania, on 7 July 1921, to Adolf Gerhard Ludwig von Thadden and his second wife. He was a member of the Junker Thadden family. His half-sister Elisabeth von Thadden was executed by the Nazis in 1944.

Thadden was educated at the gymnasium in Greifenberg and subsequently studied agriculture and economics. He became member number 7,155,873 of the Nazi Party on 1 September 1939.

Thadden served as a lieutenant with the Wehrmacht in the Second World War, suffering a number of battle injuries during the conflict. A brigade adjutant in the artillery section, he was captured near the end of the war by Polish forces. Thadden later went to court to sue over rumours that he had collaborated with the Poles during his imprisonment. He was successful in his case.

Thadden was arrested by American authorities, but released in June 1945. He joined his half-sister Ehrengard in Göttingen as the family's estate in Pomerania was taken over by the Polish. He went to the estate in September, but was arrested and imprisoned for nine months. After being released he returned to Göttingen with his mother and sister. The British Property Control in Göttingen employed him.

== Political career ==
After the war, Thadden entered politics as a member of the Deutsche Rechtspartei and of its successor the Deutsche Reichspartei. As a member of both, he served as a councilman in Göttingen from 1948 to 1958. Elected to the Bundestag in 1949, he was the second-youngest member and was thus addressed by an SPD member as "Bubi", a nickname that stuck with him. He became the main writer on the party organ Reichsruf, gaining a reputation both for his demagogy and for his extensive use of humour and wit. He remained a Bundestag member to 1953 and served again from 1955 to 1959, was a Senator from 1952 to 1958 and a member of the Landtag of Lower Saxony from 1956 to 1959.

In the 1950s he was befriended by Winifred Wagner, whose grandson Gottfried Wagner later recalled that

My aunt Friedelind was outraged when my grandmother again slowly blossomed as the first lady of right-wing groups and received political friends such as Edda Goering, Ilse Hess, the former NPD chairman (sic) Adolf von Thadden, Gerdy Troost, the wife of the Nazi architect and friend of Hitler Paul Ludwig Troost, the British fascist leader Oswald Mosley, the Nazi film director Karl Ritter and the racist author and former Senator of the Reich Hans Severus Ziegler."

Having served as deputy to the Deutsche Reichspartei leader Wilhelm Meinberg, Thadden became chairman of the party in 1961, and in this position was one of the signatories of the European Declaration at Venice which set up the National Party of Europe (NPE). Thadden was personally close to the British Union Movement leader Oswald Mosley, on whose initiative the NPE was founded, and was attracted to Mosley's concept of Europe a Nation. He specifically denied any accusations of neo-Nazism levelled at him, portraying himself as a supporter of conservative nationalism. However, he was frequently labelled a neo-Nazi due to his prominent opposition to the notion of any German guilt for the Second World War.

=== NPD ===
Thadden played a leading role in 1964 formation of the National Democratic Party of Germany (NPD) by merging his Reichspartei with a number of other rightist groups, including a revived German National People's Party. He was initially overlooked as leader of the amalgamated group in favour of Friedrich Thielen of the German Party. Thadden regularly clashed with the more moderate Thielen, and both men became involved in several lawsuits against each other, each aiming at gaining control of the NPD and ousting his rival from membership.

Thadden was eventually elected NPD chairman in 1967. He moved the party to the right, bringing in policies such as withdrawal from NATO, a return of Danzig to a united Germany, wide-ranging reform of the constitution and possibly a second Anschluss. In one of his more widely reported activities, Thadden accidentally referred to the party as "National Socialists" rather than "National Democrats" in a television interview, something that was frequently brought up by critics who accused Thadden and his party of neo-Nazism. He remained leader until 1971, achieving strong showings in regional elections, although the party failed to gain representation in the Bundestag under his leadership (and have never succeeded in doing so). Although a loyal supporter of his successor, Martin Mussgnug, Thadden eventually left the NPD in 1975 after Gerhard Frey, who had previously been a harsh critic of von Thadden, was appointed Federal Administrator of the party.

Thadden left active politics in 1974 and worked for a construction-firm, although he remained as chief editor of the Deutsche Wochenzeitung into the 1980s. He maintained an interest in publishing for several years and was reported as acting on behalf of the Gesellschaft für freie Publizistik, a far-right journalism organisation linked to the NPD in 1981 and 1982.

== Personal life ==
Thadden married Edith Lange, with whom he had two children. He died on 16 July 1996, in Bad Oeynhausen, at the age of 75. Since Thadden's death, it has been claimed that he was a secret agent of the United Kingdom's external security agency, MI6.

== Works cited ==
- Long, Wellington (1968). The New Nazis of Germany. Chilton Company.
