= Falko E. P. Wilms =

German sociologist, and social systems theorist (born 1961)

- Born: July 30, 1961; Bremen, West Germany
- Known for: Management, systems theory, Organizational Behavior and Dialogue
- Scientific career
- Fields: management, decision making, organizational development
- Institutions: Vorarlberg University of Applied Sciences

Falko E. P. Wilms (born July 30, 1961) is a German economist and social scientist. He is a professor, consultant and coach.

== Academic life ==
He studied Economics and Social Sciences at the Lüneburg University (Germany), where he earned his first degree in 1989 and later a Ph.D. in economics in 1994. His Ph.D. thesis entitled Multi Criteria Decision Making (MCDM) was supervised by Egbert Kahle. Since 1998 he has been a Professor of Organizational Behavior at Vorarlberg University of Applied Sciences in Dornbirn, Austria. There he created a communication and collaboration study group, which he still leads today.

== Research interests ==
Wilms’ research focuses on Management Studies. He is of the opinion that management is a profession concerned with control in certain types of systems (enterprises and organizations). Therefore, he embeds Niklas Luhmann’s system theory within Management Studies.

He also engages in research covering Organizational Behavior and Dialogue.

== Consulting Topics ==
Wilms’ consulting focuses on system thinking, team building, decision making, scenario analysis, change management, Socratic dialogue and Bohm Dialogue.

== Publications ==
- Wilms, Falko E. P. 1995. Entscheidungsverhalten als rekursiver Prozeß (trans. Decision-making behaviour as a recursive process). Gabler: Wiesbaden. ISBN 3-409-13190-6.
- Wilms, Falko E.P. 2001. Systemorientiertes Management (trans. System-oriented management). Vahlen: Munich.
- Wilms, Falko E. P. 2006. Szenariotechnik. Vom Umgang mit der Zukunft (trans. The scenario technique: How to cope with the future). Haupt: Bern.
- Wilms, Falko E. P. & Thiel, M. 2007. Unternehmensführung (trans. Corporate management). Haupt: Bern.
- Wilms, Falko E. P. & Jancsary, P. M. 2008. Über das Dialogische (trans. Concerning the dialogic). wvb: Berlin.

== Journals ==
Since 2000 Editor of the biannual journal SEM-RADAR Zeitschrift für Systemdenken und Entscheidungsfindung im Management (trans. SEM-RADAR Journal of Systems Thinking and Decision Making in Management) ISSN 1610-8914
