= Heinrich Averbeck =

Dr. Heinrich Averbeck
- Born: Johann Heinrich Bernhard Martin Averbeck; August 13, 1844; Bremen, German Confederation
- Died: February 2, 1889 (aged 44)
- Occupation: Physician
- Years active: 1868–1889
- Known for: Pioneer in physiotherapy; research on acute neurasthenia
- Medical career
- Profession: Physician
- Field: Physical medicine, obstetrics
- Institutions: Bad Laubach health spa and physical therapy clinic
- Sub-specialties: Physiotherapy
- Research: Neurasthenia
- Notable works: Die akute Neurasthenie, die plötzliche Erschöpfung der nervösen Energie

Johann Heinrich Bernhard Martin Averbeck (13 August 1844 – 2 February 1889) was a German medical doctor who was a native of Bremen.

In 1868 he earned his medical doctorate at the University of Basel, where he was a student of Carl von Liebermeister (1833–1901). He also studied at the Universities of Heidelberg, Göttingen and Tübingen, and in addition to Liebermeister, regarded Karl Ewald Hasse (1810–1902), Jakob Henle (1809–1885) and August Socin (1837–1889) as important influences to his medical career.

Between 1868 and 1879 Averbeck was a general practitioner and obstetrician in Bremen, and in 1879 opened an institute for physical therapy at Baden-Baden. Beginning in 1882 he developed a health spa and physical therapy clinic at Bad Laubach bei Koblenz, which was described as a model institution of physical medicine.

Averbeck was a pioneer in the field of physiotherapy. He believed that the right combination of therapeutic exercises and massage were vital in the treatment of chronic illness and disease. Among his written works was a treatise on acute neurasthenia called Die akute Neurasthenie, die plötzliche Erschöpfung der nervösen Energie. Reportedly, Sigmund Freud found it an important reference work in his research involving the correlation of modern-day stress and neurasthenia.

Averbeck was brother-in-law to neurologist Otto Binswanger (1852–1929).

== Selected writings ==
- Die Addisonsche Krankheit (Addison's disease), Erlangen- 1869
- Die Medizinische Gymnastik (Medical gymnastics), Stuttgart- 1882
- Die Kurorte, ihre Aufgabe und Zukunft (The spa, its mission and future).
- Über Massagebehandlung bei Leberleiden (On massage treatment for liver disease), 1885
- Die psychologische Bedeutung der Heilgymnastik und Massage bei der Behandlung gewisser Nervenleiden (The psychological importance of therapeutic exercise and massage in the treatment of certain nervous disorders), 1886
- Die akute Neurasthenie, die plötzliche Erschöpfung der nervösen Energie (Acute neurasthenia, the sudden exhaustion of nervous energy), 1886
