= Friedrich Thielen =

German politician (1916–1993)

President of the NPD
- In office 1964–1967
- Succeeded by: Adolf von Thadden

Deputy of the Bürgerschaft of Bremen
- In office 13 October 1947 – August 1959
- Constituency: Bremen

Personal details
- Born: 25 September 1916 Bremen, German Empire
- Died: 11 June 1993 (aged 76) Bremen, Germany
- Party: Christian Democratic Union (1946–1959); German Party (1959–1961); All-German Bloc/League of Expellees and Deprived of Rights (1962–1964); National Democratic Party (1964–1967); National People's Party (1967); German Party
- Occupation: Politician

Friedrich-Georg "Fritz" Thielen (25 September 1916 – 11 June 1993) was a German politician with the Christian Democratic Union (CDU), the German Party, the Gesamtdeutsche Partei and the National Democratic Party of Germany (NPD).

Thielen was born in Bremen and after working as a sawmill operator in Germany and in brickyards in occupied Ukraine, Thielen became a soldier in 1943 until the end of World War II. After the war he became a successful businessman in the building trade in Bremen.

He joined the CDU in 1946 and became a leading figure locally before decamping to join the German Party in 1958, becoming one of its leading figures. In this capacity he merged his party into the newly formed NPD and became the first leader of the party. Replaced by Adolf von Thadden in 1967 he left the NPD and reactivated the German Party locally, with little success.
