= Amalie Murtfeldt =

German painter

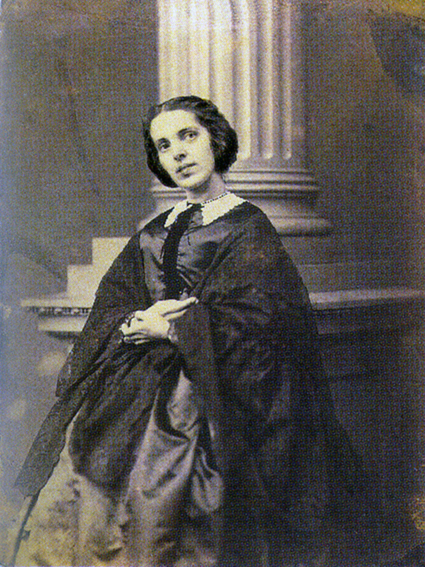
- Born: 22 March 1828; Bremen, Germany
- Died: 28 June 1888 (aged 60); Bremen, Germany
- Education: Düsseldorf Arts Academy
- Known for: Portraits

Amalie Murtfeldt (22 March 1828 – 28 June 1888) was a German painter, especially of portraits.

== Early life ==
Amalie Henriette Sophie Murtfeldt was born on March 22, 1828, in Bremen. She was the younger of her parents' two surviving children. Her parents, Carl Friedrich Murtfeldt and Friederike B. Schneidel belonged to the diminishing bourgeoisie.

Her parents were conscious of living in a state of declining prosperity. They were concerned that because of the family's poverty, neither daughter would receive a dowry. Therefore, Amalie and her sister, Ida, received an "exceptionally intensive 'academic' education" that focused on their talents.

Ida Murtfeldt embarked on musical studies, which led to her becoming a piano teacher, while Amalie underwent a 30-month apprenticeship with the Bremen portrait artist Karl Kirchner. The outcome was that both daughters reached adulthood with a sound practical education, a rare privilege among women in the middle part of the 19th century.

== Career ==
In 1849, Amalie was awarded a three-year acceptance by the senate of Bremen that allowed her to be educated at the private Kunstakademie Düsseldorf by Karl Ferdinand Sohn. She was the first female artist to receive a bursary from the senate.

In 1852, she continued her studies in Berlin, where she started copying masterworks in museums. These initial years were marked by close contact to the Kugler circle, which encompassed the Bremen artist Louise Kugler, poet-novelist Paul Heyse from Munich and the art critic Friedrich Eggers, originally from Rostock. Between the years of 1855 and 1857, she was based in Paris, learning at the prestigious "atelier" of the "history of painting" artist Thomas Couture and undertaking intensive studies on some of the works of the Louvre.

She returned to Bremen in 1857, and for almost 10 years taught drawing at Höheren Töchterschule girls' secondary school of Meta Albers. She inspired a generation of schoolgirls, who loyally continued to support her after she opened her first studio and launched herself as a freelance artist in Bremen. From 1868 to 1869, Amalie traveled to Italy to continue her studies, with a particular focus on Rome. She set up her own studio with the help of supporters from more prosperous Bremen merchant families, notably the Gildemeisters, the Nielsens, and the Trevinarus family. The support given by leading families brought major benefits to her art works.

Amalie later found herself required to make compromises within her art. Amalie was dependent on commissions from the Bremen haute-bourgeoisie. A new wave, represented in Bremen by Arthur Fitger, drew inspiration from classical, historical and mythological themes. In contrast, the Hanseatic merchant patriarchs preferred to take their queue from the Dutch Golden Age paintings. Those traditions were consciously aloof from "luxurious, purposeless" art, and in Bremen found their outlet, above all, in portraiture. Bremen's business elite surrounded themselves with art that they could identify as "necessary".

Amalie exhibited three portraits as early as 1850, at a major art exhibition at the Bremen Art Museum ("Kunsthalle Bremen"), and her work featured regularly at subsequent exhibitions until 1874. Her artistic legacy is dominated by portraits for leading Bremen families, and she could not avoid the forced adoption of conservatism on the art scene in Bremen. The time and energy that she had to devote to commissioned portraits and teaching work left her creative efforts artist confined to a parallel secondary career.

=== Middle years ===
As the years passed, Amalie became aware that her artistic career had fallen short of her hopes. She began to withdraw from the public eye. Her friend and admirer, the well-regarded artist Arthur Fitger wrote, "Amalie Murtfeldt became ever more distant from the wider public in her final years, as her sensitive spirit became less keen than hitherto on exposing her art to the judgment of the general public. But for the few people who had the good fortune to be permitted access to her studio, for those chosen ones, who have the joy of owning one of her works and being able to encounter it afresh each day, came the appreciation of how far she had perfected her talents, restlessly striving with the passing years."

== Death ==
On June 28, 1888, aged 60, Amalie, who had been weakening, died. Her grave is located in the Riensberg Cemetery. Fitger delivered a telling appreciation of Amalie's talents in a speech at her funeral. He stressed the harmonious coming together of human and artistic qualities that she was able to bring to her work, thanks to her unusually sensitive personality.

== Legacy ==
In 1889, approximately a year after her death, a commemorative exhibition of her works was presented at the city's Art Museum ("Kunsthalle Bremen") at Fitger's request. Her abundant portraiture was well represented, along with paintings of bathing nymphs, Maenad, classical tambouristas and gypsy figures. The exhibition provided an excellent display of the phases of her career, launching a revival of interest in her work among Bremen's art lovers.

Fitger was both a friend and an artist whose own stylist approach was close to Amalie's own. He was not alone in praising her among arts scholars and commentators of the time. Nevertheless, neither Fitzger nor Amalie transcended their own age, and their artistic vision had fallen out of fashion by the time of Fitger's own death in 1909.

The affection she received for her portraiture by members of Bremen's ruling class during the final decades of the nineteenth century means that her work has not entirely disappeared from view. Dr. Löhr of Bremen's Focke Museum (which includes in its collection two of her portraits, from 1860 and 1888), considers her work "competently crafted but not outstanding" ("handwerklich ordentlich, aber nicht überragend").
