= Ada Halenza =

German author (1900–1990)

- Born: 20 April 1900; Bremen, German Empire
- Died: 10 July 1990 (aged 90); Bremen, West Germany

Ada Halenza or Magda Koch (20 April 1900 – 10 July 1990) was a German writer noted for her association with Bremen.

== Life ==
Halenza was born in Bremen in 1900 to Friedrich and Berta Halenza. She grew up in Bremen in the area known as Ostertorviertel and graduated from a private school. She lived in Berlin in the 1920s and married the actor Rudolf Koch-Riehl. In 1944 her husband became the director of the Theater am Schiffbauerdamm. She wrote the comedy Herzjunge (Beloved Boy), which was performed here.

After the Second World War, she moved back to northern Germany where she wrote radio plays and film scripts. Her husband was a director and actor at the Bremen Art Theater. She became known principally because of her Radio Bremen stories involving the two cleaning ladies Madda and Kede. The stories are written in the local dialect of Bremen.

In 1956, after the death of her husband, she and her sister-in-law ran a private nursery school. Halenza died in Bremen in 1990.
