= Uwe Behrens =

German footballer

Personal information
- Date of birth: 10 April 1959 (age 66)
- Place of birth: West Germany
- Position: Striker

Senior career*
Years	Team	Apps	(Gls)
1979–1982	Werder Bremen	22	(5)
1982–1983	Arminia Hannover		
- * Club domestic league appearances and goals

Uwe Behrens (born 10 April 1959) is a German former footballer who played as a striker.

Behrens made 16 appearances for SV Werder Bremen in the Bundesliga during his playing career. He is kit manager for the club.
