= Trzygłów, West Pomeranian Voivodeship =

Trzygłów
- Village
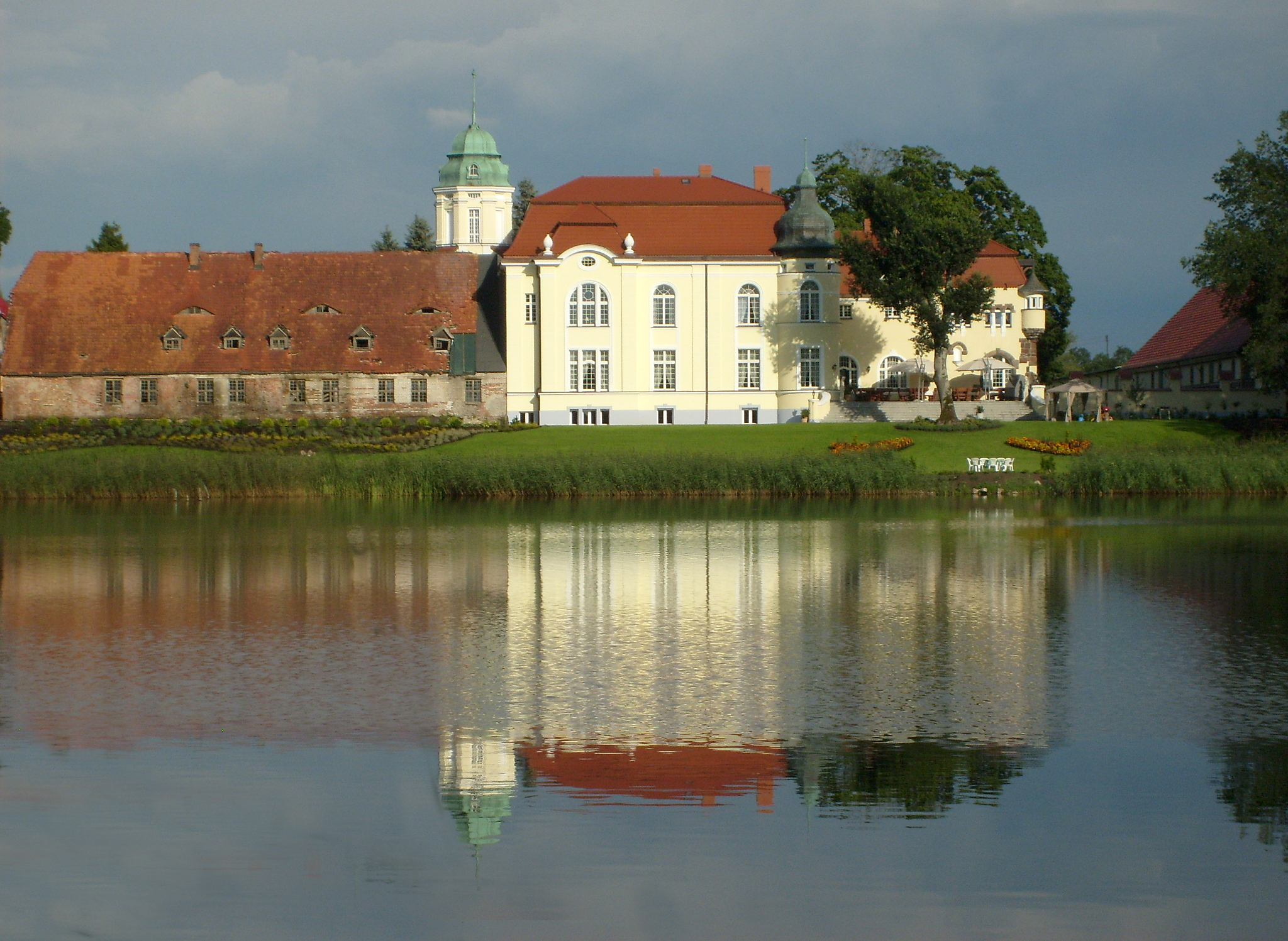
- Manor in the village
- Interactive map of Trzygłów
- Location within Poland
- Coordinates: 53°51′39″N 15°9′48″E
- Country: Poland
- Voivodeship: West Pomeranian
- County: Gryfice
- Gmina: Gryfice

Population
  - Total: 670

Trzygłów [ˈtʂɨɡwuf] (German: Trieglaff) is a village in the administrative district of Gmina Gryfice, within Gryfice County, West Pomeranian Voivodeship, in north-western Poland. It lies approximately 7 km (4 mi) south of Gryfice and 63 km (39 mi) north-east of the regional capital Szczecin.

The village has a population of 670.

== See also ==
- History of Pomerania

== Notable residents ==
- Adolf von Thadden (1921–1996), German politician
