= German Party (1961) =

Political party in West Germany (1961–1980)

German Party Deutsche Partei
- Founded: 1961
- Dissolved: 1980
- Split from: German Party (1947)
- Succeeded by: German Party (1993)
- Ideology: National conservatism
- Political position: Right-wing to Far-right

The German Party was a minor conservative party active in West Germany between 1961 and 1980.

It was founded by former members of the conservative German Party founded in 1947 who were dissatisfied with its failure to gain electoral representation after their merger with the refugees' party the All-German Bloc/League of Expellees and Deprived of Rights.

The newly formed German Party contested the state election of Lower Saxony in 1963. However, with 2.7 per cent of the vote (as compared to the "old" party's 12.3 per cent in 1959) it failed to win representation. Cut off from the conservative mainstream a number of German Party's functionaries participated in the foundation of the far-right National Democratic Party. Party activist Friedrich Thielen was chosen as the leader of the new party but was ousted in 1967 by Adolf von Thadden.

Thielen left, as he felt von Thadden was too sympathetic to Nazism, and tried to re-found the German Party. However the new incarnation failed to become even a local force and ceased to operate as a political party in 1980.

== Bibliography ==
- André Freudenberg: Freiheitlich-konservative Kleinparteien im wiedervereinigten Deutschland: Bund Freier Bürger, Deutsche Partei, Deutsche Soziale Union, Partei Rechtsstaatlicher Offensive. Leipzig: Engelsdorfer Verlag, 2009, ISBN 3-86901-228-5.
