= Schaffermahlzeit =

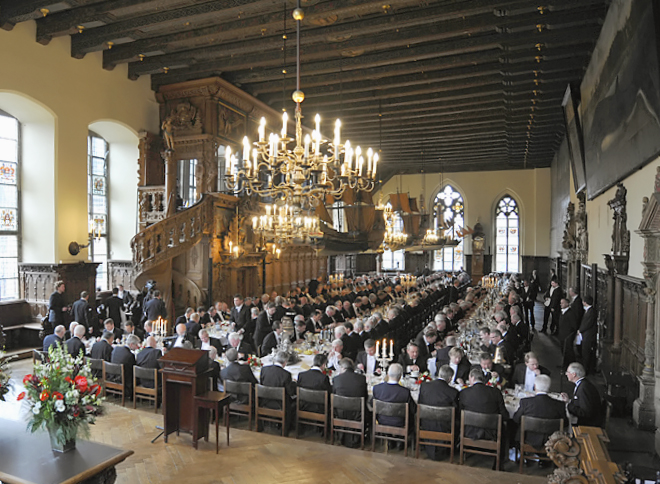
2009 Schaffermahlzeit, Bremen Town Hall

The Schaffermahlzeit (literally "Worker's Meal") is an annual banquet held in Bremen, Germany for merchants and shipping managers. It is the longest-running annual meal event in the world, having been held since 1545. It is generally hosted by three "Schaffers", who organise and pay for the banquet.

Schaffermahlzeit has been held in the Bremen Town Hall since 1952, and hosts 200 seafaring workers and 100 public figures each year. The figures are invited on the condition that they will donate to the town's foundation. Women have been traditionally excluded from the meal, which led to criticism until the convention was abandoned in 2019.

== History ==
As it is always held on the second Friday in February, the meal was originally held as a farewell for sailors embarking in the Spring. The Bremen council gave permission to the Sailor's guild to hold the event and collect donations from the public in 1545.

For many years, a banquet took place in the foundation members' own homes, initially in the house acquired in 1561 in the Hutfilterstrasse, now part of the Altstadt district of Bremen, and from 1663 on the same street in a new building constructed by the foundation. This meal was called the Schaffermahlzeit from around 1660. Later, every two years, from 1855, three Bremen merchants were chosen as new members of the board, who had the responsibility of organising and paying for the event.

== Today ==
=== 2020 Protest ===
On February 14, 2020, environment protesters from the Fridays For Future, Ende Gelände and BUND demonstrated outside the Schaffermahlzeit. The protesters were directing their pleas towards the many government officials attending, particularly Federal Minister for Economic Affairs and Energy, Peter Altmaier. Local law enforcement procured an entrance for the displaced attendees, and during the meal Altmaier expressed his approval of expanding Bremen's climate policy with Wind power.
