= Jonathan Schmude =

German footballer

Personal information
- Date of birth: 31 May 1992 (age 34)
- Place of birth: Bremen, Germany
- Height: 1.78 m (5 ft 10 in)
- Position: Right-back

Youth career
- –2004: FC Langwedel
- 2004–2011: Werder Bremen

Senior career*
Years	Team	Apps	(Gls)
2011–2013	Werder Bremen II	24	(0)
2013–2014	Hannover 96 II	6	(0)
2014–2015	TSV Ottersberg	19	(4)
Total		49	(4)
- * Club domestic league appearances and goals

Jonathan Schmude (born 31 May 1992) is a German former professional footballer who played as a right-back.

== Career ==
Schmude began his career with SV Werder Bremen, and made his debut for the reserve team in December 2011, as a substitute for Leon Balogun in a 3–2 defeat to Arminia Bielefeld in the 3. Liga. In 2013, he signed for Hannover 96 II.
