= Das Große Bremen-Lexikon =

German encyclopaedia

Das Große Bremen-Lexikon is a printed encyclopedia which covers the Freie Hansestadt Bremen, written by Herbert Schwarzwälder about

- the region, as Territory of Bremen, as Prince-Archbishopric of Bremen (Bremen Archbishopric), as Bremen-Verden and
- an encyclopaedia of the Hanseatic city Bremen and the maritime city Bremerhaven.

== History ==
In Bremen, Brema literata was published anonymously in 1709 by Heinrich Iken. The fourth edition was last published in an adaptation by Hermann Post in 1726. In the work were reported gossips by writers and scholars.

Around 1765 the Bremische Deutsche Gesellschaft started with a work Bremisch-Niedersächsisches Wörterbuch. The work appeared from 1767 to 1772 in five volumes as a regional encyclopaedia. Words, terms and cultural-historical topics were treated.

In 1818, the Lexikon aller Gelehrten by the cathedral pastor Heinrich Wilhelm Rotermund was published as an encyclopaedic collection of biographers.

From 1961 to 1965, the Weser-Kurier published as a book a Kleines Bremer Lexikon from A to Z, which had previously appeared in the newspaper for cutting out.

In 1977, the Bremer Lexikon was published by the Hauschild Verlag. A "key to Bremen" written by Werner Kloos, the director of the Focke-Museum. The third, improved edition from 1997 was edited by Reinhold Thiele. The one-volume work could not cover all topics in sufficient breadth as a manageable handbook, so many keywords had to be missing.

The reference work Großes Bremen-Lexikon by Herbert Schwarzwälder was published in 2002 as well as in 2003 and 2008 in a second edition by the Bremen publishing house Edition Temmen. Schwarzwälder (1919-2011) was professor of history at the University of Bremen and author of various books with a reference to Bremen. After the first (one-volume) edition was out of print, an improved and extended new edition in two volumes (A-K and L-Z) followed in 2003, which was followed by a supplementary volume A-Z in 2008.

== Contents ==
The three-volume encyclopaedia covers the region of Bremen in about 8500 pages with a total of 1216 keywords. It contains keywords on history, politics, biographies (of deceased persons only), culture, education, science as well as Bremensien, historical events, associations and media, religion as well as churches and monasteries, economy and traffic, geography such as city and town districts, rivers, lakes, streets, squares, buildings and sights, companies, sports etc. For many keywords you will find references to further literature or sources. About 1600 illustrative pictures preferably show the historical condition.

== Work ==
- Herbert Schwarzwälder: Das Große Bremen-Lexikon. 1.edition. Edition Temmen, Bremen 2002, ISBN 3-86108-616-6 (832 pages)
- Herbert Schwarzwälder: Das Große Bremen-Lexikon. 2.updated, revised and extended edition. Edition Temmen, Bremen 2003, ISBN 3-86108-693-X, multivolume monograph:
  - Part: Band 1. A–K. (516 pages).
  - Part: Band 2. L–Z. (pages 521–1016).
  - Part: Ergänzungsband A–Z. 1.edition. Edition Temmen, Bremen 2008, ISBN 978-3-86108-986-5 (200 pages).
