= Sebastian Lege =

German chef and TV personality

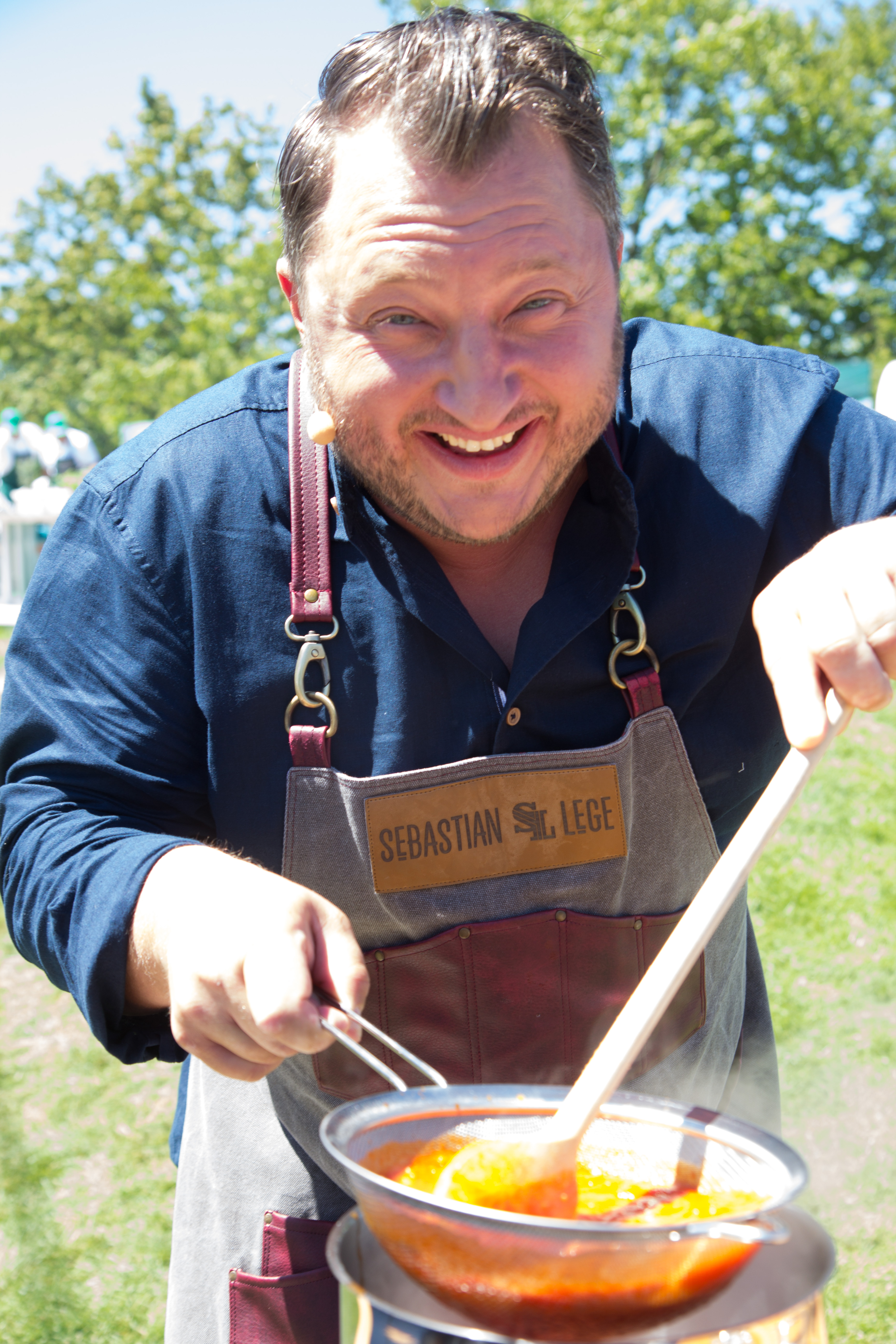
- Lege at the set of ZDF Fernsehgarten in 2018
- Born: Bremen (city), Bremen (state), Germany
- Culinary career
- Television show(s): ZDFzeit, ZDFbesseresser, Lege kommt auf den Geschmack
- Website: sebastianlege.tv

Sebastian Lege (born 27 October 1978) is a German celebrity chef, television personality and food product developer. Known for his signature brand of humor, Lege has grown particularly popular with younger demographics in Germany, eventually starring as the moderator of multiple cuisine-centered TV shows.

== Biography ==
Lege was born in Bremen on 27 October 1978, the son of a plumber and a commercial clerk. He currently lives with his girlfriend in Meerbusch near Düsseldorf.

=== Cooking career ===
In 1994, at the age of 15, Lege opted to undergo an apprenticeship as a cook at a hotel at Bremer Kreuz until he moved to the "Parkhotel Grüner Jäger" in Verden (Aller) a year later. Following his graduation in 1997, he worked as a cook in a multitude of restaurant and hotel kitchens, among them the Ratskeller of the Bremen City Hall. In addition, he entered the position of vice chef for the first time when working at a Sheraton hotel. He moved to Düsseldorf in 2002, where he lives to this day. Here, he would work at the Courtyard by Marriott in Hafen for nearly four years, before turning to job hopping for a while until finally moving up to the position of chef de cuisine at a 5-star restaurant of the Nikko group in February 2009.

=== Merchant career ===
From 2011 to 2015, Lege decided to go freelance as a fish and meat merchant for Michelin starred restaurants, going by the name of "Seafood Feinkost Euro Fisch" (lit.: Seafood delicacies euro fish).

=== Food product development career ===
Since 2011, Lege has been active as a food industry product developer, mostly in the field of food engineering under the name of "SL Food Consulting". Furthermore, in 2021, he founded the "My Food Factory GmbH" in Kulmbach, which additionally offers food distribution and marketing services.

=== Media operating career ===
Starting 2018, Lege has been the Co-CEO of a media production company called "Foodkuss GmbH", headquartered in Meerbusch, which he leads in cooperation with Wolfgang Ehmann.

== TV career ==
Following his appearance as a food expert on Nelson Müller's "Wie gut ist...?" series (part of the ZDFzeit documentary series), broadcast by ZDF in 2012, Lege was called onto an increasing amount of other shows, including both those of further public-law broadcasting as well as private channels, such as ProSieben's infotainment series "Galileo". In February 2016, he received his own ZDFzeit episode called "Die Tricks der Lebensmittelindustrie" (lit.: "The food industry's deceptions"), with two more episodes following in January 2017. Throughout the year, he would also be featured in a variety of cooking and game shows such as "Kerners Köche", "Grill den Henssler", Grill den Profi" and "gekauft, gekocht, gewonnen". While his own quiz show "Quiz mit Biss", which he co-moderated with radio star Media van Hülsen in 2019, was cancelled due to low viewer ratings, Lege proved increasingly popular with younger demographics. This led to ZDF starting a YouTube channel specifically for "Die Tricks der Lebensmittelindustrie"-like formats called ZDFbesseresser, which include pieces on consumer protection and education with Lege detailing various aspects of industrial food engineering. Further publications include challenge videos where Lege is tasked with replicating brand products with no preparation and limited resources. While these are usually very light-hearted, taking advantage of Lege's signature brand of humour, more serious formats, such as interviews with industry veterans exposing major producers and retailers, have also garnered attention. A two-season-long series showcasing Lege exploring the international origins of dishes popular in Germany in a humoristic manner titled "Lege kommt auf den Geschmack" was produced by RTL starting in 2023.
