= Vorarlberg University of Applied Sciences =

Austrian university

Coordinates: 47°24′22″N 09°44′39″E

FHV - University of Applied Sciences
- FHV - University of Applied Sciences
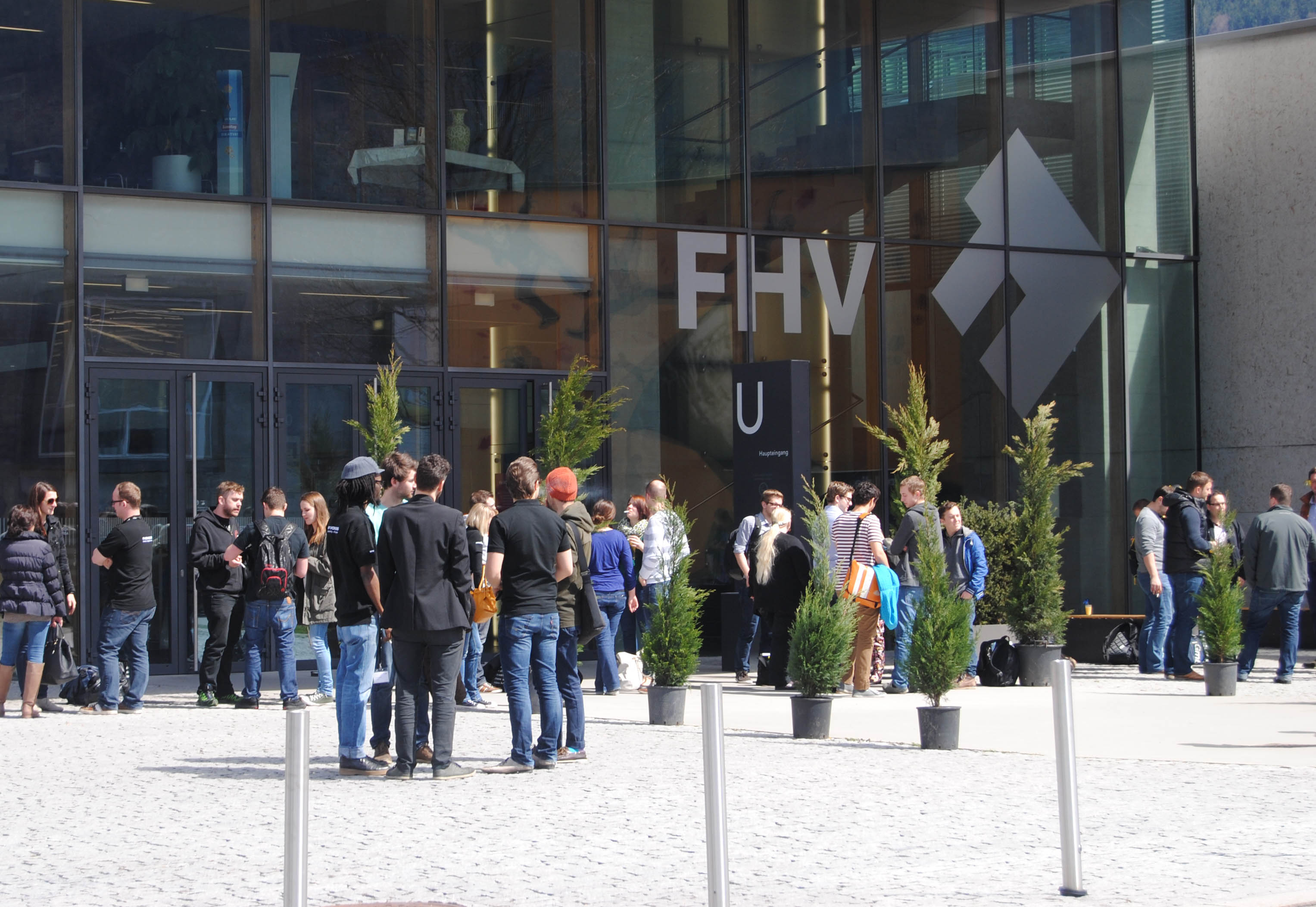
- FH Vorarlberg campus
- Established: 1989 as Technical school, Vorarlberg, 1994 "Technical school, Vorarlberg" to "University of Applied Science degree courses, Vorarlberg", since 1999 University of Applied Science status is granted and the University is named "Fachhochschule Vorarlberg GmbH
- Students: around 1,6002020/2021
- Location: Dornbirn, Vorarlberg, Austria
- Website: www.fhv.at/en/

The Vorarlberg University of Applied Sciences (German: Fachhochschule Vorarlberg) in Dornbirn in Vorarlberg (Austria) is a leading Austrian University of Applied Sciences. It was founded in 1989 going under the name of "Technical School, Vorarlberg".

Its charter is to provide degree programmes with a direct link to work practice. About 1.300 students are currently enrolled in Bachelor's and master's degrees in the areas of Business, Engineering, Design and Social Work. FH Vorarlberg enjoys excellent relations with business and industry in Vorarlberg. Many of the companies are world leaders or among world leaders in their areas. Close cooperation with these top companies means that students can choose from a range of internships and graduates have excellent job prospects. The number of research contracts from business and industry is proof of FH Vorarlberg's strong links to high-tech companies. For instance, in January 2014, the Josef-Ressel-Center for microtechnology has been inaugurated at FH Vorarlberg.

== Awards ==
- 2016: InnoWard - Education Award of the German Insurance Industry Prof. (FH). Dr. Willy C. Kriz, Department of Business and Management
- 2016, 2017: Erasmus+ Award (for the excellent quality in organizing student and staff mobility)
- 2016: Science Award Vorarlberg (awarded to Dr. habil. Dana Seyringer, PhD, Research centre Microtechnology)
- 2014, 2016, 2017: National Award for Family-Friendly University of Applied Sciences (awarded by the Federal Ministry for Family and Youth)
- 2014: Austrian Environmental Education Award ("Ethify Yourself")
- 2014: Best Austrian University of Applied Sciences in the field of Technology
- National Award for Innovation 2013 (special award VERENA for Thien eDrives GmbH in cooperation with the FH Vorarlberg)
- Österreichischer Bauherrenpreis 2000 (Austrian Property Developer Prize)

== Degree courses ==
The FH Vorarlberg offers the following degree courses (status as of 2023):

- Business Administration
  - International Business (BA)
    - Accounting, Controlling & Finance (MA)
    - Business Process Management (MA)
    - Human Resources & Organisation (MA)
    - International Marketing & Sales (MA)
    - International Management and Leadership (MA)
- Engineering & Technology
  - Engineering and Management (BSc)
  - Electrical Engineering Dual (BSc)
  - Computer Science (BSc)
  - Informatik – Digital Innovation (BSc)
  - Mechatronics (BSc)
  - Mechanical Engineering (BSc)
    - Sustainable Energy Systems (MSc)
    - Business Informatics - Digital Transformation (MSc)
    - Computer Science (MSc)
    - Mechatronics (MSc)
- Design
  - InterMedia (BA)
    - InterMedia (MA)
- Social Work & Health
  - Social Work (BA)
  - Health Care and Nursing (BA)
    - Social Work (MA)
