= Herbert Schwarzwälder =

German historian

Herbert Schwarzwälder (14 October 1919 – 11 September 2011) was a German historian. With his decades of work and his extensive publications, he has had a major influence on the research and communication of the History of the city of Bremen.

== Life ==
Schwarzwälder was born in Bremen. His younger brother was the Heimatforscher Harry Schwarzwälder (1929–2019). He attended the grammar school and graduated in 1938 with his Abitur. He was then called up for Reichsarbeitsdienst, then for military service with an air force and the anti-aircraft artillery. During the Second World War, he was first deployed in the Homeland Security, later in a technical department in the Soviet Union and in the West. Schwarzwälder had to spend several years as prisoner of war in camps in France, the US and England. In 1947, he was able to return to Bremen. In Ein Streifzug durch Bremens Geschichte, Online-Geschichtsprojekt auf www.-user.uni-bremen.de; retrieved 25 November 2020.

From 1948, he studied history, German, English and political science at the Philipps University of Marburg. In 1953, he passed his first Staatsexamen and obtained his doctorate in Marburg with the historical work Entstehung und Anfänge der Stadt Bremen. After his preparatory service and the Second Staatsexamen, he worked from 1955 as Assessor and Studienrat at the Oberschule am Leibnizplatz in the Bremen Neustadt. In 1960, he was appointed Professor of History at the then Pädagogische Hochschule Bremen, which was incorporated into the newly founded University of Bremen in 1971. Until 1988, Schwarzwälder taught there as a full university professor with the following main subjects: Landesgeschichte, Nazism era and the Hanseatic League.

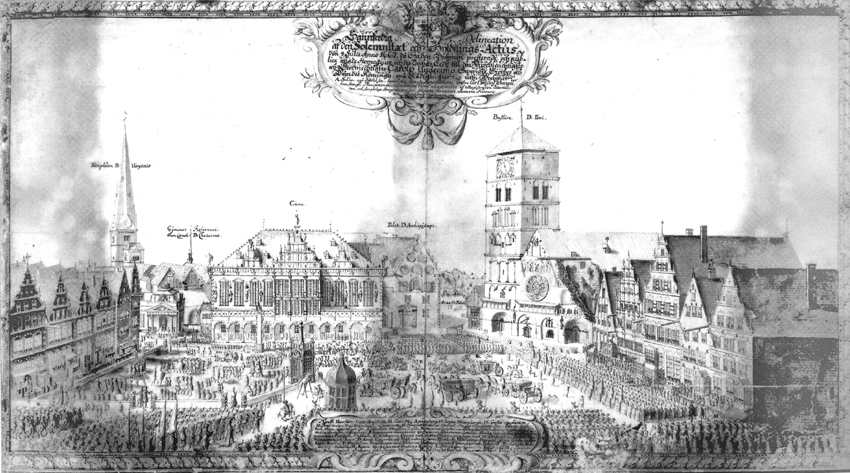
Homage of the city of Bremen to the Swedish imperial commander Wrangel according to the Treaty of Habenhausen (1666)- Contemporary testimony from Black Forest work Bremen in the 17th century.

Since 1953, Schwarzwälder's research focused on the history of the Free Hanseatic City of Bremen. He gave many lectures and published numerous publications on the contemporary and cultural history of Bremen and Northwest Germany as well as the Hanseatic League. In 1975 and 1985 his four-volume work on the History of the Free Hanseatic City of Bremen appeared, which has since become the standard work about the history of Bremen. After his retirement in 1988, he continued his research and publication work. In 2001, he published under the title Das Große Bremen-Lexikon the first coherent reference work on interesting and enigmatic things about and in the city-state of Bremen, which was described as "a treasure trove on the past and present of Bremen and Bremerhavens" and now also is considered a standard work.

Schwarzwälder died in Bremen at the age of 91.

== Publications ==
- Entstehung und Anfänge der Stadt Bremen. Carl Schünemann Verlag, Bremen 1955.
- Reise in Bremens Vergangenheit. Carl Schünemann Verlag, Bremen 1965.
- Die Machtergreifung der NSDAP in Bremen 1933. Carl Schünemann Verlag, Bremen 1966.
- Bremen und Nordwestdeutschland am Kriegsende 1945 (part I). Carl Schünemann Verlag, Bremen 1972, ISBN 3-7961-1546-2.
- Bremen und Nordwestdeutschland am Kriegsende 1945 (part II). Carl Schünemann Verlag, Bremen 1973, ISBN 3-7961-1620-5.
- Bremen im Wandel der Zeiten – Die Neustadt und ihre Vororte. Carl Schünemann Verlag, Bremen 1973, ISBN 3-7961-1654-X.
- Bremen und Nordwestdeutschland am Kriegsende 1945 (part III). Carl Schünemann Verlag, Bremen 1974, ISBN 3-7961-1650-7.
- Das Ende an der Unterweser 1945. Bremerhaven (Wesermünde) und Umgebung am Kriegsende. Stadtarchiv Bremerhaven, Bremerhaven 1974.
- Bremerhaven und seine Vorgängergemeinden / Ansichten, Pläne, Landkarten 1575 bis 1890. Stadtarchiv Bremerhaven, Bremerhaven 1977.
- with Otto Heuschele: Deutschland Album nach alten Ansichtskarten. Flechsig Verlag, Frankfurt 1980, ISBN 3-88189-109-9.
- Postkartenalbum Oberneuland, Horn / Lehe, Schwachhausen, Parkviertel, Bürgerpark. Carl Schünemann Verlag, Bremen 1981, ISBN 3-7961-1726-0.
- Berühmte Bremer. Paul List Verlag, Munich 1972, ISBN 3-471-78718-6.
- Bremen im Wandel der Zeiten – Die Altstadt. Carl Schünemann Verlag, Bremen 1985, ISBN 3-7961-1662-0.
- Blick auf Bremen. Ansichten, Vogelschauen vom 16.–19. Jahrhundert, Stadtpläne. Carl Schünemann Verlag, Bremen 1985, ISBN 3-7961-1759-7.
- Ansichten der Freien Hansestadt Bremen und ihrer Umgebungen. Carl Schünemann Verlag, Bremen 1985, ISBN 3-7961-1688-4.
- Reisen und Reisende in Nordwestdeutschland, Vol. 1 (bis 1620). Lax Verlag, Hildesheim 1987, ISBN 3-7848-2421-8.
- Bremer Sehenswürdigkeiten einst und jetzt. Carl Schünemann Verlag, Bremen 1990, ISBN 3-7961-1807-0.
- Gruß aus Bremen. Ansichtskarten um die Jahrhundertwende. Flechsig Verlag, Frankfurt 1992, ISBN 3-87681-056-6.
- Reise in Bremens Vergangenheit. Stationen und Bilder einer 1200-jährigen Geschichte. Carl Schünemann Verlag, Bremen 1993, ISBN 3-7961-1777-5.
- Bremer Geschichte. Döll-Verlag, Bremen 1993, ISBN 3-88808-202-1.
- Bremen – Ein verlorenes Stadtbild. Wartberg-Verlag, Gudensberg-Gleichen 1994, ISBN 3-86134-173-5.
- Geschichte der Freien Hansestadt Bremen in fünf Bänden. Erweiterte und verbesserte Auflage. Edition Temmen, Bremen 1995, ISBN 3-86108-283-7.
  - Vol. 1: Von den Anfängen bis zur Franzosenzeit (1810).
  - Vol. 2: Von der Franzosenzeit bis zum Ersten Weltkrieg (1810–1918).
  - Vol. 3: Bremen in der Weimarer Republik (1918–1933).
  - Vol. 4: Bremen in der NS-Zeit (1933–1945).
  - Vol. 5: Bibliographie und Register.
- Gruß aus Bremen. Die Altstadt auf frühen Ansichtskarten. Edition Temmen, Bremen 1998, ISBN 3-86108-611-5.
- Das Große Bremen-Lexikon. Edition Temmen, Bremen 2003, ISBN 3-86108-693-X.
  - Vol. 1: A–K. 2., aktualisierte, überarbeitete und erweiterte Auflage. 2003.
  - Vol. 2: L–Z. 2., aktualisierte, überarbeitete und erweiterte Auflage. 2003.
  - Ergänzungs-Band. A–Z. 1st edition. 2008, ISBN 978-3-86108-986-5.
- Bremen in alten Reisebeschreibungen. Edition Temmen, Bremen 2006, ISBN 978-3-86108-550-8.
