= German Party (1993) =

German Party Deutsche Partei – Die Freiheitlichen
- Leader: Gerd-Uwe Dahlmann
- Founded: May 1993
- Headquarters: Hambühren
- Newspaper: Deutschland-Post
- Membership: c. 250 (2007)
- Ideology: National conservatism German nationalism Right-wing populism
- Political position: Right-wing
- Colours: Blue; Black, red and gold

Website
- deutsche-partei-dp.de

The German Party (German: Deutsche Partei, DP) is a minor national conservative German political party. It sees itself as the successor of the defunct conservative German-Hanoverian Party and the German Party established in 1947, which was represented in the Bundestag parliament until 1961.

== History ==
The defunct German Party had continued to exist as an association, but it was re-founded as a political party at Kassel in May 1993; the party has since worked with other right-wing parties such as the national liberal Bund freier Bürger (BFB). The new party was led by Johannes Freiherr von Campenhausen until 2001 when the former FDP and BFB politician Heiner Kappel took his place. Upon the 2003 merger with the Freiheitliche Deutsche Volkspartei (FDVP), a far-right splinter group of the German People's Union (DVU) in the state of Saxony-Anhalt, it adopted the name affix Die Freiheitlichen referring to the Freedom Party of Austria and changed its course towards a more radical stance.

Kappel was deposed in January 2005 after attempting to agree an alliance with the national conservative Republicans and the German Social Union, even though the membership had supported working with the far-right DVU and the National Democratic Party (NPD). A joint leadership of Eberhard Lehmann, Claudia Wiechmann (former chair of the FDVP) and Ulrich Paetzold took over and demanded Kappel's exclusion, later Lehmann was sidelined in favour of a joint leadership. Kappel successfully filed a lawsuit against the new executive committee, but has not further interfered with the DP policies. The party has been investigated by the state's Offices for the Protection of the Constitution in Thuringia and Bavaria as possibly extreme right, with the conclusion made that contacts exist. A party convention in July 2007 elected Alfred Kuhlemann chairman and by resolution condemned the coup against Kappel.

As of 2007, the party is no longer monitored by the intelligence service. The DP currently defines itself as a conservative party. It produces a monthly newspaper, the Deutschland-Post. Some members have left to join the Republicans whilst co-operating with the far-right NPD.

== Results ==
The party has concentrated its efforts to achieve seats in the Landtage parliaments of Lower Saxony and Hesse, though to no avail. It currently has no representation at any major level, having only a small number of local seats in Saxony-Anhalt.

== See also ==
- Conservatism in Germany
