= Überfremdung =

German anti-foreign political term

Überfremdung (pronounced [ˌyːbɐˈfʁɛmdʊŋ]), literally 'over-foreignization', is a German-language term used to refer to either a perceived excess of immigration, or the making of something out to be more alien than it actually is — i.e., intentional or active alienation. The word is a nominalization compounded from über meaning 'over' or 'overly' and fremd meaning 'foreign'. In that alienation also translates to "Entfremdung", there exists at least one other political dimension to this term as well though.

== Overview ==
The term is colloquially applied to various processes, but is nowhere precisely defined. As a buzzword, it is intended to characterize external influences as “alien,” “excessive,” and threatening, and thus to devalue them.

The Duden shows its change in meaning: it first listed the noun in 1929 and explained it economically as the “absorption of too much foreign capital.” In 1934, “infiltration of foreign races” was added, and in 1941 “infiltration of foreign Volkstum (ethnicity/national character).” From 1956 onward, “foreigners” replaced the term “foreign races.” “Foreign Volkstum” continued to be listed. An example given was: “a country is over-foreignized.” Only in 1958 were the qualifiers from 1934 removed. Since 1991, the verb “überfremden” has been defined in the spelling dictionary as “to permeate with foreign influences, for a foreign influence to become dominant in something.” Since 1993, the noun has been explained with the example: “the fear of over-foreignization (of the presence of too many foreigners living here permanently) is unfounded.”

Only in Wirtschaftswissenschaft (economics) does the term serve as a Fachterminus (technical term). Some Sprachpflegers (language purists) use it to criticize anglicisms. Right-wing extremists in particular use it as a polemical term to portray religious, ethnic, racial, or cultural Minderheiten (minorities) as a threat to the “native population,” their culture, and/or nation. They associate it with political demands for exclusion. This usage originates in the ideology of Volkstum and the völkisch movement of the 19th century in German-speaking countries. However, Populists and democratic actors also sometimes use the term in debates about Ausländerpolitik (policy toward foreigners), migration, integration, and asylum law.

The Gesellschaft für deutsche Sprache (GfdS) chose “Überfremdung” as the German Unword of the Year in 1993, giving the following justification:

The decisive factor for the criticism of this word, which at first glance appears harmless, was the finding that ‘Überfremdung’ continues to be used in the sense of a racist reinterpretation […] ‘Überfremdung’ became a slogan used in casual pub talk that is intended to provide even the most undifferentiated Fremdenfeindlichkeit (xenophobia) with ‘argumentative’ support.

Linguistics, as well as literary, political, and social sciences, also criticize the term because of its vagueness, its use in the Sprache des Nationalsozialismus (language of National Socialism), and its continuing negative Konnotation (connotation) as a key term for stirring up sentiment.

The word is related to terms in various languages: foreign infiltration, foreign penetration, French surpopulation étrangère, déculturation, envahissement par des étrangers, Spanish extranjerización, Italian infiltrazione straniera, and הסתננות מאפריקה לישראל (Hebrew for 'infiltration from Africa to Israel'), which have all been used at various times to rally xenophobic sentiment.

== Political usage ==
=== Germany ===
==== Imperial era ====
Even before the founding of the German Empire, German nationalists such as Ernst Moritz Arndt had polemizised against immigration from Eastern Europe and warned of a “flood” of foreigners and their culture, especially Jews. From 1871 onward, these arguments increasingly drew on patterns of pseudoscientific racism. Even where this was rejected, the own people was often viewed as a collective that, in the sense of Social Darwinism, had to assert itself aggressively against other “ethnic groups” both internally and externally and to enforce the assimilation of minorities.

A clear sign of the spread of this attitude in bourgeois and academic circles was the Berlin Antisemitism Dispute. In his essay “Our Prospects” (“Unsere Aussichten”), Heinrich von Treitschke spoke of the “foreign ethnicity” of a Polish “tribe of Jews”, which stood “much more alien to the European and especially the Germanic nature” than other minorities. Many naturalized Jews were also “German-speaking Orientals”. They allegedly misused their dominance over the press to defame Christianity and patriotism. “Semitism” bore “heavy co-responsibility” for the “brazen greed of the founding-era swindle” and for the “shabby materialism of our time”. “The Jew who sells out his neighbours through usury” sat in “thousands of German villages”. The antisemitic movement of the time was a “natural reaction of the Germanic national feeling against a foreign element”. Because German national feeling was underdeveloped, “we were therefore so long defenceless against foreign influence”. Judaism, as a confession, must never be placed on equal footing with Christianity. The religious Jews’ adherence to the biblical idea of being the chosen people was a form of “racial arrogance”. Only their adaptation to Germanness could permanently prevent their expulsion. In doing so, Treitschke called into question the recently achieved Jewish emancipation and made antisemitism—previously largely despised in bourgeois society—socially acceptable.

From 1879, and especially from 1893 onward, several specially founded parties, associations, and clubs represented antisemitic propaganda about “overforeignization”. At the beginning of the First World War, this initially receded behind common patriotism. The imperial government brought foreign forced labourers, including about 35,000 Eastern European Jews, to Germany for its armaments industry. From then on, antisemitic groups intensified their agitation against “Jewish overforeignization”, also in order to target Jews who had long since assimilated into German society.

In the German Empire, nation-building was promoted from the 1870s onward, and the Catholic Poles, who formed the largest minority in the eastern provinces, were subjected to a policy of Germanisation. In German self-perception, Germans were considered industrious, culturally superior to Poles, and civilized, while Poles served as a negative contrast. In 1885, regulations were introduced in Prussia for the expulsion of Poles. Between 30,000 and 40,000 Poles, including Jews, were expelled from four Prussian provinces. The influx of Polish workers into the eastern provinces was a consequence of the migration of Germans and inland Poles to the western industrial cities of the kingdom. In total, 400,000 Poles from the Prussian-occupied territories migrated to the West. The ban on Polish immigration was lifted after just five years, due to consideration for East Elbian landowners who depended on cheap labour. In the West, official pressure and social exclusion ultimately did not lead to the intended isolation of Polish miners and industrial workers. On the contrary, the repression, which was accompanied by professional emancipation, led to increased integration of the one-third of Poles who remained in the country.

==== Weimar Republic ====
This tendency continued in the Weimar Republic and became more radical. The church historian Wolfgang Gerlach pointed out how especially bourgeois parties such as the DNVP and the media used immigration of Ostjuden (Eastern European Jews) after 1918 against all already assimilated local Jews. Of 250 ministers in the Weimar Republic, only four were Jewish:

Therefore it must be asked today whether terms such as ‘overpowering’ or ‘overforeignisation’ really had a purely descriptive function, or whether they did not rather serve an agitational purpose, namely to inject an element of unease into the discussion of the so-called Jewish question. And thus the antisemites gathering politically in the NSDAP succeeded in reversing their own ‘inferiority’ into the posture of the stronger party, by declaring the Jewish ‘superman’ they had invented to be an ‘Untermensch’ (subhuman). Such ideas were later also adopted by the German Christians.

— Wolfgang Gerlach, As the Witnesses Fell Silent. The Confessing Church and the Jews. 2nd edition 1993, pp. 26f.

The German Academic Association adopted in 1925 unanimously a motion stating:

A barrier must be placed against the overforeignization of German universities by Jewish teachers and students. No further teachers of Jewish descent are to be appointed. For students, a numerus clausus is to be introduced.

— Notker Hammerstein, Antisemitism and German Universities 1871–1933. 1995, p. 88.

German Volk studies, especially Ostforschung (research on the East) and Volks- und Kulturbodenforschung (folk and cultural land research), understood itself from the 1920s onward as a “fighting science” committed to Germanness (“Deutschtum”) (Werner Conze, Theodor Schieder, Walter Frank). It now attempted to establish “overforeignization” as a scientific concept. In doing so, processes of integration and assimilation were portrayed as dangers that could lead to a “Umvolkung” (ethnic replacement) of German “ethnic groups”. For this purpose, concepts such as “Volksgemeinschaft” (people’s community), “Lebensraum” (living space), “cultural space”, “customs” or “culture/civility” were developed, which were to be protected against “overforeignization”.

The re-establishment of the Polish state was the visible sign of the loss of some East Prussian provinces as well as the end of the German Empire and the Prussian kingdom. Not only völkisch movements, which after 1920 demanded German labourers instead of Polish workers and organised associations as well as travel and accommodation for mostly young volunteers, but also the government under the Centre Party politician Heinrich Brüning planned to prevent an alleged Polonisation through the settlement of German small farmers in the eastern territories.

The word appeared for the first time in the Duden dictionary in 1929 and was later popularised by Joseph Goebbels.

==== Era of National Socialism ====
The NSDAP made the defence against an alleged Jewish and foreign “overforeignization” a central goal from the very beginning. Its 25-point programme of 1920 excluded Jews from the “German national community” (“Volksgemeinschaft”) from the outset. A foreigner law for all non-Germans, the expulsion of all foreigners in the event of supply crises, the dismissal of non-citizens from all public offices, etc., were adopted as party objectives. With retroactive effect to 2 August 1914, immigration of “non-Germans” was to be prohibited; i.e., all foreign workers recruited during the First World War were to be expelled.

Even during the Great Depression, when antisemitic propaganda was temporarily reduced by order of the party leadership, the rhetoric of overforeignization remained active, now more strongly combined with anti-capitalist references.

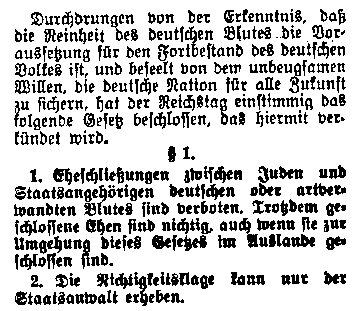
Introduction and § 1 of the “Blood Protection Law” of the Nuremberg Laws of 1935

Immediately after the seizure of power, the Nazi regime began to exclude Jews from professional and social life using all available means of power. This applied especially to the fields of science, art, and culture: in 1933, Joseph Goebbels spoke of an “overforeignization of German intellectual life by Jewry” and thereby gave the term its degrading and simultaneously militant character. The term was now consistently interpreted and propagated in racial terms as a mixing with “alien blood”: it meant a “too strong infiltration of non-German or alien elements into the German people”. The Nuremberg Laws of 1935 drew from this the political consequence of an apartheid-like system of separation between non-Jewish and Jewish Germans.

Nazi propaganda equated Judaism with Bolshevism, capitalism, and cultural decadence. In relation to art, music, architecture, etc., “overforeignization” was equated with “degeneration” (see Degenerate Art and Degenerate Music). From the beginning of the war in 1939, the National Socialists also referred to non-Jewish foreigners, especially Poles and Slavs, as “biologically based overforeignization”, in order to taboo unwanted contact with prisoners of war and forced labourers.

==== Federal Republic of Germany ====
===== 20th century =====
In the postwar period, the term played hardly any role due to the public rejection of inhuman ideologies from the Nazi era and the admission of millions of East German refugees into West Germany. A more in-depth confrontation with völkisch ideology only began with the Student Movement of the 1960s.

With the founding of the NPD in 1964, the term reappeared in political debates—always in an anti-immigration context, for example as opposition to guest workers with the demand “German jobs for Germans only” (1965). After a temporary decline, the NPD attempted in 1980 to draw attention with citizens’ initiatives for an “end to foreign infiltration” (“Ausländerstopp”).

University lecturers also adopted such demands: On 17 June 1981, the authors Helmut Schröcke, then a consultant for right-wing extremist groups and in the same year founder of the Schutzbund für das Deutsche Volk, and Theodor Schmidt-Kaler published the Heidelberg Manifesto, signed by 15 professors. The original version stated:

With great concern we observe the infiltration of the German people through the influx of many millions of foreigners and their families, the overforeignization of our language, our culture, and our nationality. […] Peoples are (biologically and cybernetically) living systems of a higher order with different system properties, which are passed on genetically and through traditions. The integration of large masses of non-German foreigners is therefore not possible while preserving our people and leads to the known ethnic catastrophes of multicultural societies. Every people, including the German people, has a natural right to preserve its identity and distinctiveness in its living area. Respect for other peoples requires their preservation, not their assimilation (“Germanisation”).

After strong protests and counter-statements by other professors, the manifesto was slightly moderated, without revising its core völkisch theses. Schröcke and some other signatories subsequently withdrew their signatures.

On 29 January 1989, the party Die Republikaner achieved 7.5% of the vote in the election to the Berlin House of Representatives, entering a state parliament for the first time. Its campaign focused on the theme of “overforeignization”. In a campaign video, they depicted a future Berlin inhabited exclusively by Turkish citizens.

The rhetoric of “overforeignization” is today a standard motif in European far-right politics. Alongside antisemitism and historical revisionism, it forms a central pillar of far-right ideologies. Its theoretical basis is often ethnopluralism, which claims to preserve the distinctiveness of different peoples and from which demands such as the abolition of the asylum law and policies of deportation or expulsion are derived. These goals are also pursued by attempts at unifying the German far-right, such as the German League for People and Homeland.

In August 1997, a 25-page pamphlet was published in Dresden titled “Appeal to all Germans for self-defence against overforeignization – The genocide of the German people.” It stated:

We, the signatories, call on all nationally minded Germans to self-defence against the officially planned and brutally implemented genocide of the German people by the state leadership.

The signatories included Helmut Fleck, Udo Pastörs, Rigolf Hennig and Emil Schlee.

It was claimed that people were experiencing daily “steps of brainwashing, all of which were intended to systematically replace the German people […] with foreign peoples”. The asylum law allegedly allowed “a flood of people that will subdue and destroy us” to enter and served “ultimately the factual enslavement of the Germans”. The legal right of foreigners to asylum was therefore to be “abolished immediately”:

Recognition of asylum is to be placed immediately under the sole decision of the German people […] The old recruitment treaties for guest workers are now to be applied. This means that all guest workers and their families are to be sent back to their home countries.

This was combined with the antisemitic stereotype of a Jewish world conspiracy: the “policy of overforeignization” was said to have reached its peak with the “secret treaty Kohl–Galinski”—referring to an agreement between the federal government and Russia intended to facilitate immigration for Russian Germans and Russian Jews:

We cautiously estimate that several million Jews will immigrate to Germany if we do not prevent it. This treaty is illegal, immoral and inhumane: it is outrageous, because it must lead to war in Germany, and it will turn Germany into a second Palestine.

This manifesto was signed by 65 well-known right-wing extremists, including Saxon NPD leader Udo Pastörs, Schröcke, and others, and distributed nationwide to schools and individuals by right-wing extremist organisations such as the German Reich People’s League (VBDR) and the Witikobund. An investigation by the Federal Criminal Police Office on suspicion of incitement to hatred was closed without result in 1999.

In political debates on the asylum compromise (1993), dual citizenship (1999), and the green card (2000), the CDU also at times used slogans such as “the boat is full” or “children instead of Indians” (Jürgen Rüttgers, 2000). The CDU politician Heinrich Lummer wrote in 1997:

Germany is being taken away from the Germans. Whether one calls it land seizure, overforeignization, or subversion makes no difference.

In 1993, the Gesellschaft für deutsche Sprache (German for 'Society for the German Language') declared Überfremdung to be the Unwort des Jahres (German for 'Un-Word of the Year'), as it makes "undifferentiated xenophobia" sound more argumentative and clinical.

Linguists, philologists, political scientists and social scientists criticise the concept for its vagueness, its use under national socialism, and its continuing negative connotation.

==== 21st century ====
Economists also warn about “overforeignization” in the sense of potential social conflict between natives and immigrants. With regard to trends of an ageing society, for example, Klaus F. Zimmermann, president of the German Institute for Economic Research (DIW), stated in 2003:

Wollten wir die demographischen Ausfälle allein durch Migration ersetzen, haben wir in dreißig Jahren eine Überfremdung, die wahrscheinlich sozial nicht funktionieren wird.

If we wanted to replace demographic losses solely through migration, in thirty years we would have an overforeignization that would probably not function socially.

— Klaus F. Zimmermann

According to a survey conducted on behalf of the University of Leipzig in 2004, 37.7 percent of Germans in both East and West agreed with the statement: “The Federal Republic is at a dangerous level of overforeignization due to the many foreigners.”

Oskar Lafontaine warned during the 2005 election campaign for the WASG about foreign workers allegedly taking jobs from family fathers and women by offering “low wages”. Such use of fear of foreigners is regularly criticised by competing parties, as well as by the media and even supporters.

Since autumn 2014, thousands have been demonstrating with PEGIDA against an alleged overforeignization of the country. National Socialists and their modern followers use the term polemically to describe a “too strong influx of non-Germans or alien races into the German people”.

PEGIDA supporters also claim “overforeignization”, as stated in the subtitle of a propaganda clip on YouTube and on banners. “In 1993, ‘overforeignization’ was even chosen as the Unword of the Year, the term has […] persisted,” said Andrea Ewels, managing director of the German Language Society (GfdS), in 2015, adding: “Today, however, it is often used to refer to other minorities, such as refugees from Muslim countries.”

=== Austria ===
In Austria, far-right groups only began to increasingly reuse terms such as “overforeignization” and “ethnic reorganisation” from the 1970s onward, terms historically burdened by National Socialism. At first, these were applied to guest workers; after the fall of the “Iron Curtain” in 1989, Austria’s accession to the EU in 1995, and the 2004 European Union enlargement, they were increasingly directed against alleged “mass immigration” from Eastern Europe. More recently, the “threat of Islamisation” has become a fixed component of this rhetoric.

Warnings about such alleged dangers continue today—just as before 1945—to assert that Austrians are part of a “German national and cultural community”. Groups defined as “foreign”, such as guest workers, Jews, asylum seekers, or immigrants, are thereby portrayed as endangering the “German identity” of the majority population.

==== NDP and the extreme right ====
In 1967, Norbert Burger, former federal chairman of the Ring of Liberal Students and activist in the South Tyrol Liberation Committee, founded the National Democratic Party (NDP) in Austria. In addition to calling for the Anschluss of Austria to Germany, it primarily demanded the “return” of guest workers in order to prevent the alleged “overforeignization” and “biological infiltration” of Austria. It complained about “processes of denationalisation” and the “de-Germanisation of German people” as being just as serious a crime as the Germanisation of non-Germans.

In 1974, the NDP federal assembly decided to organise an “anti-guest worker referendum”, which ultimately did not materialise. Party supporters distributed leaflets demanding: “Foreign workers out!” When Burger ran as the NDP candidate in the 1980 Austrian presidential election, his slogan was: “Against overforeignization – for a German Austria!”.

In 1982, the NDP again attempted to launch a “referendum for the protection of Austria against overforeignization and infiltration”, which also failed. In 1988, the Constitutional Court of Austria applied the Prohibition Act of 1947 against the NDP and revoked its legal status as a political party, citing Article 9 of the Austrian State Treaty (dissolution of Nazi organizations). The court found that the NDP programme was based on a “biologically racist concept of the people” and that its “pan-German propaganda” coincided in core elements with the goals of the NSDAP.

The citizens’ initiative supporting the NDP referendum also included the Action New Right (ANR) and the “Anti-Foreigner Movement” (“Volksbewegung gegen Überfremdung”), led by Gerd Honsik. It emerged from the Brotherhood of Babenberg, which had been banned in 1980. Honsik and other representatives of this movement attempted to run in the 1990 Austrian parliamentary elections under the list “No to the Foreigners’ Flood” (NA). The electoral authority rejected the list, citing statements such as “child poverty and overforeignization are the pincers that threaten to destroy our identity” and “overforeignization is genocide”.

The NA subsequently challenged the decision; its complaint was rejected by the Constitutional Court in 1991. The ruling stated that there was a “substantial identification with a particularly important National Socialist programme point and […] a revival of a political demand characteristic of the NSDAP with similar propaganda vocabulary”, reflected in the “frequent use of words that clearly indicate a racially motivated attitude”. As an example, the term “overforeignization policy” was cited.

Honsik was convicted in Germany in 1990 for incitement to hatred, and in 1992 for Holocaust denial; in Austria he was convicted in 1992 for neo-Nazi activity. Also part of his movement was Gottfried Küssel, who was likewise convicted in 1993 for neo-Nazi activity. He had founded the “Volksstreue Extra-Parliamentary Opposition” (VAPO), which periodically published the magazine *Halt* (“Stop”), subtitled “Democratic weapon against foreign infiltration” and “wall newspaper of the Austrian defensive struggle”. Racial agitation against foreigners, demands for Austria’s annexation to Germany, and Holocaust denial were central themes. It was claimed that politics was depriving Austrians of their right to preserve “racial and ethnic purity”, and that due to the “infiltration of our people” native Austrians were on a “death march” (*Halt*, 53/1990). In 1991, one article headline read: “Auctioning of pollution: Greens plan import of Jews!”.

=== Switzerland ===
==== Before 1945 ====
In Switzerland, the proportion of foreigners has traditionally been high. It reached around 15 percent of the total population by 1920; at the same time, restrictive legislation made their naturalization more difficult.

Around 1900, political leaders began warning of the perceived danger of overforeignization, while also opposing German hegemonic ambitions. During the First World War, the previously liberal immigration policy was replaced by a restrictive one: in 1914, the Federal Department of Foreign Affairs took measures against illegal immigration. In 1917, a central foreign police authority was established.

From the 1920s onward, the term became part of Switzerland’s established political discourse and “cultural code” (Shulamit Volkov). It was also used in official language:

Bei der Beurteilung von Bewilligungsgesuchen sind die geistigen und wirtschaftlichen Interessen, der Grad der Überfremdung und die Lage des Arbeitsmarktes zu berücksichtigen.

When assessing applications for permits, the intellectual and economic interests, the degree of over-foreignization, and the situation of the labor market must be taken into account.

It was never precisely defined and could therefore gain broad acceptance in periods of social crisis, especially when the number of foreigners had already reached a postwar low. During the Great Depression, the economic crisis of the 1930s, the discourse on overforeignization experienced a new rise and also influenced Swiss federal authorities. The concept of “spiritual national defence” (“geistige Landesverteidigung”) protected Swiss society to some extent from the ideologies of National Socialism, fascism, and Stalinism, which were likewise rejected as foreign.

As in Germany, Eastern European Jews in particular were seen as backward, barely integrable, and therefore the greatest threat of overforeignization. In 1926, the foreign police issued a directive providing for the rejection of Polish and Galician Jews at the border. In 1938, fears of a flood of Jewish refugees from neighboring Germany caused the Swiss government to put pressure on the Nazi regime to introduce a "J" stamp on the passports of German Jews, in order to make it easier to hinder their emigration to Switzerland.

From the 1930s onward, authorities increasingly stopped speaking specifically of Jews and instead used the general term “foreigners”. J. Picard explains this as a tabooization of German developments of the time: the aim was to conceal attempts to keep Jews out of Switzerland in order not to appear antisemitic. Picard calls this a “Swissification of antisemitism”, while Rieder refers to it as “preventive antisemitism”.

==== After 1945 ====
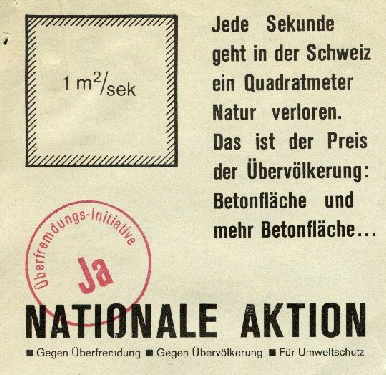
Overforeignization and environmental protection from the perspective of the “National Action”

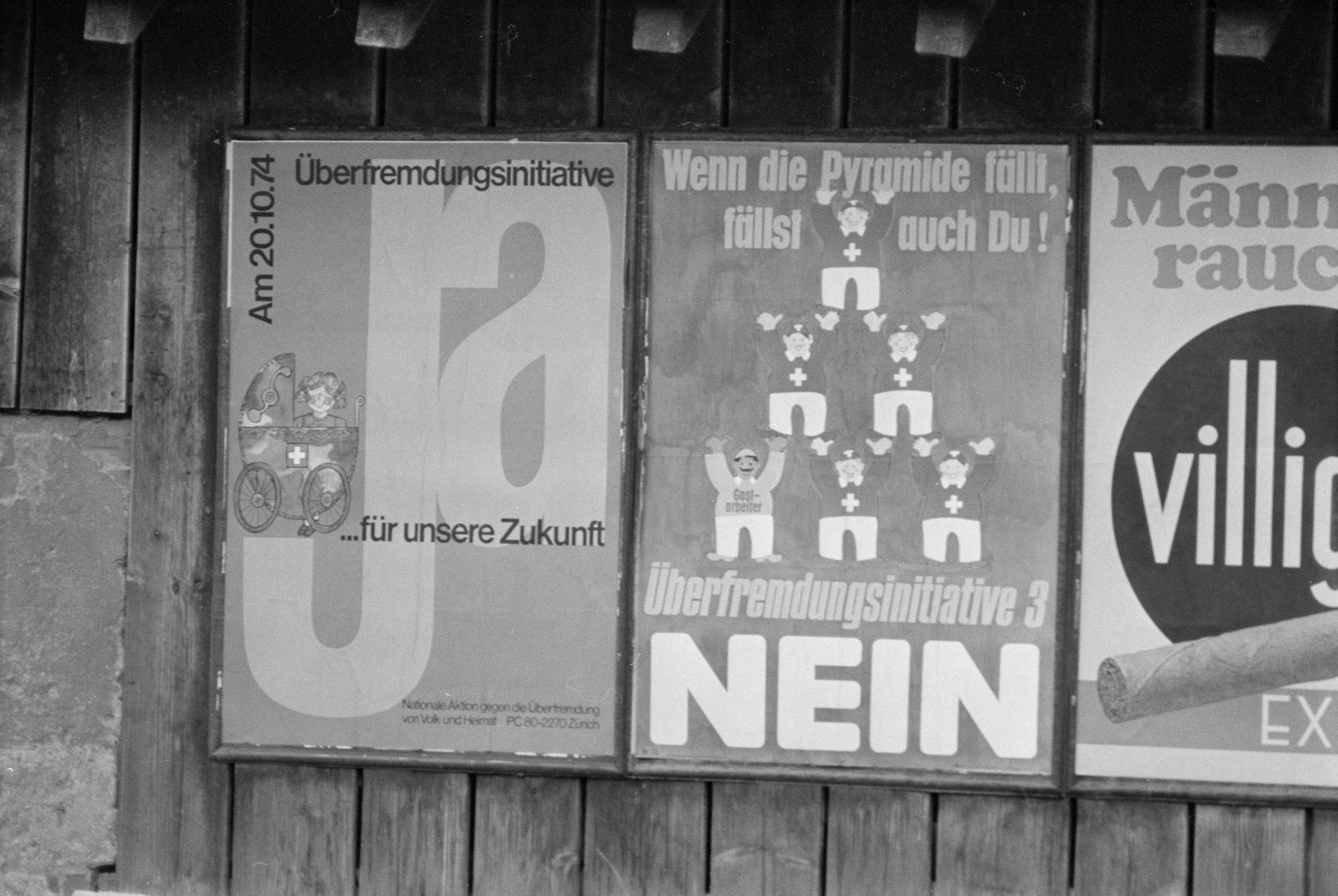
Campaign posters for and against the 1974 referendum on the overforeignization initiative

The economic boom in Switzerland in the 1950s required foreign labour. After the end of the post-war economic expansion, voices once again increased warning of overforeignization: first from the left and trade union circles, and only later did populist parties organise around it.

In 1961, the “National Action against the Overforeignization of People and Homeland” was founded, aiming to drastically reduce the proportion of foreigners. Its popular initiatives against “overforeignization” in the 1970s achieved up to 46 percent voter support. After splitting (1971) and later reunification (1990) with the Swiss Republicans, the party renamed itself the Swiss Democrats.

In 1964, a federal study commission stated that Switzerland was in a state of pronounced danger of overforeignization. For anti-immigration circles, overforeignization had already been reached, and they demanded increased deportations and expulsions of foreigners. On 10 August 1964, Switzerland and Italy signed an agreement on Italian migration to the Confederation, regulating employment conditions and especially family reunification rights. The treatment of Italian workers was brought largely into line with that of Swiss workers. This provoked strong protests among parts of the Swiss population.

One of the few intellectuals who supported the agreement was Max Frisch, who on this occasion wrote one of his most famous sentences: “We called for labour, and people came.”

By the end of the 1960s, referendums and public debates had made overforeignization a central issue of national politics. In 1970, the famous Schwarzenbach Initiative was held, which was rejected by both voters and cantons on 7 June, “relatively narrowly, but clearly”. In 1971, the National Action achieved significant gains in the federal elections.

Further overforeignization initiatives attracted high voter turnout but were all rejected. The discourse of “spiritual national defence” from the 1930s and 1940s was continued and reframed into a question of integration. Discussions now focused on Swiss identity and historical and state myths. National distinctiveness was presented as the main foundation of state independence and democracy. Ethnopluralist thinking also emerged: assimilation of foreign cultural groups was generally considered unlikely to succeed.

In 1982, the National Action narrowly won the referendum on the new Foreigners Act. In the following years, the party repeatedly achieved successes in referendums, including in opposition to easier naturalisation of foreigners and in asylum policy.

In the 1980s, overforeignization remained a key slogan, but the focus shifted from immigration policy to asylum policy. The economic crisis led to new distinctions between “real” and “fake” asylum seekers, and between economic and political refugees. The discourse on overforeignization developed four main dimensions: demographic immigration and displacement, environmental burden on the ecosystem, social value crisis, loss of political sovereignty.

Fears were raised about demographic displacement through uncontrolled immigration and the alleged extinction of the Swiss population. This was linked to environmental and spatial concerns. The perceived value crisis was also attributed to overforeignization, and populist circles predicted a loss of sovereignty through accession to the European Union, the United Nations, and globalization. One representative of this thinking is psychiatrist Jean-Jacques Hegg, who combines eugenic, anti-globalist, and ecological ideas in his book Bioethics.

The term Secondo (masculine) / Seconda (feminine) has been used in Switzerland since the late 20th century to refer to children of immigrants or naturalised migrants. The term is generally positive and is often used by those it describes themselves.

== See also ==
- Xenophobia
- Aporophobia
- Nativism
- LTI - Lingua Tertii Imperii
- James Schwarzenbach
- Illegal immigration from Africa to Israel
- Great Replacement conspiracy theory
