= Pro-movement =

German far-right movement

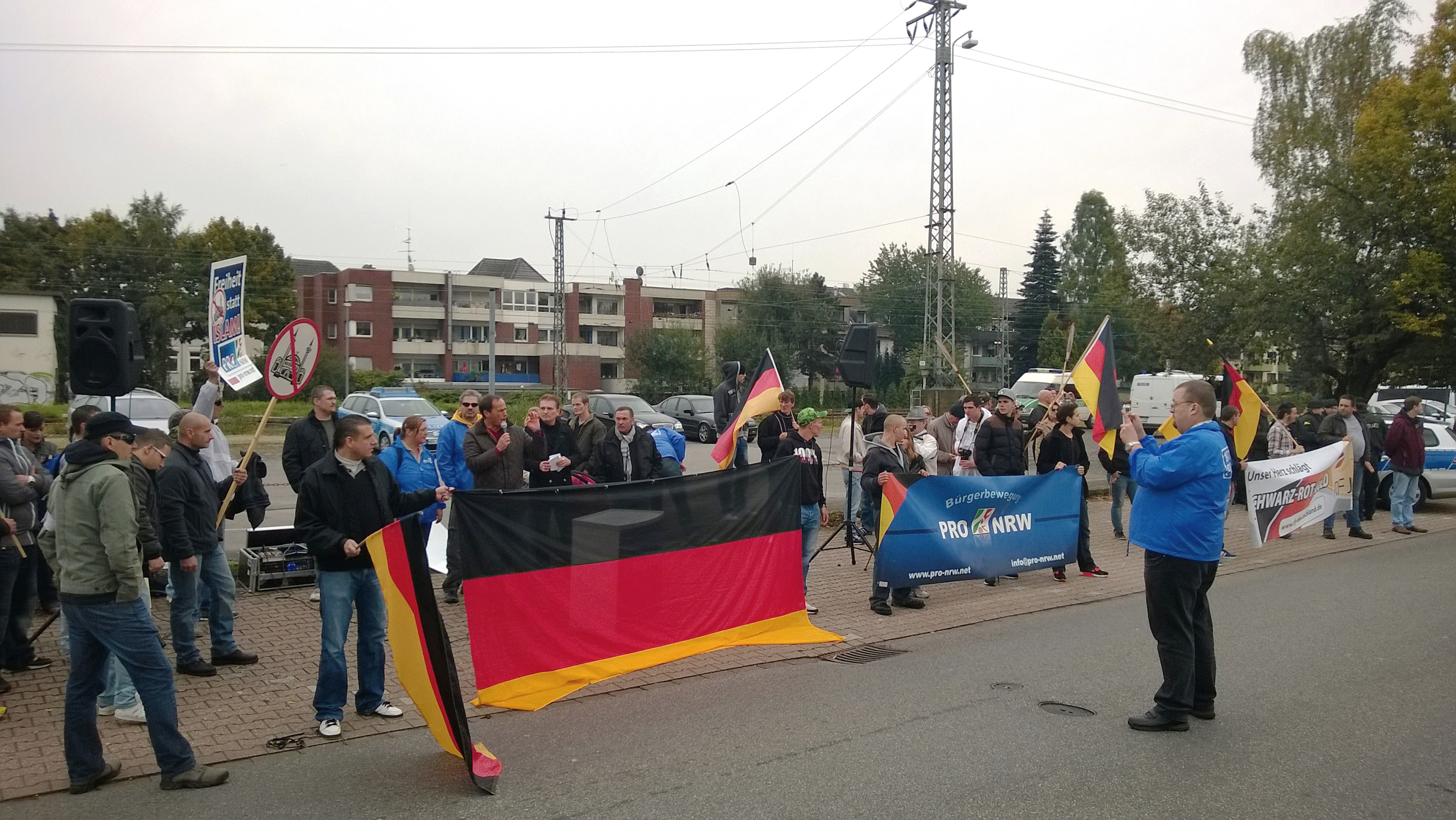
Pro NRW demo on 12 October 2013, in Rheydt, opposite the ar-Rahman Mosque

The pro-movement (German: Pro-Bewegung) or the pro-parties (pro-parteien) was understood to be a conglomerate of parties, voter associations and associations in Germany that were de jure independent, but de facto closely intertwined with one another in terms of personnel, organization and program. The pro-Cologne association and the pro-NRW and pro-Germany parties acted as central organizations. After the self-dissolution of pro Germany and pro Cologne in 2017 and 2018 and the conversion of pro NRW into an association in 2019, the activities of the pro movement were largely discontinued. However, there are still a few local groups such as the Pro Chemnitz citizens' movement.

Social scientists and constitutional protection authorities classified the pro-movement as far right and anti-constitutional. In self-descriptions, it described itself as right-wing populist, conservative or “liberal” and oriented towards other right-wing populist parties in Europe such as the FPÖ in Austria or the Vlaams Belang in Belgium, with which there was also official cooperation. In 2012, parts of the pro-movement also became the target of investigations against the neo-Nazi comradeship “Freundeskreis Rade”.

In terms of content, the pro-movement made a name for itself primarily by stoking fears and resentment towards Muslim migrants. This is followed by the rejection of the multicultural society and the warning against alleged “Islamization” and “foreign infiltration”. Other focal points included the demand for a zero-tolerance policy in domestic politics, a commitment to the “Christian West” and the fight against “cliques and corruption”.

The number of members, activists and supporters of the pro-movement was not exactly known. Official figures were only available to a limited extent due to the highly decentralized organizational structure and the pro-parties themselves have been shown to provide false membership figures in their press releases. The Federal Office for the Protection of the Constitution of North Rhine-Westphalia estimated the number of members of pro Cologne, pro NRW and pro Germany in 2015 at around 800. In 2018, the number of pro NRW party members was given as 400.

== History ==
The so-called pro movement emerged in 1996 with the founding of the Citizens' Movement for Cologne voters' community. According to the sociologist Alexander Häusler from the Neo-Nazism Department at the Düsseldorf University of Applied Sciences, the term “citizens' movement” is misleading because the members are not made up of citizens who became politically active for a specific reason or goal, but rather from the failed right-wing extremist collective movement German League for People and Homeland (DLVH). Häusler is one of the first scientists to systematically study and publish about the pro-movement.

A large number of the members and the majority of the officials were also active in the DVU, the Republicans and the NPD in the past. For example, Markus Beisicht (chairman of the citizens' movement for North Rhine-Westphalia and the pro-umbrella organization as well as former chairman of the citizens' movement for Cologne) was formerly state chairman of the DLVH in North Rhine-Westphalia and a member of the federal executive board of the Republicans. Manfred Rouhs (chairman of the pro-German citizens' movement and deputy chairman of the pro-umbrella organization) was also a former official of the DLVH and the NPD.

Until 2005, the activities and sphere of influence remained limited to the city of Cologne, although the leadership cadres maintained their contacts with the extreme right-wing milieu, most of which had their roots from the time before pro Cologne was founded. In 2005 the citizens' movement for Germany was founded. In 2006, the citizens' movement for Munich and the citizens' movement for Heilbronn were formed, which are an independent association, but the majority of their members are also members of pro Germany. In 2007, almost all members of pro Cologne founded the Citizens' Movement for North Rhine-Westphalia (Pro NRW) party. In addition, the citizens' movement for Baden-Württemberg was founded.

After initial electoral successes in the local elections in Cologne in 2004 and in some other municipalities in North Rhine-Westphalia in 2009, other smaller associations were founded under the name “Pro”. But not all of them had a direct connection with pro-NRW or pro-Germany. Nevertheless, there were always attempts, especially by Markus Beisicht and Manfred Rouhs, to integrate newly founded pro clubs. In some cases, however, the clubs distanced themselves from the pro movement. The year before (2008), the pro movement became known nationwide for the first time after pro Cologne and pro NRW held a controversial “anti-Islamization congress” in Cologne with around 100 participants. This was opposed by 40,000 counter-demonstrators.

In 2010, an official cooperation with the Republican party began. However, it ended after the Republicans ran against Pro Germany in both the 2013 federal election and against Pro NRW in the 2014 European election. Also in 2010, the pro movement first attracted attention in East Germany with the commitment of Arnstadt mayor Hans-Christian Köllmer (Pro Arnstadt) to pro-Germany and his reaction to critical voices.

In September 2012, the pro movement was reported internationally for the first time after pro Germany announced that it wanted to show the anti-Islam film Innocence of Muslims in Berlin. The announcement led to protests around the world in which several people were killed. Politicians from all parties spoke out against the action and called for civil society engagement against the pro-movement.

In 2014 there was a split between pro-Cologne/pro-Germany and pro-NRW. According to the NRW Office for the Protection of the Constitution, there is “no profound ideological and content-related debate”. Rather, the dispute is about power within the party and the strategic question of whether one should continue to try to present itself as a bourgeois party.

=== National election results ===
9 May 2010	Landtagswahl Nordrhein-Westfalen	Pro NRW	1.4 %
18 September 2011	Abgeordnetenhauswahl Berlin	Pro Deutschland	1.2 %
13 May 2012	Landtagswahl Nordrhein-Westfalen	Pro NRW	1.5 %
22 September 2013	Bundestagswahl	Pro Deutschland	0.2 %
25 Mai 2014	Europawahl	Pro NRW	0.2 %
31 August 2014	Landtagswahl Sachsen	Pro Deutschland	0.2 %
