= Emil Schlee =

German historian and politician (1922–2009)

Emil Schlee (21 October 1922 – 26 February 2009) was a German historian and politician with the CDU and REP. He was born in Schwerin and died in Schwentinental.

A noted history academic, Schlee had long called for the restoration of Germany to her 1937 borders, arguing that "if the heart of Europe is sick, then Europe can not be healthy and will not be healthy". Politically he first came to prominence as a spokesman for the expellees before serving as a member of the CDU. He left the party in 1985.

Joining the REP Schlee served as a Member of the European Parliament (MEP) from 1989 to 1994 for REP. Although he was not associated with the Harald Neubauer-Johanna Grund dissident faction he did clash with Franz Schönhuber as he opposed the leader's plans to co-operate with far right groups such as Front National and Vlaams Blok in the European Parliament. Ultimately Sclhee, party chairman in Schleswig-Holstein, stood against Schönhuber for the leadership of the party at the annual conference in Ruhstorf in 1990 but was defeated 179–376 with Neubauer's supporters storming out during the vote.
