= 1996 Baden-Württemberg state election =

State election in Germany

- 24 March 1996

All 155 seats in the Landtag of Baden-Württemberg 78 seats needed for a majority
- Turnout: 4,784,129 (67.6%) ▼2.5%
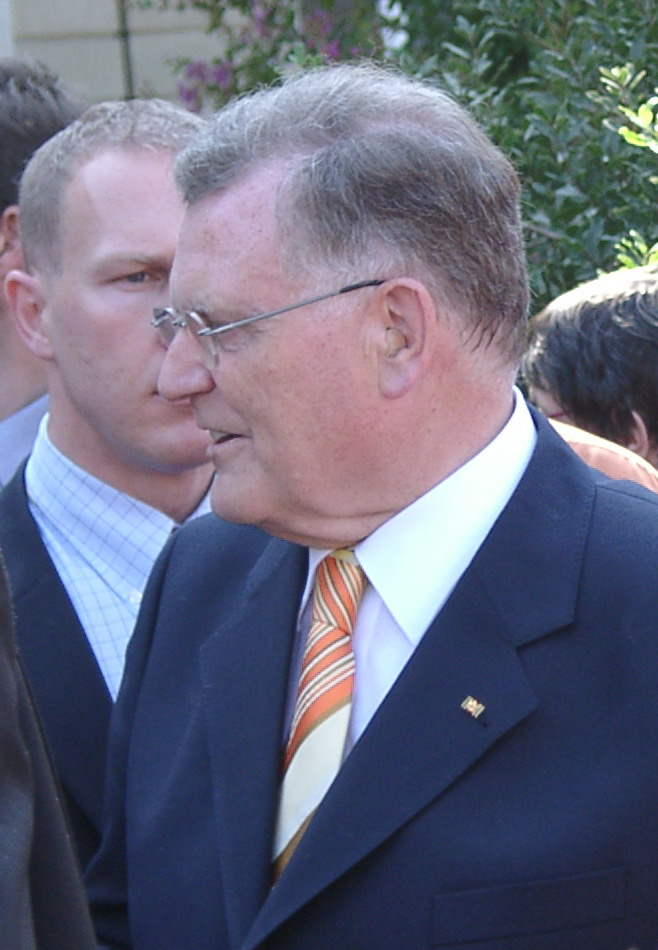

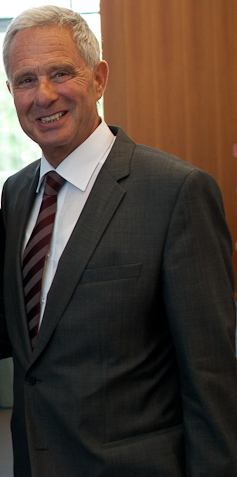

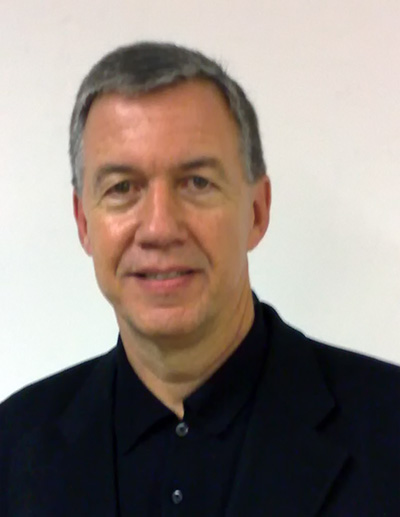
	First party	Second party	Third party
Leader	Erwin Teufel	Dieter Spöri
Party	CDU	SPD	Greens
Last election	64 seats, 39.6%	46 seats, 29.4%	13 seats, 9.5%
Seats won	69	39	19
Seat change	▲5	▼7	▲6
Popular vote	1,974,619	1,199,123	580,801
Percentage	41.3%	25.1%	12.1%
Swing	▲1.7%	▼4.3%	▲2.6%
	Fourth party	Fifth party
Leader	Walter Döring	Rolf Schlierer
Party	FDP	REP
Last election	8 seats, 5.9%	15 seats, 10.9%
Seats won	14	14
Seat change	▲6	▼1
Popular vote	458,478	437,228
Percentage	9.6%	9.1%
Swing	▲3.7%	▼1.8%
- Results for the single-member constituencies.
Minister-President before election
Erwin Teufel
CDU
Elected Minister-President
Erwin Teufel
CDU

The 1996 Baden-Württemberg state election was held on 24 March 1996 to elect the members of the 11th Landtag of Baden-Württemberg. The incumbent grand coalition government of the Christian Democratic Union (CDU) and Social Democratic Party (SPD) under Minister-President Erwin Teufel retained its majority. However, the CDU chose not to renew the coalition, instead forming a new government with the Free Democratic Party (FDP). Teufel was subsequently re-elected as Minister-President.

The Republicans unexpectedly retained their seats with a small swing against them, despite polling indicating they would fall out of the Landtag.

== Parties ==
The table below lists parties represented in the previous Landtag of Baden-Württemberg.

Name		Ideology	Leader(s)	1992 result	
Name		Ideology	Leader(s)	Votes (%)	Seats
CDU	Christian Democratic Union of Germany; Christlich Demokratische Union Deutschlands	Christian democracy	Erwin Teufel	39.6%	64 / 146
SPD	Social Democratic Party of Germany; Sozialdemokratische Partei Deutschlands	Social democracy	Dieter Spöri	29.4%	46 / 146
REP	The Republicans; Die Republikaner	German nationalism	Rolf Schlierer	10.9%	15 / 146
Grüne	Alliance 90/The Greens; Bündnis 90/Die Grünen	Green politics		9.5%	13 / 146
FDP	Free Democratic Party; Freie Demokratische Partei	Classical liberalism	Walter Döring	5.9%	8 / 146

== Opinion polling ==
Polling firm	Fieldwork date	Sample size	CDU	SPD	REP	Grüne	FDP	Others	Lead
1996 state election	24 Mar 1996	–	41.3	25.1	9.1	12.1	9.6	2.8	16.2
Infratest Burke	4–15 Mar 1996	1,508	42	30.5	4.5	14	6	3	11.5
Infratest Burke	1–8 Feb 1996	1,002	45	27	4	14	6	4	18
Infratest Burke	4–14 Jan 1996	1,003	43	26	4	17	6	4	17
Infratest Burke	9–17 Nov 1995	1,005	43	26	3	18	4	6	17
1992 state election	5 Apr 1992	–	39.6	29.4	10.9	9.5	5.9	4.8	10.2

== Results ==
Summary of the 24 March 1996 election results for the Landtag of Baden-Württemberg
Party	Votes	%	+/-	Seats	+/-	Seats %
Christian Democratic Union (CDU)	1,974,619	41.3	▲1.7	69	▲5	44.5
Social Democratic Party (SPD)	1,199,123	25.1	▼4.3	39	▼7	25.2
Alliance 90/The Greens (Grüne)	580,801	12.1	▲2.5	19	▲6	12.3
Free Democratic Party (FDP)	458,478	9.6	▲3.7	14	▲6	9.0
The Republicans (REP)	437,228	9.1	▼1.8	14	▼1	9.0
Ecological Democratic Party (ÖDP)	69,775	1.5	▼0.4	0	±0	0
Others	64,105	1.3		0	±0	0
Total	4,784,129	100.0		155	▲9	
Voter turnout		67.6	▼2.5			

Popular Vote
CDU	41.27%
SPD	25.06%
B'90/GRÜNE	12.14%
FDP	9.58%
REP	9.14%
Other	2.80%

Landtag seats
CDU	44.52%
SPD	25.16%
B'90/GRÜNE	12.26%
FDP	9.03%
REP	9.03%

== Sources ==
- Ergebnisse der Landtagswahlen in Baden-Württemberg 1996
