= Gerhard Krüger (politician) =

German Nazi Party student leader (1908–1994)

Personal details
- Born: 6 December 1908 Mottlau, Danzig, German Empire
- Died: 22 May 1994 (aged 85) Hesslingen, Hessisch Oldendorf, Germany
- Party: Sturmabteilung (1926-1928); Nazi Party (1928-?); Deutsche Reichspartei (1949); Socialist Reich Party (1949-1953); Deutsche Aufbaupartei (1953-?)
- Known for: Dissemination of Nazi and neo-Nazi propaganda

Gerhard Krüger (6 December 1908 – 22 May 1994) was a Nazi Party student leader and later a leading figure within the neo-Nazi movement.

== Early years ==
Krüger was born in Mottlau, Danzig. He first came to politics as a member of the Bund Oberland and it was from this basis that he was attracted to Nazism, joining the Sturmabteilung in 1926 and the Nazi Party itself in 1928. He became the leader of Nazi student groups at both the University of Leipzig and the University of Greifswald and in 1933 was appointed head of the Deutsche Studentenschaft.

== Nazi Party activity ==
Krüger's profile began to rise within the Nazi Party and in 1936 he was appointed to serve under Philipp Bouhler as ministerial leader of the Investigation Committee for the Protection of National Socialist Literature, a body that sought to ensure all published books conformed to Nazi ideology, with a special remit to examine books on economics. Around this time he also published two books, The Indestructible Reich and a biography of Adolf Hitler.

Krüger then entered the diplomatic service, serving initially under Martin Luther before working for Otto Abetz in Paris. However he was dismissed from this position due to a sexual harassment case. He briefly joined the army in 1942 before serving as a history lecturer at the University of Strasbourg and a professor at Posen University. He was captured by the British and held at the internment camp at Staumühle until 1948. Following his release Krüger had to find employment as a textiles sales representative due to his associations with the Nazi university system.

== Post-war politics ==
Krüger and Herbert Böhme formed their own political party in 1949 although this group was quickly absorbed into the larger Deutsche Reichspartei. However this party proved too moderate for Krüger and on 21 October 1949 he left to become a founding member of the Socialist Reich Party and vice-chair of the party council. He joined the Deutsche Aufbaupartei in 1953 when this group was banned.

From then on he concentrated much of his efforts on disseminating neo-Nazi propaganda, setting up his own journal, the Nationaler Buchdienst, in 1956 and adding a book club, Das Reich im Buch, the following year. He also became associated with Arthur Ehrhardt's Nation Europa journal and became a regularly featured writer, whilst also maintaining contacts with the Naumann-Kreis. He returned to politics briefly in when he was an unsuccessful candidate for the Deutsche Reichspartei in the 1961 federal election in Hanover and the following year was named to the executive board of the Deutsche Freiheits Partei but for the most part he remained a propagandist.

He died in Hesslingen, Hessisch Oldendorf.
