= German League for People and Homeland =

Far-right German political organization

The German League for People and Homeland Deutsche Liga für Volk und Heimat
- Abbreviation: DLVH
- Founded: 1991
- Split from: The Republicans
- Ideology: German nationalism Right-wing populism
- Political position: Far-right

The German League for People and Homeland (German: Deutsche Liga für Volk und Heimat or DLVH) is a far-right political organization in Germany.

== History ==
The DVLH had its origins in the power struggle within Die Republikaner between moderate leader Franz Schönhuber and his more extreme deputy Harald Neubauer, which culminated in Schönhuber being forced to temporarily resign in 1990. However he soon gained the upper hand and, returning to the leadership, forced Neubauer out of the party and replaced him as vice-chairman with Rolf Schlierer.

With Neubauer and a number of his followers purged, they regrouped in January 1991 under the banner of the Deutsche Allianz-Vereinigte Rechte, before adopting the DVLH sobriquet later that same year. The new group had the declared aim of uniting the many factions on the far-right under a single banner and initially had some success, attracting three Republikaner MEPs (Johanna Grund, Peter Köhler and Hans-Günther Schodruch) and the support of the influential Nation Europa journal. Neubauer, Rudolf Kendzia and Jürgen Schützinger were part of a three-man leadership team. Although former NPD chiefs Martin Mussgnug and Franz Glasauer were also given leading roles the new group made little impression in the state elections of 1992, the first in which it ran candidates.

It gained its first political representation that same year when a German People's Union (DVU) member of the Free Hanseatic City of Bremen state legislature joined the party. During the 1990s other DVU members in Schleswig-Holstein also joined the party, although the process went into decline from 1995 as they returned to the DVU. In the 1996 election the party captured only 0.2% of the Schleswig-Holstein vote, underlining their decline in the area. As a result, the group ceased to organise as a political party in 1997, continuing as a political association. Despite this, they ran in local elections in 2004, capturing 6.2% of the vote and two seats in Villingen-Schwenningen.
