= Harald Neubauer =

German politician and journalist

Harald Neubauer (born 3 December 1951 in Hamburg; died 29 December 2021) was a German politician and journalist from the far right scene. He was a Member of the European Parliament from 1989 to 1994.

Neubauer was trained as an overseas buyer and undertook military service in the Bundeswehr. He was a member of the National Democratic Party of Germany from 1969 to 1972 and again from 1975 to 1981 but became associated with Gerhard Frey and the German People's Union, editing Frey's newspaper Deutschen Anzeigers (1975–1983).

In 1983 he joined Die Republikaner and became press advisor of party founder Franz Schönhuber the following year. He backed Schönhuber in his subsequent power struggle with Franz Handlos and as such when Schönhuber became chairman in 1985 he appointed Neubauer as secretary. He soon added the roles of regional chairman in Bavaria, federal vice-chairman and Member of the European Parliament to his accolades and was widely seen as the eventual successor to Schönhuber. The two became estranged however as Neubauer followed a more extremist path and for a while in 1990 he even forced the temporary resignation of his former mentor. Ultimately however the leader triumphed in the struggle, forcing Neubauer out of the party and replacing him as vice-chairman with Rolf Schlierer.

Neubauer and many of his followers were purged from the Die Republikaner and in January 1991 they regrouped under the title Deutsche Allianz-Vereinigte Rechte, which was renamed German League for People and Homeland later that year. The new group had the declared aim of uniting the many factions on the far-right under a single banner and initially had some success, attracting two other Republikaner MEPs and the support of the influential Nation Europa journal. He was part of a three-man leadership team with Rudolf Kendzia and Jürgen Schützinger. At the time a Member of the European Parliament, Neubauer managed to convince three of his colleagues in that institution, Johanna Grund, Peter Köhler and Hans-Günther Schodruch, to join the new movement. Former NPD chiefs Martin Mussgnug and Franz Glasauer were also given leading roles yet the new group made little impression in the state elections of 1992.

In 1992 he became co-editor of Nation und Europa and is a member of the board of the Gesellschaft für Freie Publizistik, a far right writers and publishers organisation.

With the German League for People and Homeland defunct Neubauer ran on the NPD list in the 2005 German federal election in Saxony.

He died in Coburg, Germany on 29 December 2021, 26 days after his 70th birthday.
