= Nation Europa =

Monthly political magazine in Germany (1951–2009)

- Categories: Politics (far-right), culture
- Frequency: Monthly
- Publisher: Nation Europa Verlag
- Founder: Arthur Ehrhardt; Herbert Boehme
- Founded: 1951
- Final issue: 2009
- Country: Germany
- Based in: Coburg
- Language: German

Nation Europa (also called Nation und Europa) was a far-right monthly magazine, published in Germany. It was founded in 1951 and was based in Coburg until its closure in 2009. It is also the name of the publishing house that developed the magazine, Nation Europa Verlag.

== History ==
Nation Europa was founded by former SA member and SS commander Arthur Ehrhardt and Herbert Boehme. Helmut Sündermann, a high-ranking National-Socialist propagandist, writing under the pen name “Heinrich Sanden” also helped found the magazine. The publication took its title from a phrase sometimes used by Oswald Mosley to describe his Europe a Nation vision. Adopting a European-wide vision, writers such as Gaston-Armand Amaudruz and Maurice Bardèche were closely associated with the publication. Initially its largest single shareholder was Swedish neo-Nazi and former Olympic athlete Carl-Ehrenfried Carlberg. It was edited by Ehrhardt in association with a board of five made up of Per Engdahl, Hans Oehler, Paul van Tienen, Erik Lærum and Erich Kern.

== Assessment ==
In 1955, the journal was classified as neo-Nazi by the Institute of Contemporary History (Munich). As late as 1989, the political scientist Eckhard Jesse described the magazine as the most important right-wing extremist publication since 1951. Thomas Pfeiffer, researcher at the State Office for the Protection of the Constitution of North Rhine-Westphalia places Nation Europa on the spectrum of the German New Right. He notes that the publication, due to its age, held far-right positions before the emergence of the New Right: the magazine "opened up early to new right-wing extremist ideology variants, instead of simply returning to Nazism." Pfeiffer characterizes Nation Europa as a "decisive forerunner and pioneer of the New Right", which is "one of the ideas generators of German right-wing extremism". However, he notes that the intellectual level of the magazine steadily declined over the years.

In later years the publication became more closely associated with Deutsche Liga für Volk und Heimat. It was accused of giving space to Nazism and was investigated by the German government to this end. It was also associated with Holocaust denial and praised Mahmoud Ahmadinejad when he announced a conference on the topic. The magazine was renamed Nation und Europa in 1990. In 2000 Nation und Europa was merged with 'Lesen und Schenken'. They later publish a new journal of current affairs, Zuerst!, with Nation und Europa closed in 2009.

== Notable authors ==
- Gaston-Armand Amaudruz
- Safet Babic
- Alain de Benoist
- Yvan Blot
- Gottlob Berger
- Günter Deckert
- Ferdinand Ďurčanský
- Henning Eichberg
- Per Engdahl
- Julius Evola
- Johanna Grund
- Fritz Hippler
- Erwin Guido Kolbenheyer
- Gerhard Krüger
- Jean-Marie Le Pen
- Bruno Mégret
- Armin Mohler
- Andreas Mölzer
- Oswald Mosley
- Werner Naumann
- Harald Neubauer
- Hans Oehler
- Wilfred von Oven
- Oswald Pirow
- Karl-Heinz Priester
- Emil Schlee
- Franz Schönhuber
- Alexander Raven Thomson
- Georg Franz-Willing

== See also ==
- List of magazines in Germany
