= 1989 European Parliament election in West Germany =

- 18 June 1989

All 81 German seats in the European Parliament
- Turnout: 62.3%
	First party	Second party	Third party
Party	CDU/CSU	SPD	Greens
Alliance	EPP	SOC	G
Seats before	41	33	7
Seats won	32	31	8
Seat change	▼9	▼2	▲1
Popular vote	10,659,123	10,525,728	2,382,102
Percentage	37.7%	37.3%	8.4%
Swing	▼8.3%	▼0.1%	▲0.2%
	Fourth party	Fifth party
Party	REP	FDP
Alliance	DR	ELDR
Seats before	0	0
Seats won	6	4
Seat change	▲6	▲4
Popular vote	2,008,629	1,576,715
Percentage	7.1%	5.6%
Swing	▲7.1%	▲0.8%

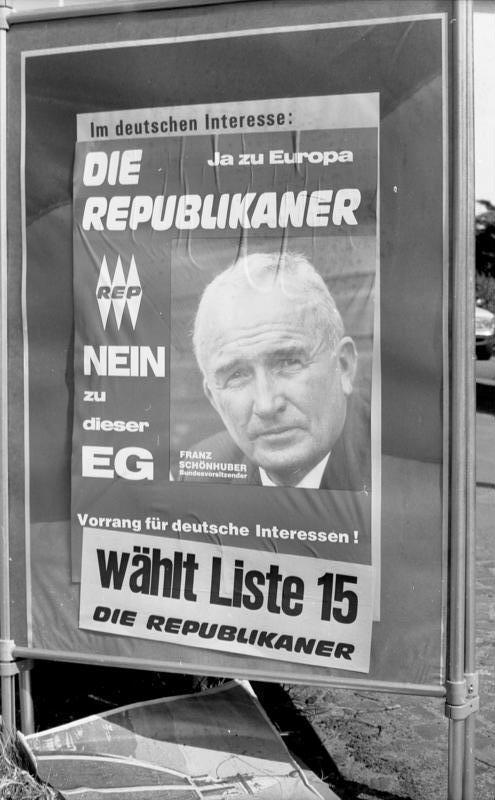
Poster campaign of the Republicans for the 1989 European election, featuring Franz Schönhuber.

An election of the delegation from West Germany to the European Parliament was held in 1989.

== Results ==
Party or alliance		Votes	%	Seats	+/–
S&D	Social Democratic Party	10,525,728	37.32	30	–1
EPP	Christian Democratic Union	8,332,846	29.54	24	–7
G	The Greens	2,382,102	8.45	7	0
EPP	Christian Social Union	2,326,277	8.25	7	0
DR	The Republicans	2,008,629	7.12	6	New
ELDR	Free Democratic Party	1,576,715	5.59	4	+4
NI	German People's Union	444,921	1.58	0	New
NI	Ecological Democratic Party	184,309	0.65	0	0
NI	Bavaria Party	71,991	0.26	0	0
NI	German Communist Party	57,704	0.20	0	New
NI	German Solidarity Union	55,463	0.20	0	New
NI	Christian Centre	43,580	0.15	0	New
NI	Centre Party	41,190	0.15	0	0
NI	Mature Citizens	32,246	0.11	0	0
NI	Christian League	30,879	0.11	0	New
NI	New Consciousness	20,868	0.07	0	New
NI	Free German Workers' Party	19,151	0.07	0	New
NI	Patriots for Germany	12,907	0.05	0	New
NI	Humanist Party	10,885	0.04	0	New
NI	For a Europe of Workers and Democracy	10,377	0.04	0	New
NI	Marxist–Leninist Party of Germany	10,134	0.04	0	New
NI	Federation of Socialist Workers	7,788	0.03	0	New
Total		28,206,690	100.00	78	0
Valid votes		28,206,690	98.94		
Invalid/blank votes		301,908	1.06		
Total votes		28,508,598	100.00		
Registered voters/turnout		45,773,179	62.28		
Source: Federal Statistics Office

West Berlin, due to its special status, was ineligible to participate in the election. Instead, the city legislature indirectly elected three members:

Party or alliance		Seats	+/–
G	Alternative List	1	+1
S&D	Social Democratic Party	1	0
EPP	Christian Democratic Union	1	–1
Total		3	0
Source: Wahlen-in-Deutschland.de

Following the reunification, a delegation of 18 observers from former East Germany was sent to the European Parliament on February 21, 1991.
