= Pro Germany Citizens' Movement =

Pro Germany Citizens' Movement Bürgerbewegung pro Deutschland
- Chairman: Manfred Rouhs
- Vice-Chairman: Alfred Dagenbach
- Founded: 20 January 2005
- Dissolved: 11 November 2017
- Headquarters: Allee der Kosmonauten 28; 12681 Berlin
- Ideology: Right-wing populism
- Political position: Far-right

Website
- www.pro-deutschland.net

The Pro Germany Citizens' Movement (German: Bürgerbewegung pro Deutschland) was a far-right political party in Germany. It was founded in Cologne on 20 January 2005 as a part of the Pro-movement after Pro Cologne members had been elected to the Cologne City Council. Manfred Rouhs, treasurer of the Pro Cologne movement and former candidate of the German League for People and Homeland and the National Democratic Party of Germany, was elected its first chairman. The federal party convent decided at its ninth ordinary meeting in Wuppertal on 11 November 2017 to dissolve the party.

The party was linked to the citizens' movements Pro Cologne and Pro NRW that are only active in the city of Cologne and the state of North Rhine-Westphalia, respectively.

== Program ==
The party advocated law and order; lowering the age of criminal responsibility from 14 to 12 years of age; deportation of illegal immigrants, and the segregation of students with insufficient German language proficiency.

It was critical of multi-national corporations, in particular banks and other financial institutions. German parents are promised a child check worth €5,000 and a family loan up to €20,000.

== Structure ==
The headquarters of pro Germany were located in Berlin. The first state party was formed in Berlin (Pro Berlin Citizen's Movement). Pro NRW and Pro Cologne are only active in North Rhine-Westphalia and Cologne, respectively. The "Pro Movement", organised as an association, serves as an umbrella organisation to co-ordinate the activities of the formally independent parties.

The party has been endorsed by the Freedom Party of Austria but lost this endorsement, once the FPÖ decided to not support any other parties in Germany besides the AfD.

== Elections ==
The party's regional branch in Berlin contested the state election on 18 September 2011. Its electoral campaign has attracted considerable attention of the media. On 25 July, three days after the Norway attacks, Pro Germany supporters gathered for a "silent vigil" in front of the Norwegian embassy. Governing Mayor Klaus Wowereit sharply protested against the perceived disturbance of the commemoration. Later the former state treasurer Thilo Sarrazin successfully filed a suit against Pro Germany because they had used his name in their slogan "Wählen gehen für Thilos Thesen!" (Go to the polls for Thilo's theses!"). On 11 August, two Pro Germany campaigners were arrested. According to the police and media reports, they had charged at a migrant passerby with a hammer handle and assaulted a police officer with fists and pepper spray. Eventually, Pro Germany won 1.2% of the votes. Therefore, they failed to surmount the 5% threshold and did not win any seats in the House of Representatives.

== Pro Cologne Citizens' Movement ==
The Pro Cologne Citizens' Movement (German: Bürgerbewegung pro Köln) was formed in 1996 as an offshoot of the extreme right-wing German League for People and Homeland. The far-right publisher Manfred Rouhs and the lawyer Markus Beisicht have been active in the association from its start. In the 1999 mayoral election, the party presented Stephan Flug as its candidate who won 0.3% of the votes. When the municipality planned to erect a mosque in Cologne's Chorweiler district, the citizen's movement organised a collection of signatures petitioning against the project. They were able to present 28,000 signatures against any mosque construction site in Cologne to the committee on petitions only shortly before the 2004 local elections. With the tailwinds from the signatures campaign, the voter's association was able to win 4.7% of the votes and four seats in the Cologne city council. In 2005, a fifth councillor joined Pro Cologne's group. The electoral success initiated the expansion of the party to the state and federal level.

In 2007, the movement ran another signature campaign against the Cologne Central Mosque in Ehrenfeld. They showed more than 23,000 signatures, however at least 7,000 of them were not valid and the citizen's initiative failed. In September 2008, Pro Cologne organised the Anti-Islamisation Congress, inviting Mario Borghezio and Filip Dewinter among others. Counter-protests and blockings prompted the police to cancel the congress and rally. The congress was repeated in May 2009. In the 2009 Cologne local election, the party won 5.4% of the votes and was able to defend its five council seats. The chairman of Pro Cologne, Markus Beisicht, ran for mayor and won 4.8% of the votes. At the local elections on 25 May 2014, the party lost more than half its votes and could hold on to only two seats in the city council.

The North Rhine-Westphalian state intelligence service (Verfassungsschutz) has observed the grouping. From 2004 to 2010 it has presented it in its annual reports for the suspicion of right-wing extremist aspirations. In October 2005, Pro Cologne filed a suit against the state to get the mention of the party removed from the annual report. Thereupon the Higher Administrative Court has ruled that there are sufficient factual indications for the suspicions, that justify the observation and mention in the report. Since 2011 the intelligence service has stated that the indications for anti-constitutional aspirations went beyond the scope of mere suspicion. According to their observations, the movement violates the human rights as specified in the German constitution. Several members of the party were convicted of fraud, perjury, and tax evasion in connection with falsified attendance fee calculations as city council members.

The leadership of Pro Cologne decided on March 7, 2018, to dissolve the organization. The final decision is supposed to be resolved by a General Meeting on April 15, 2018.

== Political classification ==
According to FH Düsseldorf sociologist Alexander Häusler whose research focus is neo-Nazism, pro Germany can be considered a far-right movement on the fringes of right-wing extremism and right-wing populism. He sees ethnonationalist and racist as well as antisemitic strands, authoritarian ideas and the rejection of equality and discrimination of minorities in activities of pro Germany, particularly the campaigning against multiculturalism, building of mosques and minarets.

The party was considered a part of the counter-jihad movement.

== Sources ==
- Bürgerbewegung pro Deutschland at the Federal Returning Officer's website
- Alexander Häusler: Rechtspopulismus in Gestalt einer neuen Bürgerbewegung
