= Johanna Grund =

German journalist, writer and politician (1934–2017)

Johanna Christina Grund (17 July 1934 in Breslau – 13 July 2017) was a German journalist, writer and politician with Die Republikaner (REP). She was a member of the European Parliament between 1989 and 1994.

Grund was a leading member of the REP during the late 1980s and for a time served as deputy leader. However she became critical of the leadership of Franz Schönhuber as REP began to lose ground in elections in the late 1980s. As part of the power struggle Grund, along with Hans Dorn and Karl Richter, briefly gained control of the party journal Der Republikanische Anzeiger in 1990 before being forced out by Schönhuber and instead printing the dissident Deutsche Rundschau. Grund even served as interim leader of the party following Schönhuber's temporary resignation in 1990.

Her opposition to his leadership led to her expulsion from the party, along with fellow MEP Harald Neubauer, after Schönhuber successfully saw off a challenge to his leadership in the summer of 1990. Following the formation of the German League for People and Homeland (DVLH) by Neubauer in January 1991 Grund joined the group along with fellow MEPs Peter Köhler and Hans-Günther Schodruch, both of whom had resigned from REP in protest at Schönhuber's leadership. She continued to be involved in the production of Deutsche Rundschau, which became the party organ of DVLH until it was absorbed by Nation Europa in 1994.
