= Herbert Böhme =

German poet and Nazi activist (1907–1971)

- Born: 7 October 1907; Frankfurt (Oder)
- Died: 23 October 1971 (aged 64); Lochham, Gräfelfing

Herbert Böhme (7 October 1907 – 23 October 1971) was a German poet who wrote poems and battle hymns for the Nazi Party. In 1930 he became one of the newly formed Junge Mannschaft, a group of semi-official Nazi poets that included Heinrich Anacker and Hitler Youth leader Baldur von Schirach. Böhme joined the Nazi Party on 1 May 1933 and its original paramilitary wing, the Brownshirts, on 1 September 1933. After the Second World War he became involved with neo-fascism.

== National Socialist poetry ==
Böhme and his works have not been dealt with kindly by some critics, dismissed as propaganda and lacking real artistic merit. In praise of Adolf Hitler, he wrote "you walk among the people as their saviour". His best-known work in the Third Reich was Cantata for 9 November, a eulogy to the Nazi 'martyrs' of the Feldherrnhalle which praised Hitler in Messianic terms. Other poems, including Wir hissen die Fahne and Langemarck, also became Nazi standards.

== Post-war activism ==
After the war he became an associate of Gerhard Krüger, and along with him led a short-lived political party that was quickly absorbed by the Deutsche Reichspartei in 1949. The two would later move to the more extremist Socialist Reich Party. Böhme was also close to Arthur Ehrhardt and in 1951 the pair established the pan-European nationalist journal Nation Europa, which was to become important to the neo-fascist network across Europe. In 1965, Böhme joined the National Democratic Party of Germany (NPD).

Böhme established the Deutsches Kulturwerk Europäischen Geistes in 1950, an extreme right organisation that had the stated mission of promoting German culture. Thus group was active until 1996. He also set up his own youth group, the Deutschen Unitarier-Jugend in 1952, an organisation that later merged with the extremist Wiking-Jugend.
