= Zuerst! =

Monthly news magazine in Germany

- Editor-in-chief: Andreas Karsten
- Categories: News magazine
- Frequency: Monthly
- First issue: 1 January 2010; 16 years ago
- Country: Germany
- Based in: Selent
- Language: German
- Website: Zuerst
- ISSN: 1869-5493
- OCLC: 690427829

Zuerst! (German: First!) is a monthly German news magazine published in Selent, Germany. The magazine has a far-right-wing political stance.

As the successor to one of the most important theoretical journals of the post-war German fascist and right-wing extremist "Nation and Europe" founded in 1951, the magazine lost importance with the rise of the right-wing populist "Alternative Media."

== History ==
Zuerst! was founded in January 2010 as a successor to the now-defunct Nation und Europa magazine. It was supported by right-wing publishers in Germany. The publisher of the magazine was Lesen und Schenken. At that time the distributor of the magazine was Bauer media group which also owned it later. In September 2012, the group sold Zuerst! due to criticism by Der Spiegel.

Editors of the magazine also write for other right-wing publications. The former editors-in-chief of Zuerst! are Günther Deschner and Manuel Ochsenreiter. Andreas Karsten was named as the editor-in-chief in December 2021. Sociologist Andreas Karsten is an activist from the Identitarian Movement in Halle/Saale. Both Ochsenreiter and Karsten, along with several other authors from "Zuerst!", have also written for Junge Freiheit and the right-wing miniature magazine "Sezession."

The monthly, which provides news on the economy, current affairs, travel and culture, is also distributed in Austria, Luxembourg, Switzerland and South Tyrol.

== Political leaning and controversy ==
Zuerst! reported its political leaning and policy as follows: "The German news magazine ZUERST! will serve German - not foreign - interests." Immediately after its first issue the Office for the Protection of the Constitution announced that the content of the magazine was against the "unending de-nazification efforts", advocating revisionist theories on national boundaries, and the terrorist activities of the "South Tirolean Freedom Fighters" in the 1960s.

In 2019 the editor Manuel Ochsenreiter was accused of sponsoring a group of radical Poles who staged a false flag arson attack of Hungarian culture center in Uzhhorod in order to discredit the government of Ukraine. The Poles testified in court that Ochsenreiter, who had long lasting ties to Russian government and separatists in Ukraine, passed them money and instructed them as to the way of conducting the arson for it to have most media impact. According to OCCRP investigation, Ochsenreiter received thousands of euros from Russia's International Agency for Current Policy for publishing pro-Russian articles. In 2019, when investigation into the false flag attack in Ukraine was initiated, Ochsenreiter fled to Moscow and lived there until he died in suspicious circumstances in August 2021.

== See also ==
- List of magazines in Germany
