= Heidelberg Manifesto =

1981 manifesto signed by German academics

The Heidelberg Manifesto of 17 June 1981 was signed by 15 German university and college professors to warn about the "infiltration of the German people" and of the "Überfremdung" (roughly, 'over-foreignisation') of German language, culture and 'Volkstum' (roughly 'national/ethnic character'). It is widely deemed to have been the first time after 1945 that racism and xenophobia were publicly - albeit controversially - legitimised by academics in Germany.

== First draft ==
The manifesto's primary initiators were Theodor Schmidt-Kaler (German pronunciation: [ˈteːodoːɐ̯ ˈʃmɪtˌkaːlɐ]; born 8 June 1930 in Seibelsdorf, Bavaria), an astronomer and self-taught demographer of Bochum University, and Helmut Schröcke (German pronunciation: [ˈhɛlmuːt ˈʃʁœkə]; born 18 June 1922 in Zwickau, Saxony), a mineralogist of LMU Munich. Both professors already stated their main theses in advance which were then adopted into the manifesto. In 1980, they wrote:

Today, the term 'Volk' can be defined scientifically: 'Völker' are, cybernetically and biologically, living systems of a higher order with distinct systemic properties that are passed on genetically. This also applies to the non-physical properties which are inherited just like the physical ones (the milieu theory is scientifically wrong)."

Our problem are not the guest workers as such but their Asiatic component. [...] Leaving out the special problem of Southern Italy, we can conclude that, according to their fertility, their cultural, sociological and religious context, we can expect the acculturation of the guest worker families coming to us from the European area. [...] None of this applies to the Asiatics."

The original version of the Heidelberg Manifesto was penned by Schröcke on 17 June 1981 and signed by 15 professors in total. Next to Schmidt-Kaler and Schröcke, the pertaining professors were: Manfred Bambeck (Goethe University Frankfurt), Rolf Fricke (KIT), Karl Georg Götz (University of Stuttgart), Werner Georg Haverbeck (Collegium Humanum), Joachim Illies (MPI of Limnology), Peter Manns (University of Mainz), Theodor Oberländer (retired Minister of Expellees), Harold Rasch (Goethe University Frankfurt), Franz Hieronymus Riedl (from Austria), Heinrich Schade (Heinrich Heine University Düsseldorf), Kurt Schürmann (University of Mainz), Ferdinand Siebert (University of Mainz), and Georg Stadtmüller (LMU Munich).

In this original version (which at first was not planned to be presented to the wider public), there was, e.g., this passage:

With great concern we observe the infiltration of the German people [i.e. Volk] by the influx of many millions of foreigners and their families, the over-foreignisation [i.e. Überfremdung] of our language, our culture and our national character [i.e. Volkstum]. [...] The integration of large masses of non-German foreigners is therefore not compatible with the preservation of our people at the same time, and leads to the well-known ethnic catastrophes of multi-cultural societies. Each people, the German one as well, has a natural right to the preservation of its identity and character in its residential territory. Respect for other peoples mandates their preservation, but not their amalgamation ('Germanisation').

By the end of 1981, the manifesto's original version was published in three far-right magazines at once: the Deutsche Wochenzeitung [German Weekly Newspaper], Nation & Europa, and Deutschland in Geschichte und Gegenwart [Germany in Past and Present]. Furthermore, this version was distributed at the same time as a flyer in several university towns. Thereby, students at the University of Bonn and LMU Munich became aware of this and informed the mainstream media.

In January 1982, there were some first public reactions because of the extensive coverage. For instance, for the Bavarian Liberal Democrats, the manifesto was a "vicious pamphlet and nothing more than a rehash of racist Nazi ideology."

Also in January 1982, an Schutzbund für das deutsche Volk [Association for the Protection of the German People] (SDV) invited people on behalf of Schmidt-Kaler to a founding and discussion seminar titled (in translation) 'Scientific and Ethical Foundations of the Heidelberg Manifesto of 17 June 1981' which took place on 23 January 1982 in Heidelberg. Already the manifesto itself had called upon "all organisations, associations and civic initiatives who devote themselves to the preservation of our people, our language, culture and lifestyle to found an umbrella organisation." Schmidt-Kaler proclaimed during the event that he was responsible for the public relations of the SDV.

== Second draft ==
After numerous critical reactions from the public, a press statement was given on 31 January 1982 in Mainz and a revised version of the manifesto was presented by Schmidt-Kaler. He stated that it had been necessary to go public on one's own due to a "defamation campaign directed by the radical left" and the "attempted infiltration by far-right elements."

By indiscretions, which the signatories cannot be held accountable for, the Heidelberg Manifesto went public in its provisional form which was only designed for winning further signatories." (Schmidt-Kaler)

Schmidt-Kaler distanced himself from his colleague Schröcke who became a member in the SDV:

The association Schutzbund für das deutsche Volk, which is being founded, is neither politically nor by its authority able to exercise the duties of the association mentioned in the Heidelberg Manifesto's provisional version. We are not members of this association. The association is not entitled to make any statements or spread any announcements for us or on our behalf.

The revised and mellowed version of the Manifesto, published 31 January 1982, was not signed by Götz, Oberländer, Riedl, Schade, and Schröcke. Werner Rutz (Bochum U) joined as a new signatory. There was now e.g. the following passage:

Respect for other peoples mandates their preservation but not their amalgamation. [...] To infer from this term [Volk] that there may also be peoples [Völker] not worthy of preservation, equals interpreting against the rules of scientific hermeneutics and grossly distorts our cause.

== Persistent Criticism ==
The revised draft also created a scandal as it was claimed to contain racist, xenophobic and nationalist passages. Critics accused the authors to argue just as völkisch-ly and to adopt the neo-rightist concept of ethnopluralism despite their limiting remarks and their distancing from racism and right-wing extremism. Ethnopluralism claims to postulate no intrinsic hierarchy between peoples but regards them as worthy of preservation and threatened by 'amalgamation'.

During the course of the extensive media coverage, both of the Manifesto's versions were printed verbatim by various newspapers in 1982, as a document of their time. In reaction to it and as a manifesto for understanding among the nations, 24 other professors of Bochum University signed a counter-statement on 16 February 1982.

== Further development ==
The Mainz Set around Schmidt-Kaler was not active anymore during the following years. Schröcke remained committed to the SDV. Up until today, the Schutzbund is viewed as right-wing extremist by the Intelligence Services of several German states. In February 1984, the SDV published a pamphlet on behalf of Schröcke, titled Grundgesetzlicher Grundwert - Deutsches Volk [The Basic Law's Basic Value - The German People], in which he appears as "the Heidelberg Manifesto's custodian" and presents his propositions for immigration policy. At the end of 1984, Schröcke published a brochure on the SDV's "demands regarding immigration policy" in the far-right Grabert publishing house, together with Heinrich Schade and Robert Hepp.

== See also ==
- Volk for an overview of the key concept in German nationalism
- German far-right
- Überfremdung for the German catchword indicating an excess of immigration
- Rivers of blood, a significant outburst against immigration in post-war Britain

== Bibliography ==
- Herbert Leuninger: "Kirche und Heidelberger Manifest" [The Church and the Heidelberg Manifesto] (1983), Zeitschrift für Ausländerrecht und Ausländerpolitik 3, pp. 117–124.
- Claus Burgkart: "Das 'Heidelberger Manifest', Grundlage staatlicher Ausländerpolitik" [The 'Heidelberg Manifesto', the basis of national immigration policy] (1984). In: Rolf, Meinhardt (ed.): Türken raus? Oder Verteidigt den sozialen Frieden. Hamburg: Rowohlt, pp. 141–161
- Ingrid Tomkowiak: "Das 'Heidelberger Manifest' und die Volkskunde" [The 'Heidelberg Manifesto' and folklore studies/cultural anthropology] (1996). In: Zeitschrift für Volkskunde 92, pp. 185–207.
