= Gerhard Frey (politician) =

German publisher, businessman and politician

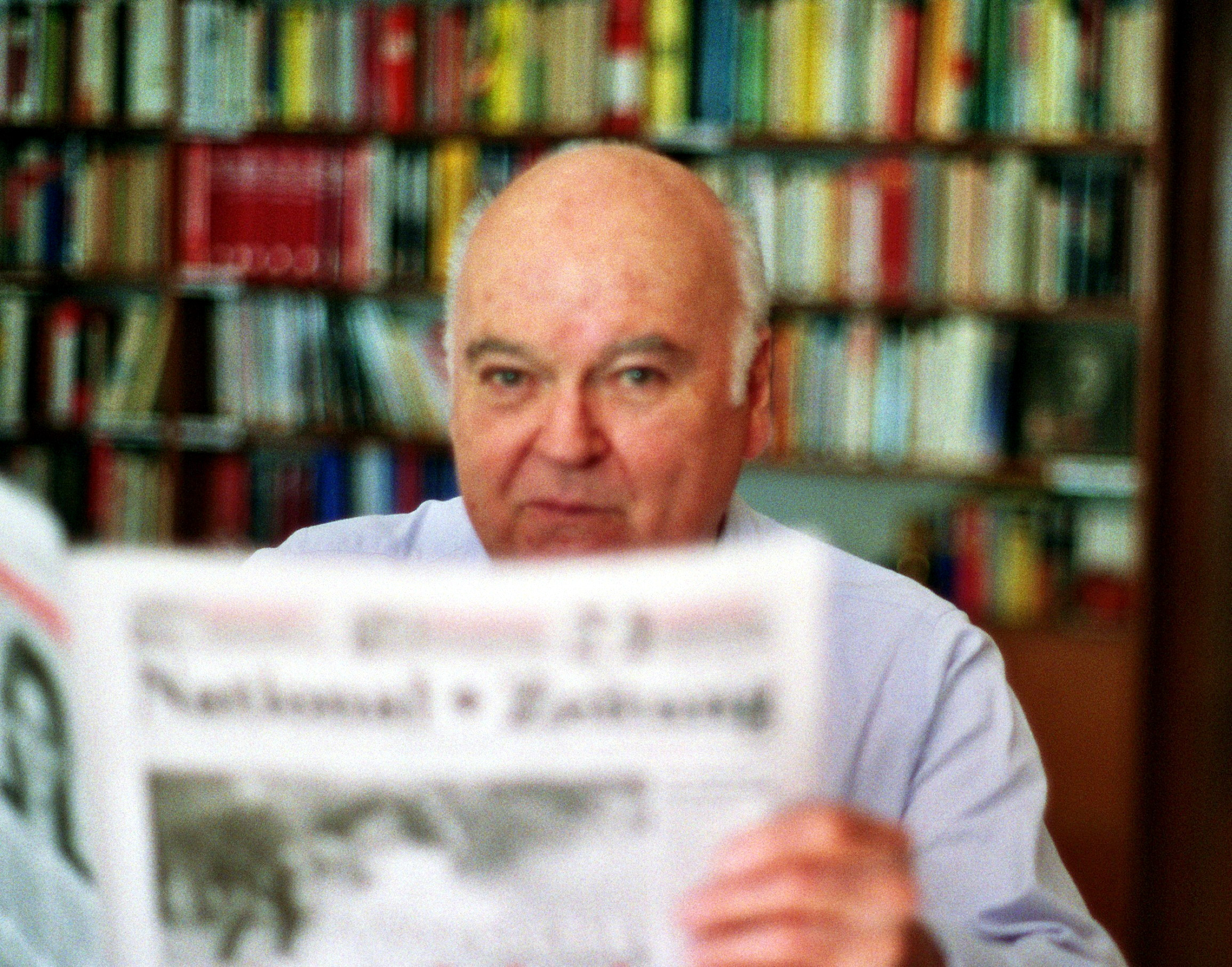
- Frey in 2009
- Born: Gerhard Michael Frey; 18 February 1933; Cham, Weimar Republic
- Died: 19 February 2013 (aged 80); Gräfelfing, Germany
- Occupations: Business, Publishing
- Spouse: Regine Frey
- Children: 4 children

Gerhard Michael Frey (18 February 1933 – 19 February 2013) was a German publisher, businessman and right-wing nationalistic politician. He was the chairman and main financial backer of the right-wing party Deutsche Volksunion (DVU), which he founded in 1971. He resigned as chairman in January 2009.

== Biography ==
Gerhard Frey was born on 18 February 1933 in Cham. He studied law. In 1960 Frey received his PhD (Dr. rer. pol.) from the University of Graz, Austria. His dissertation was a study of the trade pattern between Austria and Germany. He was married to Regine Frey, with whom he had four children. Frey died on 19 February 2013, the day after his 80th birthday, in Gräfelfing near Munich.

The scholar Cas Mudde described Frey as "One of the most influential people in the German post-war extreme right scene" and a "multi-millionaire media czar who owns and publishes several newspapers".

Frey took control of the far right Deutsche Soldaten-Zeitung in 1959 when it was economically desolate. Later it was renamed National Zeitung, and Frey raised the paper’s circulation from 27,500 in 1958 to 131,000 in 1967. Frey developed the paper into the leading right-wing radical organ of the West-germany with a circulation of over 100,000 copies until the early 1980s.

The paper frequently published historical negationist and anti-Israel articles. In 1967 it used the term desk murderer (Schreibtischtäter) referring to people who support Israel as, in its view, they thereby take the risk to become accomplices in crimes committed there. He wrote many articles himself, usually without mentioning his name.

In the 1969 federal election, Frey unsuccessfully sought candidacy for the National Democratic Party of Germany (NPD). When his hopes of becoming a member of the federal executive committee were dashed after joining the party in 1975, he left the NPD in 1979 and focused his political activities on the Deutsche Volksunion (DVU), which he founded in 1971. This organization became a cross-party melting pot of the radical right, competing with the NPD, although this did not preclude strategic alliances.

Frey has been described as rarely generous, except at his party functions where he hosted David Irving, whom he paid generously and provided a hired luxury car for. A large amount of advertising in National Zeitung were for Frey's other businesses, thus more money than usual went back to Frey. Such businesses included Deutsche Reisen, a travel service, and the Deutscher Buchdienst, selling books, medals and flags. Frey's party, the DVU, was described as the "Frey-Party" because of its financial dependency on him. The Irish Times, after the party's success in the 1998 Saxony-Anhalt state elections, described the DVU as "less a political party than the dangerous plaything of a millionaire", without any real party structure. At the time, Frey's personal fortune was estimated to be in excess of DM 500 million.

=== Family ===
The Frey family owns numerous properties in Germany, including in Berlin.

=== International connections ===
Frey enjoyed good relations with some conservative politicians like Alfred Seidl, interior minister of Bavaria 1977-78, with European far-right and right wing leaders like Jean-Marie Le Pen (France) and Vladimir Zhirinovsky (Russia) but his relationship with other German far-right leaders was less friendly as they feared his financial power could overwhelm them.

Frey established international contacts with the British historian and Holocaust denier David Irving. Nevertheless, he failed to exert a integrating influence within his own camp. One of his prominent critics from the right-wing camp was the leader of the Freedom Party of Austria, Jörg Haider (1950–2008), who publicly accused him of political egotism in April 1994. However, friendly relations developed with Frey's former rival, Franz Schönhuber (1923–2005), the leader of the Republikaner party. An "exchange of views" leaked to the press about the cooperation between the DVU and the REP contributed to Schönhuber's downfall in 1994.

Among the radical right-wing figures Frey temporarily protected were the publicist and politician Harald Neubauer (1951–2021) and Karl-Heinz Hoffmann (born 1937), who founded a military sports group named after him in 1973.
