= Arthur Ehrhardt =

SS officer (1896–1971)

- Born: March 21, 1896; Mengersgereuth-Hämmern, Saxe-Meiningen
- Died: May 16, 1971 (aged 75)
- Military career
- Allegiance: Nazi Germany
- Service: Waffen-SS
- Service years: 1944–1945
- Rank: Sturmbannführer (Major)
- Known for: Expert in anti-espionage tactics and guerrilla warfare
- Other work: Neo-Nazi activist

Arthur Ehrhardt (21 March 1896 – 16 May 1971) was a Waffen-SS commander who served as a Nazi security warfare expert during World War II. After the war, he became a leading figure in the neo-Nazi movement.

== Early years ==
Ehrhardt was born Mengersgereuth-Hämmern, Saxe-Meiningen. He took part in the Free German Youth movement and was also the founder of the Boy Scouts in his home town of Coburg. He saw action in the First World War before returning to Coburg to teach elementary school. He first came to politics as a member of the right-wing paramilitary force, the Freikorps, after the First World War. Ehrhardt had been a paid informer for the Wehrmacht and was also involved in the training of units of Der Stahlhelm and the Sturmabteilung. It was through his involvement in the latter that Ehrhardt first came to Nazism. He became an officer in the SA but left the movement after the killing of Ernst Röhm and became estranged from the Nazi Party.

== SS service ==
Ehrhardt re-enlisted in the Wehrmacht when war broke out in 1939 and initially served with the Abwehr. At his own request he was transferred to the Waffen-SS in 1944 and worked as a member of Heinrich Himmler's staff. Within the SS he rose to rank of Sturmbannführer (Major), becoming an expert in anti-espionage tactics in the Balkans. He also wrote extensively on the subject of guerrilla warfare, notably in such books as Kleinkrieg. This work has been edited by the Command and General Staff School of the United States Army in Fort Leavenworth, KS in 1936 under the title: Guerrilla Warfare. Lessons of the Past and Possibilities of the Future. However, his insights into the possibility of unusual tactics being used by and against partisans were largely ignored by the Wehrmacht high command. He also served as the expert in the Nazi security warfare in the Führer Headquarters.

== Neo-Nazi activist ==
Following the end of the Second World War Ehrhardt became a strong supporter of Oswald Mosley's Europe a Nation ideal and to this end was the founder (with Herbert Böhme) and editor of the magazine Nation Europa in 1949. He was a minority shareholder in the enterprise and, although the journal was damaged by financial wrangling between Ehrhardt and Werner Naumann, it continued publishing until 2009. He was also a regular writer for Western Destiny, the magazine of Roger Pearson. Politically he was an active member of the European Social Movement and also founded his own group, the Jungeuropäischer Arbeitskreis, in 1958.
