= Rolf Schlierer =

German physician, lawyer and politician

Rolf Schlierer (born 21 February 1955 in Stuttgart) is a German physician, lawyer and politician and the former leader of the German right-wing party The Republicans (REP). He was replaced as party leader in 2014 by Johann Gärtner.

== Early life and non-political career ==
Schlierer studied at the Eberhard-Ludwigs-Gymnasium in Stuttgart, before studying medicine in Gießen and obtaining his licence to practice in 1979. He then entered the military as a medical officer, serving with the Airborne forces.

Following his military service Schlierer took up study in philosophy and jurisprudence at the University of Tübingen between 1981 and 1988. Passing his first legal exams in 1988, he established his legal practice in Stuttgart in 1991.

== Politics ==
Schlierer first came to prominence as chairman of the university political committee of the Deutsche Burschenschaft between 1975 and 1976 and he remained associated with this organisation until 1985. Schlierer became associated with REP sometime after this, although he left the party in 1988 due to the increasing radicalisation under leader Franz Schönhuber. He then rejoined REP in 1989 and soon became deputy chairman of the party in Baden-Württemberg as well as party leader in Stuttgart.

Schlierer succeeded Schönhuber as party chairman on 17 December 1994. As a leader Schlierer has been described as "nondescript", although he lacks the links to Nazism that Schönhuber, a member of the Nazi Party and Waffen SS, had. This was especially important as Schlierer sought to make REP more moderate in order to attract the support of the middle classes. The early stages of his leadership were rocky as internal struggles between his own moderate and the radical wing under Schönhuber threatened to destabilise the party. However, in spite of these problems, his vision was endorsed initially by the electorate as REP won 9.1% of the vote and 14 seats in Baden-Württemberg in 1996 to, at least temporarily, put the internal struggles on hold. Following this election Schlierer was re-elected as chairman at the party's conference by 77% of the delegates in attendance.

Eschewing the possibility of any alliances with more right wing groups such as the German People's Union and the National Democratic Party of Germany, Schlierer took instead as his model Jörg Haider, although he lacked the oratorial talent and charisma of his Austrian counterpart. As part of his admiration for Haider Schlierer even organised a "Solidarity with Austria" campaign during Haider's time in government and told his supporters to holiday in Haider's home state of Carinthia.

Although the Baden-Württemberg result had secured his position, Schlierer would soon find himself facing renewed criticism from the extremists within the party as subsequent election results proved disappointing. As a consequence he faced a leadership challenge in 1998 from Christian Käs. Ultimately Käs withdrew his candidacy at the last minute and so Schlierer continued as leader, although the contest further exposed the divisions between the party's two wings. Käs remained as one of the party's vice-chairmen, and continued to be a critical voice against the leadership, whilst Schlierer was forced into a climbdown when he met representatives of the German People's Union, whom he had previously dismissed as a "paper party" that had little existence beyond leader Gerhard Frey, and agreed that the two parties should call a series of local electoral truces in their main areas of activities.

More recently, as part of his drive for moderation in REP, he has also sought to forge links with the Christian Democratic Union over the issue of maintaining rigidity in German nationality law.

After a series of disappointing election results Schlierer stood down as party leader in 2014. He was succeeded by Johann Gärtner, who had served as Schlierer's deputy for 18 years.

== Personal life ==
Schlierer is married with two children and is a practising Protestant.

Political offices
Preceded by Franz Schönhuber	Leader of the Republicans; 1994 - 2014	Succeeded by Johann Gärtner
