= National-Zeitung =

German extreme right newspaper

- Type: Weekly newspaper
- Format: Broadsheet
- Owner: DSZ Verlag
- Editor: Gerhard Frey
- Founded: 1951
- Ceased publication: December 2019
- Political alignment: Far right
- Headquarters: Munich, Germany

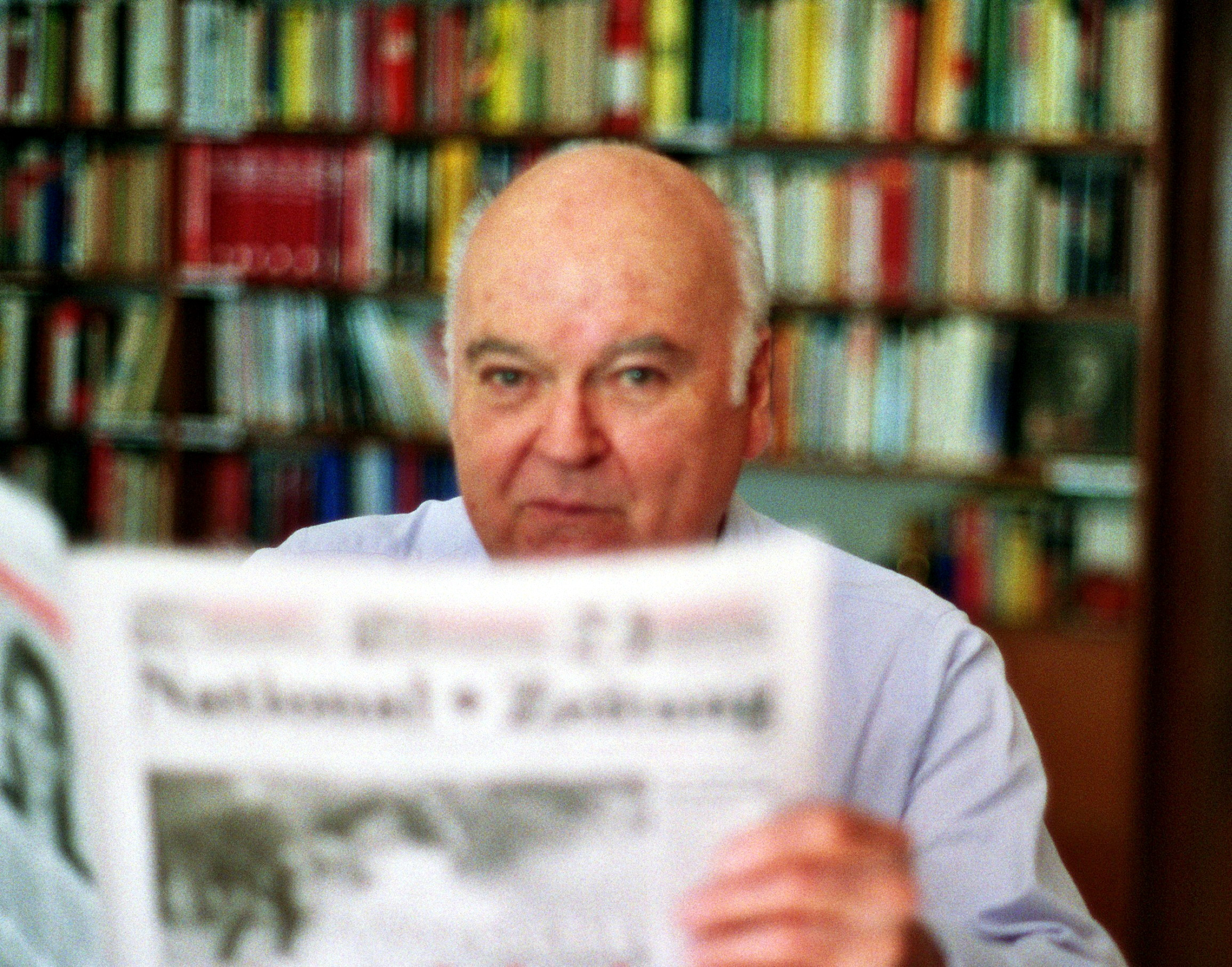
Gerhard Frey in 2009, editor of the National-Zeitung

The National-Zeitung (NZ, National Newspaper) was a weekly, far-right newspaper, published by Gerhard Frey, who also founded the far-right Deutsche Volksunion (German People's Union) as an association in 1971, turning it into a political party in 1987. The party was merged with the National Democratic Party of Germany (NPD). NZ was last published in December 2019.

The newspaper was first published in 1951 as the Deutsche Soldaten-Zeitung, came under Frey's control in 1959, was renamed Deutsche National-Zeitung und Soldaten-Zeitung in 1960–61 and Deutsche National-Zeitung in 1963. In 1999 the newspaper was merged with another of Frey's publications, the Deutsche Wochen-Zeitung – Deutscher Anzeiger, and became the National-Zeitung. It lasted under this name for 20 years until December 2019 when it stopped publishing.

The Bavarian Office for the Protection of the Constitution classified the National-Zeitung as propagating a xenophobic, nationalist and revisionist world view.

== Overview ==
According to the Bavarian Office for the Protection of the Constitution, the DSZ-Verlag (Druckschriften- und Zeitungs-Verlag), publisher of the National-Zeitung, was, for a long time, the most important publisher of far right propaganda in Germany. The Bavarian Office for the Protection of the Constitution classifies the National Zeitung as propagating a xenophobic, nationalist and revisionist world view.

== Content ==
The newspaper was critical of the scale of immigration to Germany, was critical of German rapprochement with Poland and of Israel, accusing the German government of subservience to the latter. It frequently used inflammatory language and tried to deflect from the German crimes during World War II by instead reporting on real or alleged German victims of the war.

Despite the stereotypical far-right content, the newspaper frequently reiterated its commitment to the German constitution. The newspaper also contained a large amount of advertising for Frey's former businesses, like Deutsche Reisen, a travel service, and the Deutsche Buchdienst, which sold books, medals and flags.

== History ==
An earlier, unrelated, National Zeitung had existed in Germany from 1848 onward, as a liberal newspaper, published in Berlin. A Deutsche National-Zeitung was also published in German language in the United States from 1838 to 1840, in Philadelphia.

The National-Zeitung was first published as the Deutsche Soldaten-Zeitung (English: German Soldiers Newspaper) in 1951. The idea for a newspaper as an advocate for the rights of German soldiers originated in a prisoner of war camp in Garmisch-Partenkirchen and came from Nazi Kreisleiter Helmut Damerau and the Wehrmacht Colonel Heinrich Detloff von Kalben. It was supported by Waffen-SS General Felix Steiner and financed by Leo Giess, a carpenter, as well as German Americans.

The Deutsche Soldaten-Zeitung was an advocate of German rearmament but found itself in financial trouble by 1953, when financial support from the US dried up. Damerau approached the West German government for financial support and the newspaper received a monthly subsidy of DM 11,000 from 1953 onward. This however was not received well by the paper's readership, and the circulation of the Deutsche Soldaten-Zeitung dropped from 30,000 to 12,000. In 1954 the German government pushed for the sale of the paper, which Damerau refused and, consequently, the government dropped its financial support. The paper was subsequently only published fortnightly and, for a time in 1955, only monthly and shifted further to the right of the political spectrum.

The fifth anniversary of the first publication of the paper saw it print well-wishes from a number of high ranking former Wehrmacht Generals, among them the former Generalfeldmarschalls Erich von Manstein, Wilhelm List, Albert Kesselring and SS-Oberst-Gruppenführer Paul Hausser of the Waffen-SS.

It called for and organised protests, like when German handball club THW Kiel hosted a team from Wrocław, Poland, because, in the paper's opinion Wrocław should be referred to by its former German name, Breslau. It protested against any form of recognition of the post-war Polish-German border, the Oder–Neisse line and attacked prominent German scientists like Carl Friedrich von Weizsäcker for publishing the Memorandum of Tübingen (German:Tübinger Memorandum) in support of the border. The newspaper also supported the wife of Rudolf Hess in her attempts to free her husband.

The newspaper advocated a return to German military traditions after the formation of the Bundeswehr and attempted to influence officers who had previously served in the Wehrmacht. It was critical of Wolf Graf von Baudissin's concept of citizens in uniform, and the West German government became, in turn, critical of the newspaper. German defence minister Franz-Josef Strauss made unsuccessful attempts to purchase the newspaper, offering Damerau DM 150,000 for the financially troubled paper. Damerau instead asked right-wing journalist Gerhard Frey for a loan and the latter, independently wealthy, gradually gained a controlling interest in the Deutsche Soldaten-Zeitung.

The newspaper continued to publish content with a historical revisionist view, attempting to deflect Germany's responsibility for World War II and attacking members of the German resistance as traitors to the Fatherland.

Since 1959 under Frey's control, the Deutsche Soldaten-Zeitung was renamed Deutsche National-Zeitung und Soldaten-Zeitung in 1960–61. It raised its circulation from 27,500 in 1958 to 70,000 by 1963 and 131,000 by 1967. Frey, while not outrightly denying the Holocaust, illegal in Germany, stated that he considered the number of victims as exaggerated, and argued in the 1960s that Germany should pay less compensation because of this. Frey and his newspaper frequently published anti-Israel and pro-Arab content.

In 1963, the newspaper was renamed Deutsche National-Zeitung. In 1987, Gerhard Frey founded the German far right party Deutsche Volksunion.

Frey's aim had been to make the National-Zeitung the central national organ of all far right parties in Germany.

In 1971 Frey published a second paper, the Deutscher Anzeiger. In 1986, he purchased the revisionist Deutsche Wochen-Zeitung, which had originally been published by members of the far-right National Democratic Party of Germany. In 1991, Frey merged the two newspapers into one, becoming the Deutsche Wochen-Zeitung – Deutscher Anzeiger. Content of this paper was almost identical to the Deutsche National-Zeitung and, in 1999, the two were merged into one, becoming the National-Zeitung.

Despite all this and the fact that Germany grew in size and population after the German reunion, the circulation of the newspaper had dropped to 38,000 by 2007.

The paper was shut down in December 2019.

== Influence and significance ==
The Deutsche National Zeitung was the most important press organ of the old Nazis and revanchaunists in post-war Germany. Along with the Junge Freiheit, it represented one of the most important links between right-wing extremists and right-wing conservatives.

On April 11, 1968, the convicted right-wing extremist Josef Bachmann from Munich carried out an attack on student leader Rudi Dutschke. He carried clippings from the "Deutsche National-Zeitung" newspaper, which had a headline demanding: "Stop Red Rudi Now."

== In popular culture ==
The newspaper was featured in the West German movie Roses for the Prosecutor, in which one of the main characters, the state prosecutor Dr. Wilhelm Schramm, a man with a secret Nazi past, purchases the Deutsche Soldaten-Zeitung. The newspaper subsequently used this exposure for advertisement.
