= Franz Schönhuber =

German journalist, author and politician (1923–2005)

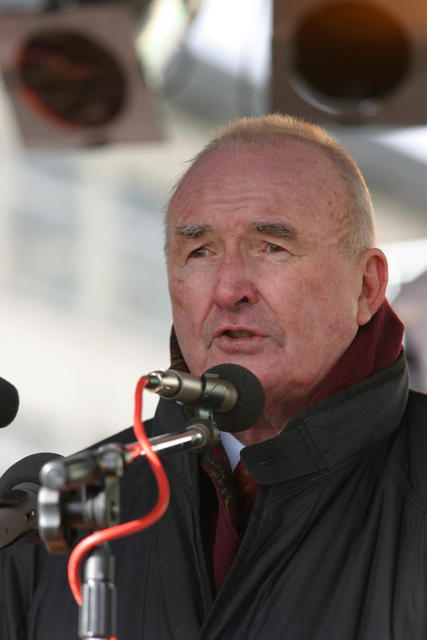
- Born: 10 January 1923
- Died: 27 November 2005 (aged 82)
- Occupations: Journalist, politician
- Known for: Founded The Republicans

Franz Xaver Schönhuber (10 January 1923 – 27 November 2005) was a German right-wing political activist journalist, politician, and author. He gained fame as a founder and eventual chairman of the right-wing German party The Republicans. He was a member of the Waffen-SS during World War II.

== Career ==
Schönhuber attended Gymnasium in Munich and gained his Abitur in 1942. As a nineteen-year-old he was a member of the Hitler Youth and a member of the Nazi Party. He voluntarily joined the Waffen-SS and was deployed at the front. He has claimed to have been an instructor and translator for the French Charlemagne brigade. As a SS-Unterscharführer, he gained a second class Iron Cross.

After the war during the denazification process, the Allies classified Schönhuber as a follower. He then began a career as a journalist and wrote for several established newspapers including the Münchner Abendzeitung and the Deutsche Woche. He was also chief editor for tz. At the same time, he hosted television programs for the Bayerischer Rundfunk, first Gute Fahrt and later Jetzt red' i. In 1975 he was the division leader of Bayerischer Rundfunk in the area of "Bavaria Information".

From 1975 to 1981 he was chairman of the Bayerischer Journalisten-Verband (Bavarian Journalist Union) and member of the Deutscher Presserat. His career was hit when in 1981 he published his autobiography Ich war dabei (I was there). He was accused of minimizing the grave crimes of National Socialism, although, within a lawsuit, he also won a determination that the book did not represent an identification with the Nazi regime. He was forced off his program and from the chairmanship of the Bayerischen Journalisten-Verband.

== Political career ==
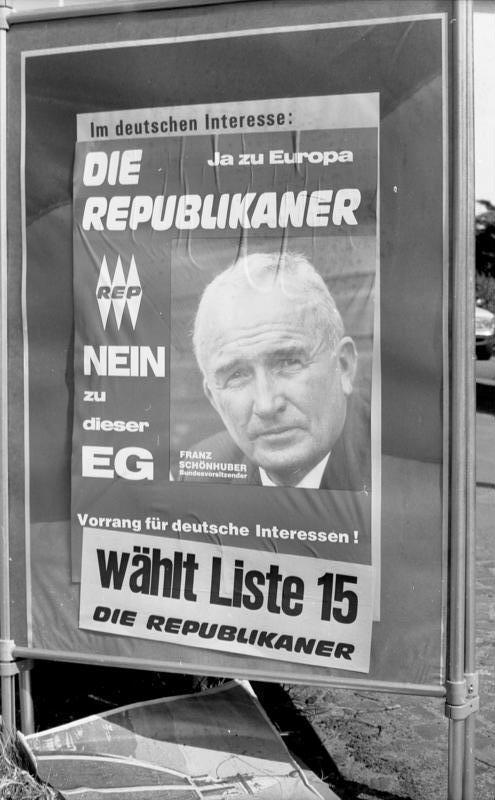
Poster campaign of the Republicans for the 1989 European election, featuring Franz Schönhuber

Together with former CSU deputies Franz Handlos and Ekkehard Voigt, Schönhuber founded the right-wing populist party "Die Republikaner" (The Republicans) in 1983 and became its acting chairman. In the 1980s, the party had substantial successes in the state and European elections. From 1989 to 1994, he was a deputy in the European Parliament. However, deteriorating results led to internal conflicts, and Schönhuber criticized several members of the party, including Harald Neubauer, for having had associations with the National Democratic Party (NPD), which was deemed to be at the same time too "Nazi-like" and too "leftist", in that it proposed major socialist popular reform plans not shared by Schönhuber's more bourgeois-nationalist and more conservative Republicans. Later on, Schönhuber would take back his harsh criticism of the NPD and its primary politicians. Schönhuber was forced to give up his post as party chairman on 25 May 1990.

With the help of his many supporters, he was made Bundesvorsitzender in 1990, but was again unseated four years later because of contacts with DVU-chairman Gerhard Frey.

In 1998, he was a candidate for the German Bundestag with the Deutsche Volksunion. In 2001, together with Horst Mahler, he published the book Schluss mit dem deutschen Selbsthass (An End To German Self-Hatred). He also wrote for the Deutsche Nationalzeitung and the magazine Nation und Europa.

After the death of Kerstin Lorenz in September 2005, the NPD made Schönhuber the direct candidate in the election district of Dresden I for the German federal election in 2005. As a direct candidate, he received 2.42% of the votes.

== Publications ==
- Ich war dabei
- Freunde in der Not
- Macht
- Trotz allem Deutschland
- Die Türken
- In Acht und Bann
- Die verbogene Gesellschaft
- Le Pen - Der Rebell
- Woher? Wohin? Europas Patrioten
- Schluß mit deutschem Selbsthaß (together with Horst Mahler)
- Welche Chancen hat die Rechte?
- Der missbrauchte Patriotismus
- Die Volksverdummer - Persönliche Erfahrungen mit deutschen Medienleuten

Political offices
Preceded by Franz Handlos	Leader of the Republicans; 1985–1994	Succeeded by Rolf Schlierer
