= German People's Union =

Nationalist political party in Germany

German People's Union Deutsche Volksunion
- Leader: Matthias Faust
- Founded: 1971; 55 years ago
- Dissolved: 1 January 2011; 15 years ago
- Split from: National Democratic Party
- Merged into: National Democratic Party
- Headquarters: Munich, Germany
- Ideology: German nationalism Pan-Germanism National conservatism; Right-wing populism
- Political position: Far-right
- European affiliation: Euronat
- Colours: Black Red Gold

The German People's Union (German: Deutsche Volksunion, DVU, also Liste D) was a far-right nationalist political party in Germany. It was founded by publisher Gerhard Frey as an informal association in 1971 and established as a party in 1987. In 2011, it merged with the National Democratic Party of Germany (NPD).

The party never reached the five-percent minimum in federal elections that is generally necessary to enter the Bundestag. The DVU won seats in several state parliaments.

The party, throughout its history, was financially completely dependent on Frey, something that caused it to be dubbed "Frey's Party".

== History ==
The DVU was formed as an association, not a party, by Gerhard Frey and twelve others, former members of other right-wing organisations or conservative parties as well as from various groups in the Federation of Expellees. In the early years, before the organisation became a party in 1987, it was predominantly active in propagating negationist views about the Holocaust and Germany's role in World War II, predominately through Frey's media empire and his National Zeitung.

With the decline of the far-right National Democratic Party of Germany, the NPD, from 1969 onward, the German People's Union became a new home for many former supporters of this party. The DVU, however, stayed away from party politics and instead organised protest marches against the German government's Ostpolitik, the rapprochement with Poland and Eastern Europe. It formed a number of action committees:

- Volksbewegung für Generalamnestie (1979) – People's Movement for General Amnesty
- Initiative für Ausländerbegrenzung (1980) – Initiative for the limitation of foreigners
- Aktion deutsches Radio und Fernsehen (1981) – German action for radio and television
- Ehrenbund Rudel - Gemeinschaft zum Schutz der Frontsoldaten (1983) – Honour federation Rudel – Community for the protection of the front soldiers (named after Hans-Ulrich Rudel and established during a memorial service after the latter's death)
- Deutschen Schutzbund für Volk und Kultur – German Protective Association for People and Culture
- Aktion Oder-Neiße - Action Oder-Neisse

DVU support in the 1998 German federal election

Membership in the DVU fluctuated in the following years but stood at 12,000 by 1986, making it the largest registered far-right organisation in Germany at the time. On 5 March 1987, the association became a party with the help of a large number of former NPD officials, something Frey had started planning the year before. Initially the party was called Deutsche Volksliste, which soon changed to Deutsche Volksunion-Liste D and, in 1991, just Deutsche Volksunion.

Frey's official reason for forming a party at the time was his disappointment with the German conservative-liberal Federal Government in regards to foreigners, security and policy towards East Germany. The new party formed an alliance with the NPD, generally agreeing not to compete with each other in elections. The DVU was financially well-off, courtesy of Frey's personal wealth, but lacked election expertise, while the NPD had the latter but was financially weak.

In September 1987, the DVU became the first far-right party in Germany in 20 years to win a seat in a state parliament when it entered the Parliament of Bremen, courtesy to winning 5.4 percent of the votes in Bremerhaven. Despite missing the five percent cut off in Bremen overall, gaining only 3.41 percent of the vote in the city-state, the special provisions in Bremen allowed for a party to enter parliament if it passed the five percent mark in one of the two parts of the state. Frey had spent more money on the Bremen campaign than the major party in the state combined and benefited from targeting protest voters.

Karl Heinz Sendbühler, a high-ranking member of the NPD, stated in 1989 that, with Frey's money, the charisma of Franz Schönhuber, leader of The Republicans at the time, and the NPD organisation, no German parliament would be safe from such an alliance. However, the personal dislike between Schönhuber and Frey made such an alliance impossible, with Frey accusing Schönhuber of being in league with the German conservatives while the latter called Frey a trader of devotional articles.

DVU support in the 2009 European Parliament election in Germany

Frey continued to spend heavily on elections, investing DM 17 million on the 1989 European Parliament election, but winning only 1.6 percent of the votes in Germany, compared to 7.1 percent for their right-wing competitors, The Republicans (REP). Despite this financial and political defeat, the DVU expanded its membership to 25,000 by 1989, and won six seats in the Parliament of Bremen in 1991, becoming the third-largest party there. In the following year it won 6.3 percent in the state elections in Schleswig-Holstein but failed to win seats in the Hamburg state election in September 1993, where competition between the DVU and REP kept both out of parliament.

By 1994, the DVU was in a financially difficult situation while also experiencing a breakdown of relations with the NPD. A short-term alliance with the REP did not last and it was unable to compete in elections for a time. The DVU membership declined and it lost its seats in the Bremen election of 1995, despite spending DM 2 million on the campaign. After losing its seats in Schleswig-Holstein the following year it achieved a better result in Hamburg in 1997, gaining 4,97 percent of the votes, just 190 votes short of earning seats in the state parliament.

Frey attempted to form alliances with the other two major far-right and right-wing parties in Germany but was rebuffed by the REP as being too extremist and by the NPD as being too moderate and business-orientated. In 1998 the DVU achieved its greatest election success, winning 12.8 percent, 16 seats, in Saxony-Anhalt, and a quarter of all votes of the young voters aged 18 to 25. However, by the following year, the DVU fraction was split by infighting and a number of the party's members of parliament left the DVU.

The final years of the party saw it lose a substantial number of members and the aging of the remainder. By the time of its merger with the NPD in 2010 the party had just 3,000 members, half the number the NPD had.

In 2004, the DVU entered a non-competition agreement with the NPD for the state elections in Brandenburg and Saxony. Both parties passed the five-percent threshold in their respective states. The DVU reached 6.1 percent in the Brandenburg state elections, and the NPD won 9.2 percent in the Saxony state elections. After this relatively successful election, the parties formed an electoral alliance for the 2005 federal elections. The joint NPD-DVU slate, which ran under the NPD's ballot line, won 1.6 percent of the total votes nationally.

In 2009, party founder Frey did not run for reelection as chairman and was replaced by Matthias Faust. In 2010, a referendum of party members approved a merger of the DVU and the NPD. Several state sections of the DVU objected to the merger and achieved a preliminary injunction from the Landgericht Munich based on irregularities during the referendum. On May 26, 2012, these objections were withdrawn and the DVU was declared defunct. Several branches and individuals objected to the perceived links between the NPD and Nazism and instead joined with the smaller party the Republicans, who were considered more moderate. This was especially true in North Rhine Westphalia and Bavaria, where the Republicans were traditionally strongest. Some other individuals formed a new party called Die Rechte (meaning "the Right").

== Assessment ==
The party was, from the start, under observation by the German Federal Office for the Protection of the Constitution, who declared the party's policies to be in violation of the German constitution. The DVU was classified as xenophobic, nationalistic, historical revisionist and as a protest party against the alleged failure of the mainstream political parties.

DVU candidates in state elections rarely made appearances, remaining in the background. Instead of election rallies, the party invested in posters and flyers, targeting protest voters. Candidates for state elections were hand-picked by Frey after private interviews, and not elected by the party.

Because of Frey's authoritarian leadership, the DVU was often dubbed the "Frey Party" and its financial dependence on Frey ensured that independent party activities were impossible. DVU fractions in state parliaments soon fractured because of Frey's overreaching control and the party soon folded after Frey stepped down in 2009. The Irish Times, after the party's success in the 1998 Saxony-Anhalt state elections, described the DVU as "less a political party than the dangerous plaything of a millionaire", without any real party structure. At the time, Frey's personal fortune was estimated to be in excess of DM 500 million.

== Election results ==
=== Federal Parliament (Bundestag) ===
Election	Party list		Seats	+/–	Status
Election	Votes	%	Seats	+/–	Status
1998	601,192	1.22	0 / 631	New	Extra-parliamentary
2009	45,752	0.11	0 / 631	New	Extra-parliamentary

=== European Parliament ===
Election	Votes	%	Seats	+/–	EP Group
1989	444,921	1.58 (#6)	0 / 99		NI
2009	111,695	0.42 (#13)	0 / 99		NI
