= The Republicans (Germany) =

The Republicans Die Republikaner
- Abbreviation: REP
- Leader: Tilo Schöne
- Founded: 26 November 1983; 42 years ago
- Split from: Christian Social Union
- Headquarters: Munich, Bavaria
- Membership (2014): 4,533
- Ideology: National conservatism; Right-wing populism; Hard Euroscepticism
- Political position: Right-wing to far-right
- Colours: Black Red Yellow (German Republic colours); Blue (customary)

Website
- www.rep.de

The Republicans (German: Die Republikaner, REP) is a national-conservative political party in Germany. The primary plank of the programme is opposition to immigration. The party tends to attract protest voters who think that the Christian Democratic Union (CDU) and the Christian Social Union of Bavaria (CSU) are not sufficiently conservative. It was founded in 1983 by former CSU members Franz Handlos and Ekkehard Voigt, and Franz Schönhuber was the party's leader from 1985 to 1994. The party had later been led by Rolf Schlierer, until 2014. The Republicans had seats in the European Parliament between 1989 and 1994, Abgeordnetenhaus of West Berlin in 1989–1990 and in the parliament of the German state of Baden-Württemberg between 1991 and 2001.

The German Federal Office for the Protection of the Constitution between 1992 and 2006 said that the Republicans were a "party with partially extreme-right tendencies" although the Republican leadership did rebuff an electoral alliance with more openly extreme-right parties such as the National Democratic Party of Germany, losing members to these more successful parties. The Republicans' strongholds tended to be in relatively affluent South Germany rather than the more economically depressed Eastern Germany where the more radical right-wing parties tended to do well.

In the 2013 federal elections, the Republicans received only 0.2 percent of the total national vote.

== History ==
=== Background ===
The CDU/CSU parties witnessed increasing dissatisfaction of their right wing in the 1980s, while at the same time the extreme-right National Democratic Party of Germany (NPD) was in decline. The CDU/CSU policies of European integration and acceptance of the Ostpolitik led to much criticism initially. Finally, in 1983, in complete breach of the party's long-term opposition to measures that could stabilize the economy of East Germany (GDR), CSU leader Franz Josef Strauss supported a credit of more than ten billion Deutsche Mark to the country. This led several members of the CSU to leave the party, including Members of Parliament Franz Handlos and Ekkehard Voigt.

=== Formation and Handlos leadership ===
The Republicans was formed in a Bavarian tavern on 17 November 1983 by CSU defectors and MPs Franz Handlos and Ekkehard Voigt, and former radio journalist and television talk show host Franz Schönhuber, with a past in the NSDAP and Waffen-SS. Handlos was chosen as the party's first leader, while Voigt and Schönhuber became his deputies. The party was initially considered both by itself and by the media as a Rechtsabspaltung (right-wing splinter) of the CSU. In its early years, the party was able to profit from dissatisfaction with the CSU due to its alleged abuse of power, patronage and limited internal democracy.

Similar to what CSU-leader Strauss had long threatened the sister party CDU with, Handlos wanted to make the Republicans into a bundesweite (federal) right-wing conservative party that would contest elections in the whole of (West) Germany. Schönhuber in turn wanted a more right-wing populist party inspired by the successes of the French National Front. This led to a fierce power struggle, in which Handlos accused Schönhuber of seeking to put the party on a course towards right-wing extremism. Failing in his attempt to expel Schönhuber, Handlos instead resigned from the party, followed by Voigt a year later. Schönhuber was subsequently elected chairperson of the party in June 1985, with former NPD member Harald Neubauer as his party secretary. This strengthened media allegations that the party was right-wing extremist rather than right-wing conservative.

=== Schönhuber leadership (1985–1994) ===
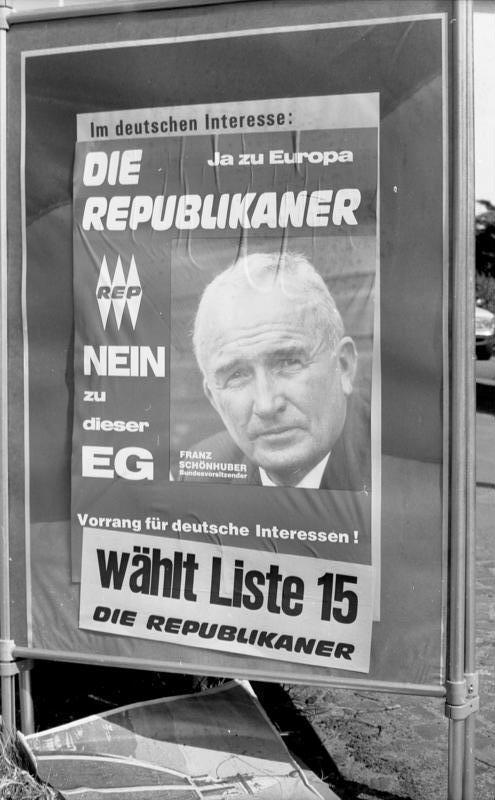
Poster campaign of the Republicans for the 1989 European election, featuring Franz Schönhuber

The party's first election, the 1986 Bavarian state election, gave the party financial campaign support, which it used to strengthen its organisation; by 1987 it had chapters in all but one West German state. In the election, it nevertheless failed to beat the 5% threshold with its 3.1% support. Outside Bavaria, the party gained less support, and ended up behind both main extreme-right parties, the NPD and the German People's Union (DVU). The Republicans chose not to contest the 1987 federal election as it considered itself too weak, and CSU leader Strauss adopted some of Schönhuber's rhetoric to win back voters. When prospects of German unification became more realistic, the Republicans started to see political success, and the year 1989 marked the party's electoral breakthrough. The party won 7.8% of the vote in the January 1989 election in West Berlin, giving it eleven local seats. In the European Parliament election in June later the same year, it won 7.1% of the vote and six seats. Its strongest showing was in Bavaria, where it won 14.6% of the vote.

From the start to the end of 1989, the membership of the Republicans increased from 8,500 to 25,000. At the same time, hundreds of editorials, articles and books were written about the party, including some that speculated that it could become the fifth party of the German party system. The party gained some support among the right wing of the CDU/CSU, and was even considered by some as a possible future coalition partner. Although some experts argued that the Republicans still was a democratic right-wing party, the majority considered that the party was part of the extreme-right.

The Republicans lost its electoral gains in the 1990s as it was torn by internal strife, scandals, and failure to attract voters in former East Germany after the reunification. It contested fourteen elections between 1990 and 1991, but never surpassed the 5% threshold (although it came close in the Bavarian state election with 4.9% of the vote). Internal strife led the leadership of two state branches of the party to be collectively discharged in 1989, and in 1990, open conflict erupted between the 'moderate' Schönhuber and 'extremist' Neubauer. Schönhuber briefly resigned as party leader, until he was reinstated two months later by a majority of the party delegates. After this, the extremists, including Neubauer, were purged from the party leadership, and Neubauer was replaced by the moderate, national-conservative Rolf Schlierer.

Although the party seemed poised to disappear in the beginning of the 1990s, it won a surprising result in the April 1992 state election in Baden-Württemberg. In the election, in which the party was headed by Schlierer, the Republicans won 10.9% of the vote and fifteen seats, and became the third largest party in the state. The party still failed to breach the 5% threshold in subsequent elections, although it won as much as 4.8% in the 1993 Hamburg state council election. Lack of further electoral successes resulted in new strife between the party's moderates and radicals, and in December 1992, the Federal Office for the Protection of the Constitution decided to start surveillance of the party, categorizing it as a "party with partially extreme-right tendencies". Disgruntled by the poor showings in the 1994 "super election year", Schönhuber to much surprise agreed to establish cooperations with the DVU, a party that had always been denounced as "extreme-right" by the Republicans. The Republican leadership in turn hastily convened and dismissed Schönhuber as party leader, replacing him with Schlierer.

=== Schlierer leadership (1994–2014) ===
The mid-1990s was marked by open conflict between the Schönhuber and Schlierer factions. While Schönhuber sought a "united right-wing" model for the party, Schlierer wanted clear distance to "extremists". Schönhuber resigned from the party altogether in 1995, and the party subsequently contested a series of unsuccessful state elections. The litmus test for Schlierer's leadership occurred in the state election in Baden-Württemberg in March 1996, for which he had stated many times that he would resign as party leader if the party failed to get reelected to the state parliament. Schlierer eventually succeeded in his goal, against most expectations, as the Republicans won 9.1% of the vote and fourteen seats. In the following years, election results for the party again dropped, and in the 1999 European Parliament election it won just 1.7% of the vote.

The German Federal Office for the Protection of the Constitution stopped monitoring the party in 2006, something they had been doing since 1992. The Republican leadership rebuffed the offer of an electoral alliance with two more successful parties that were later to merge, the National Democratic Party of Germany (NPD) and the German People's Union (DVU), due to their openly extreme-right positions. For years and especially under Schlierer's leadership, the party has lost far-right members to the DVU and NPD. The strongholds for the Republicans also differ from those of the more radical right-wing parties, with the former being strongest in the relatively affluent South Germany whilst the latter have had most success in the more economically depressed Eastern Germany.

In the 2009 federal elections, the Republicans received 0.4 percent of the total national vote. Its strongest showing was in the states of Rhineland-Palatinate and Baden-Württemberg, in which it received 1.1 percent of the vote. In the 2013 federal elections, the Republicans received 0.2 percent of the total national vote.

=== Since 2014 ===
The Republicans has lost support to Alternative for Germany (AfD) from 2014 onwards, with former Republican leader Rolf Schlierer leaving the Republicans, expressing support for the AfD and stating the AfD had largely adopted the same program as the Republicans.

In 2018, several members of the AfD in Saarland switched to the Republicans due to concerns that the AfD was shifting too far to the right.

== Ideology ==
Initially, the Republicans was a conservative party close to the CSU, with a moderate nationalist approach. When Schönhuber became leader of the party, it radicalised and became increasingly nationalist. His positions included abolishing trade unions, reducing the welfare state, expelling all foreigners and returning to Germany's 1937 borders. The latter included campaigning for the unification of the then-existing West and East Germany, which helped boost the party's popularity in the late 1980s. The party also attacked the European Union as an infringement of German sovereignty following the enactment of the Maastricht Treaty. The ideology of the Republicans is mainly characterised by nationalism, although the party itself rejects such a label, instead regarding itself as "national" or "patriotic".

=== German nationalism ===
From its outset, the party saw German reunification as its foremost goal. The party welcomed the reunification when it occurred in 1990, but considered it to only be a "small reunification" of West Germany and "Central Germany", as the party considered the real East Germany to be the Ostgebiete, namely the former German territories in Poland and Russia. The party saw the 1990 reunification only as a first step towards "full reunification", which would be the return to Germany's 1937 borders. It sought to accomplish a "peaceful completion of German unity" through negotiations and treaties with these states. The party did not however strive for the inclusion of all groups it considered as part of the German ethnic community, such as Austrians, South Tyroleans and Transylvanian Saxons.

=== Economy ===
The economic policies of the Republicans are largely derived from those of the CSU, and its social market economy. The party additionally wants to reduce the size of bureaucracy and state subsidies. The early programmes of the party sought to protect German agriculture, the middle classes, as well as German small businesses from big corporations and monopolisation. From the 1990s, the party increasingly started to promote the interests of the lower classes. While it maintained a neo-liberal discourse and calls for budget cuts, it began promoting welfare chauvinism, namely only funding German interests. It also included criticising asylum seekers, immigrants and the European Union for taking away too much German money.

=== Immigration ===
The Republicans have criticised immigration since its foundation, but the initial relatively moderate discourse became increasingly radical and outspoken under Schönhuber and Neubauer, as well as becoming one of the major topics of party literature. The party highlighted the topic of asylum seekers in the 1980s, when it generally had little importance in German political debate. As the number of asylum seekers increased significantly in the 1990s, so did media attention on a number of controversies, and the major German parties agreed on a stricter asylum law in December 1992. The party welcomed the tightening of the rules, but continued to advocate stricter laws and criticise the still high arrival numbers of what it considered as "sham refugees". The party criticised Muslims in particular for being fundamentalist and not willing to be integrated, expanding their sub-culture all over Europe.

=== Foreign policy ===
In its first programme, the Republicans fully supported European integration, with the long-term goal of turning into a federal state. Since the signing of the Maastricht Treaty, opposition to the European Union has become one of the party's most important issues, and it turned to support a confederal state instead of a federal one. The party perceives the international community to be especially hostile towards Germany, and criticises what it considers to be certain limitations of Germany's sovereignty.

== Organization ==
=== Leadership ===
- Franz Handlos (1983–1985)
- Franz Schönhuber (1985–1994)
- Rolf Schlierer (1994–2014)
- Johann Gärtner (2014–2016)
- Kevin Krieger (2016–2019)
- Michael Felgenheuer (2019)
- Tilo Schöne (since 2019)

=== International relations ===
The Republicans has never been particularly active in establishing relations with other parties internationally. After being elected to the European Parliament in 1989, it briefly teamed up in the European Right group with the French National Front (FN) and the Belgian Vlaams Blok. Together with the Vlaams Blok, the Republicans sought to move the FN away from the Italian Social Movement, which was in conflict with the Republicans over the territorial dispute of South Tyrol. The Republicans' alliance with these parties however ended already in 1990, when they accepted Neubauer's DVU instead of the Republicans in the European Right group. After the fall of communism in Eastern Europe, the Republicans was also briefly the inspiration for some short-lived initiatives in countries including Hungary, Ukraine, Latvia and Czechoslovakia.

== Election results ==
=== Bundestag ===
Bundestag
| Election year | # of total votes | % of overall vote | # of seats |
|---|---|---|---|
| 1990 | 987,269 | 2.1% | 0 |
| 1994 | 875,239 | 1.9% | 0 |
| 1998 | 906,383 | 1.8% | 0 |
| 2002 | 280,671 | 0.6% | 0 |
| 2005 | 266,101 | 0.6% | 0 |
| 2009 | 193,396 | 0.4% | 0 |
| 2013 | 91,193 | 0.2% | 0 |

Graph showing the support for the Republicans in European Parliament elections

=== European Parliament ===
REP support in the 2004 European Parliament election in Germany

European Parliament
| Election year | # of total votes | % of overall vote | # of seats |
|---|---|---|---|
| 1989 | 2,008,629 | 7.1% | 6 |
| 1994 | 1,387,070 | 3.9% | 0 |
| 1999 | 461,038 | 1.7% | 0 |
| 2004 | 485,662 | 1.9% | 0 |
| 2009 | 347,887 | 1.3% | 0 |
| 2014 | 109,757 | 0.4% | 0 |

== Bibliography ==
- Betz, Hans-Georg (October 1990). "Politics of Resentment: Right-Wing Radicalism in West Germany". Comparative Politics. 23 (1): 45–60. doi:10.2307/422304. JSTOR 422304.
- Mudde, Cas (2003). "Die Republikaner". The ideology of the extreme right. Manchester University Press. pp. 31–59. ISBN 0-7190-6446-5.
