= Franz Ernst Schütte =

German entrepreneur-businessman

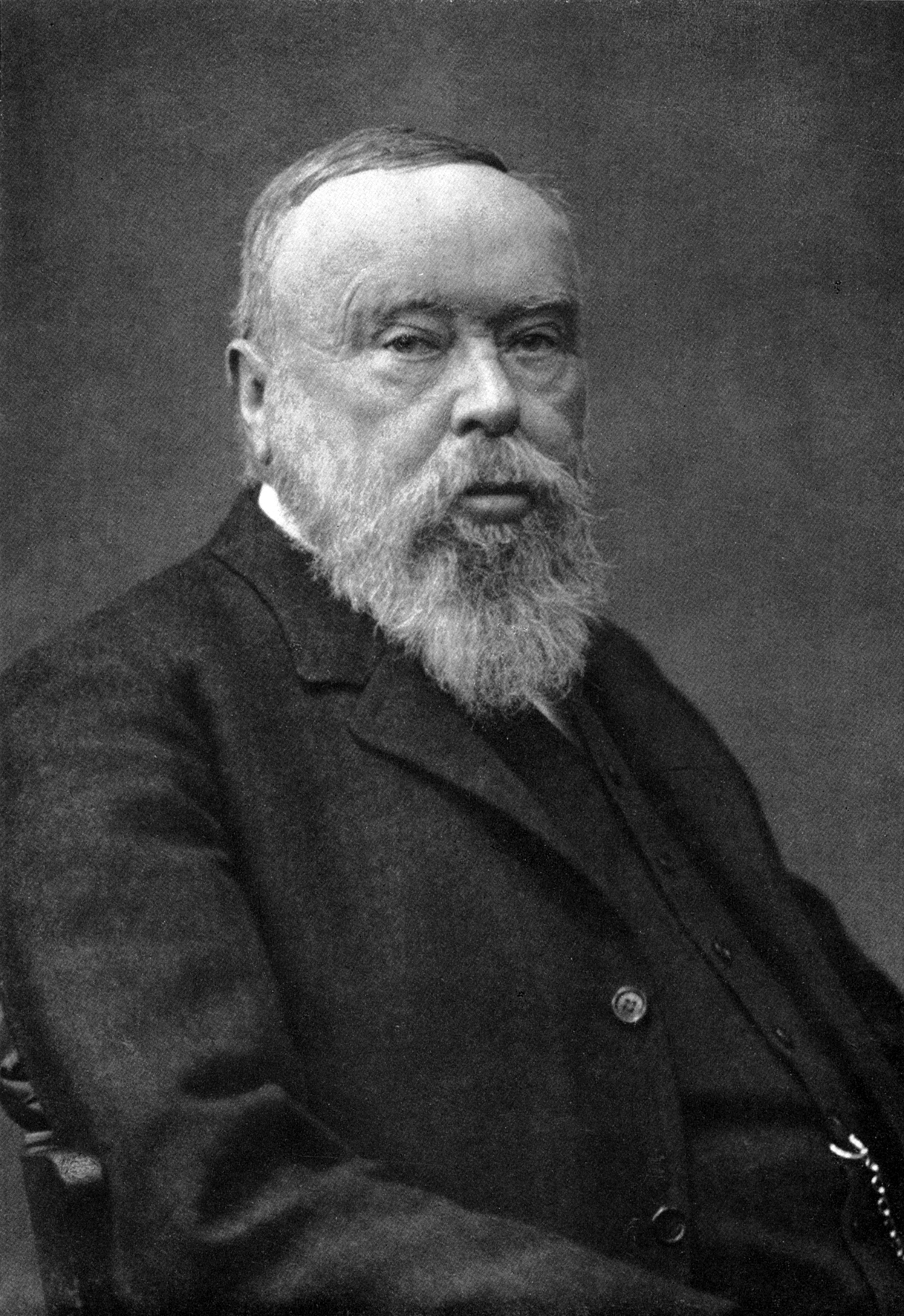
- Born: 21 November 1836; Bremen, German Confederation
- Died: 1 February 1911 (aged 74); Bremen, German empire
- Occupations: Entrepreneur-Businessman; Civic patron-benefactor
- Known for: Being "The Petroleum King" through the operations of the German-American Petroleum Company
- Parents: Albrecht Nicolaus Schütte (1799–1862) (father); Louise Regine Walte (1812–69) (mother)

Franz Ernst Schütte (21 November 1836 – 1 February 1911) was a German entrepreneur-businessman who during his lifetime became celebrated for the extent of his wealth.

Although his business activities extended across several different sectors, including shipbuilding and land reclamation-development, it was on account of his oil importing activities, which included the establishment of the "Deutsch-Amerikanische Petroleum Gesellschaft" (DAPG / "German-American Petroleum Company") in 1890, that Schütte acquired the popular soubriquet "The Petroleum King". (The DAPG company was renamed "Esso AG" in 1950.)

In his home city Schütte is also remembered as a massively effective Bremen benefactor, both through his own donations and through his effectiveness as a fund raiser among fellow members of the city's business elite, during what was a period of unprecedented commercial expansion. The city owes its "new" city hall and its Botanical Gardens to his philanthropy, along with the rebuilding between 1888 and 1901 of the west end of Bremen Cathedral in the confident "Gothic revival" style favoured for prestigious public buildings in central and western Europe during this period.

== Provenance and early years ==
Franz Schütte was born in Bremen, the son of businessman Albrecht Nicolaus Schütte (1799–1862) by his marriage to the lawyer's daughter Louise Regine Walte (1812–1869). Franz was the eldest of his parents' five recorded children. He completed a commercial apprenticeship with the tobacco company Lüttge und Horst, and then, accompanied by his younger brother Carl, undertook a length stay in the United States in order further to expand his and his brother's business knowledge and understanding.

== Career ==
His father died in March 1862, by which time Franz and Carl Schütte were back in Germany. Franz Schütte had been a part-owner of the family business since January 1861. The brothers now took over at "Handelshaus Albt. Nic. Schütte & Sohn". At this stage the company's principal activity involved the importation to northern Europe of tobacco, but there were already growing quantities of other US imports traded, as the rapid development of rail transport and the increasing reliability of transatlantic shipping opened up world commodity markets to US agriculture.

=== The rise of "The Petroleum King" ===
The company had made its first foray into importing and marketing petroleum – at that time principally used as a lighting fuel and lubricant - from Pennsylvania in 1858. During 1863 and 1864 the focus of the entire business switched to petroleum importation. The market grew rapidly: within it "Handelshaus Albt. Nic. Schütte & Sohn" also grew, becoming, the most important petroleum trading company in Germany by the end of the century. The nature of the business involved working closely with the shipping magnate Wilhelm Anton Riedemann (1832–1919). During the earlier 1880s the petroleum was transported in barrels on steam freighters. In 1886, for the first time, a consignment of petroleum destined for distribution by Schütte crossed the Atlantic in the "Glückauf", the first German-owned (although it had to be "converted in England") ocean going oil tanker. The "Glückauf", considered by German ship builders to be based on a fatally flawed concept, given the combination in close proximity of a cargo of combustible oil with a "fire powered" propulsion system, turned out to be the prototype for several generations of oil tankers and "super tankers" that would ply the world's oceans through the twentieth century and beyond its end. By 1889 there were fifteen oil tankers, and the traditional practice of storing petroleum in barrels in warehouses had been superseded by the use of large purpose-built oil-reservoirs. Over time competitors would adopt similar practices, but throughout the 1890s (and in many respects for much longer) the business retained a massive competitive advantage over putative competitors. The capital investment necessary was massive, but once the investment had been made, the company seems to have been extraordinarily lucrative for its owners, both in Germany and internationally.

In 1890 the Schütte brothers teamed up with Riedemann and the stateside oil magnate John D. Rockefeller to found the "Deutsch-Amerikanische Petroleum Gesellschaft" (DAPG / "German-American Petroleum Company"), an "Aktiengesellschaft" (loosely, "public limited company") in Bremen. From the outset the American investors were represented on the company's supervisory board and exercised very significant influence on the management of the business, although they were determined that the company should be seen as a German company; and it was not till 1904 that the New Jersey–based Standard Oil Company took a 50% holding in the DAPG. The DAPG company was renamed "Esso AG" in 1950. The next year saw the foundation in Venice of the "Società italo-americana del petrolio" (SIAP) by Benedetto Walter, jointly with Rockefeller. Three years later the "Petroleum Import Compagnie" (PICO) company was established with equivalent objectives in Zürich. The German and Italian companies both held significant shareholdings in the Swiss company, and all three worked closely together. The ownership structures of these and other companies set up with financial backing from Rockefeller, becoming increasingly complex between 1890 and 1910 in ways that combined cross-shareholdings with increasingly effective centralised coordination from New Jersey. Italian, Swiss and German companies would all be rebranded during the twentieth century with the "Esso" name.

=== Shipbuilding and related enterprises ===
In 1893 Schütte purchased the Shipyard at Vegesack which had been set up after 1805 by Johann Lange. With others, he used the site to set up what now became the "Bremer Vulkan Schiffbau und Maschinenfabrik in Vegesack" with an initial share capital of 300,000 marks. The new company was added as a Public Limited Company the Bremen companies register on 23 October 1893. Franz Schütte was the largest investor, with 20% of the share capital. Another major shareholder, with 8% of the company, was the ambitious engineer Victor Nawatzki, who was installed to run the business as "Generaldirektor", a position he would fill with conspicuous success through two decades of profitable expansion before assuming the chairmanship of the supervisory board. Schütte himself held the chairmanship of the supervisory board during the early years. The business remained profitable through much of the twentieth century, but then, following two decades of mergers, acquisitions and increasingly frantic restructuring across the European shipbuilding sector, collapsed in a high-profile bankruptcy in 1996/97.

Other businesses Schütte founded in the 1890s included the "Bremen-Vegesacker-Heringsfischereigesellschaft". In 1896 he teamed up with Friedrich Bischoff to set up the Argo Steamship company which concentrated on routes connecting Bremen with Scandinavia and the Levant. In 1899 Bremer Vulkan delivered Argo's first passenger ship, the eleven-passenger steam yacht Andrej Perwoswannij, designed and built for a long-term charter to the imperial Russian government.

=== Political involvement and other activities ===
Schütte joined the Bremen Chamber of Commerce in 1869, serving as its "Präses" (president) between 1876 and 1878. He used this as an opportunity to focus on the transport challenges facing Bremen and northern Germany more broadly. He was, in particular, supportive of the construction of a "Mittelland Canal". Work on the canal finally started in 1906.

In 1881 he took on the role of "Bauherr" for building and maintenance of the city's churches and especially, in this instance, for the cathedral, which had become degraded, through the passage of time, and through neglect. He pushed through a number of important restoration projects, securing the necessary funding and then personally overseeing planning and construction in respect of the more important ones.

Schütte became a member of the executive committee for the association looking after the city's parks and other open important spaces in 1876. Between 1877 and 1911 he chaired the association.

For not quite twelve years, between 1867 and 1878, he served as a member of the Bremen state parliament ("Bürgerschaft"). Three years after unification, in 1874, he also became Bremen's representative at the "Hanseatische Handelsstand" trade bureau, which now lobbied the government in Berlin to sustain that commitment to the international free trade under which the northern sea ports had prospered under the North German Confederation.

=== Bremen benefactor ===
Construction of the two towers at the west end of Bremen Cathedral and the repainting and decoration of the building's interior were funded by Schütte, partly out of his own pocket and partly through his fundraising activities. The stump of the south tower, which had collapsed in 1638, was completely removed in order that a stable replacement tower could be erected. It is thought some of the lower portions of the north tower were probably retained, with only the higher part of the tower needing to be rebuilt. The restoration was based on surviving images and technical drawings from the seventeenth century, but a certain amount of interpretation was also involved. Between 1888 and 1901 Schütte devoted considerable time and energy to funding and oversight of the restoration and reconstruction project.

In 1904 Schütte made a plot of land of slightly more than 4 hectares (9.9 acres) by the Osterdeich available for a term of 25 years for the creation of a Botanical Garden alongside the river on the edge of the city. The garden was set out by the young botanist Friedrich August Georg Bitter and the Swiss horticulturalist Ernst Nußbaumer. It opened in 1905 to widespread acclaim, with Bitter as its first director. Bitter later moved on to a professorship in Botany at Göttingen while Nußbaumer stayed in Bremen to progress the project. Unfortunately progress was halted and maintenance was neglected during the First World War: in 1923 - twelve years after the death of the original benefactor - the city took over the funding for its maintenance. Twelve years after that, in 1935, the Botanical Garden was relocated entirety to its present site, where it had been expanded to its present 3extent by approximately 1950.

He was a decisive financial backer for Bremen's Friedrich III memorial, contributing 150,000 marks of his own at a time when some were still unpersuaded as to whether the trouble and expense of erecting a full imperial memorial could really be justified for an emperor whose reign had lasted barely more than three months. Friedrich had been a controversial emperor who had reigned for just 99 days, during the latter part of 1888, before his death from throat cancer. Conservatives had mistrusted his liberal propensities, which many blamed on his strong willed (supposedly "English") wife. In Bremen, the erection of his memorial was appropriately contentious. When it came to planning the memorial Schütte found himself in intense disputation alongside the "progressive" museum director (and art critic) Gustav Pauli and opposed to the more traditionalist approach represented by the respected conservative artist Arthur Fitger. The whole business became caught up in a wider inter-generational clash within the Bremen artistic establishment. In the end the sculptor finally appointed by Schütte in 1902 to produce the statue, Louis Tuaillon, seems to have taken matters into his own hands. He departed extensively from the guidelines with which he had been provided, with results that seriously alarmed many in the senate. The late emperor had been reclothed, and now appeared on his (traditionally imperial) horse dressed as a Roman emperor. The result came uncomfortably close to one of the "heroic nudes" for which, in fairness, Tuaillon was already well-known. Fortunately the emperor liked it, however, stating that "he had never before seen his father so beautifully portrayed" (Note: "...noch nie habe er seinen Vater so schön aufgefasst gesehen".) Emperor Wilhelm personally took part in the formal unveiling of the monument on 22 March 1905.

In 1891 Schütte submitted proposals for the construction of a new and enlarged city hall. He commissioned detailed plans from Max Salzmann, the architect who, having won a competition for the contract, was already working on the comprehensive restoration of the northern facade of the city's cathedral across the former market square from the proposed site of the city hall extension. These plans were never implemented, so Schütte took a more direct approach with the senators. He purchased the plot of land in question from the city authorities for 2,500,000 marks, but included in the purchase contract the express condition that the city authorities must use the money to build the new administrative building as an extension to the existing city hall. Construction took place, following extensive wrangling, between 1909 and completion in 1913.

Schütte also took the lead, alongside the city's mayor Alfred Dominicus Pauli, in fund-raising for Bremen's Bismarck monument. A committee created to oversee the project held its first meeting just three weeks after the former Chancellor's death in 1898. When 207,000 Marks that had been collected were lost because of a bank collapse it was Schütte, supported by senators and fellow merchants, who managed within 48 hours to amass a sum equivalent to the monies lost through the failure of the "Stephan Lürman & Sohn" bank. He also commissioned and donated various slightly more discreetly located monumental fountains and statues to the city such as the Turmbläserbrunnen (loosely, "hornblowers fountain") by the cathedral and the "Rosselenker" (statue of a naked man with a horse) commissioned from Tuaillon, and placed by the city's medieval ramparts (now a focus of a city park).

Schütte's prodigious spending on the city was not restricted to tangible stone structures. He was also an effective supporter of the live arts and of education in Bremen. In 1902 he spent 100,000 marks to set up and endow the "Bremen Schiller foundation" ("bremische Schillerstiftung") to provide access for state school pupils to several theatre performances each year.

Despite the extent of his charitable giving while alive, Schütte still died a formidably wealthy man. There is no mention in sources of his having married or fathered any children, though by the time of his death he had nieces and nephews in abundance. Five years after he died, in 1916, his heirs set up the "Franz Schütte Foundation" which continues to fund a range of education and arts-related projects, targeting in particular young people with exceptional talents but without the money necessary to develop these properly.

== Recognition and celebration ==
Following his death at Bremen on 1 February 1911, Franz Schütte's mortal remains were buried at Bremen's Riensberger Cemetery, under a family-sized grave plot. On the surface, at one end of the grave, is the stone figure on an angel playing a lute. She is the work of Adolf von Hildebrand, one of the leading German sculptors of the time. The architects Carl Eeg and Eduard Runge each also had a hand in the design of the grave. The material used is Untersberger Marble. Despite the involvement of celebrated artistic figures in its execution and the use of expensive stone, the overall effect of the design is not over-elaborate.

- 1901: Bremen Medal of Honour in gold.
- A number of images of Schütte survive in Bremen. In the cathedral there are two depictions of him, along with two further depictions of the architect Max Salzmann, though neither of them expressed the wish for this. In the door to the north tower there is a relief of Noah's Arc by Peter Fuchs, Schütte is included as the second person from the right, holding a purse of money and a hammer. (Note: At least one source calls this portrayal "Franz Schütte as Noah") Salzmann, as "master-builder", is positioned next to him, holding a compass. In addition, on the south side of the north tower there is a sandstone bust of Schütte on a level with the top window opening. In an approximately opposite position on the north side of the south tower there is a plaster-cast bust of Salzmann. Elsewhere around the city centre there are a relief-tondo and another relief profile.
- 1913: The Bremen business community had a marble bust of Schütte placed in the city park, copied from an original by Adolf von Hildebrand which since 1953 has been housed in the Kunsthalle (art gallery), close to the Osterdeich and the original site of the Botanical Gardens.
- The tree-lined Franz-Schütte-Allee (street) in Bremen-Oberneuland is named in his honour.
