= German-American Petroleum Company =

German petroleum company

Deutsch-Amerikanische Petroleum Gesellschaft, also known as German-American Petroleum Company, was a German petroleum company that was a subsidiary of Standard Oil and was founded in 1890. From 1950 onwards the company was called Esso Deutschland GmbH and has been a subsidiary of the ExxonMobil group since 1999.

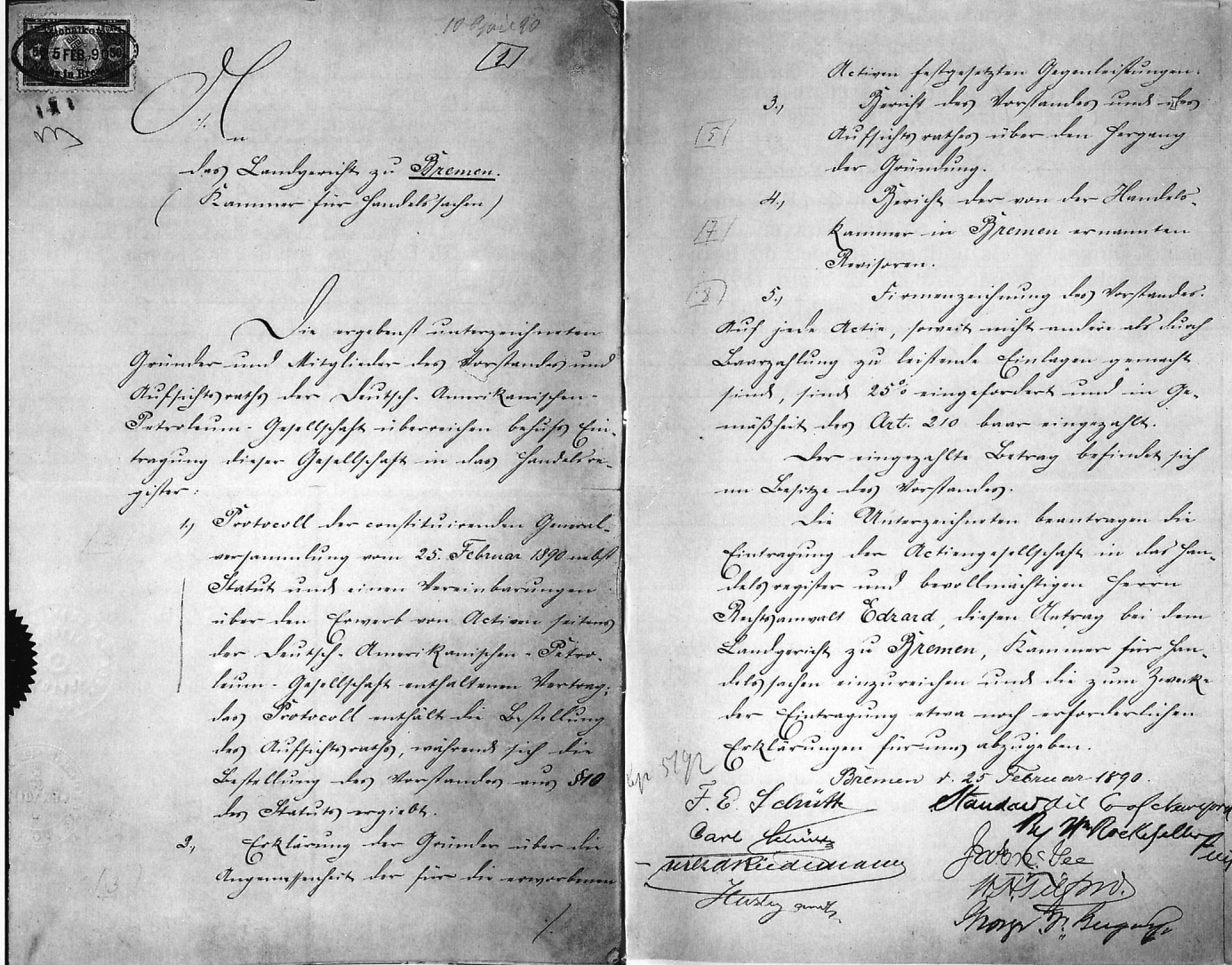
Founding document of the German-American Petroleum Society 1890

== History ==
Dapol sign

On 25 February 1890 a joint venture between the German industrialists Franz Ernst Schütte, Carl Schütte and Wilhelm Anton Riedemann and the American industrialist John D. Rockefeller was agreed in the German city of Bremen to create a subsidiary of Standard Oil that would operate as a petroleum business in Germany.

In 1891, the petrol import business of Edmund Siemers was transferred to the company In the mid-1890s, the company took over half of the shares of the Bremen Petroleum Refinery.

At the beginning of the 20th century, the petroleum was sold under the brand DAPOL and the American gasoline under the brand DAPOLIN with the famous Indian head. In 1904, the Standard Oil Company took a 50 percent stake in the company and moved the company's headquarters to Hamburg.

After the Benzene association scientist, Walter Oswald had developed a super-gasoline in 1924 by adding benzene to gasoline., a DAPG delivery agreement enabled them to also offer a knock-resistant super gasoline by adding about 40% benzene. This product was called Duolin and sold in September 1928 as red-coloured Esso. A 10% benzene was added to the dapoline fuel to increase the knock resistance.

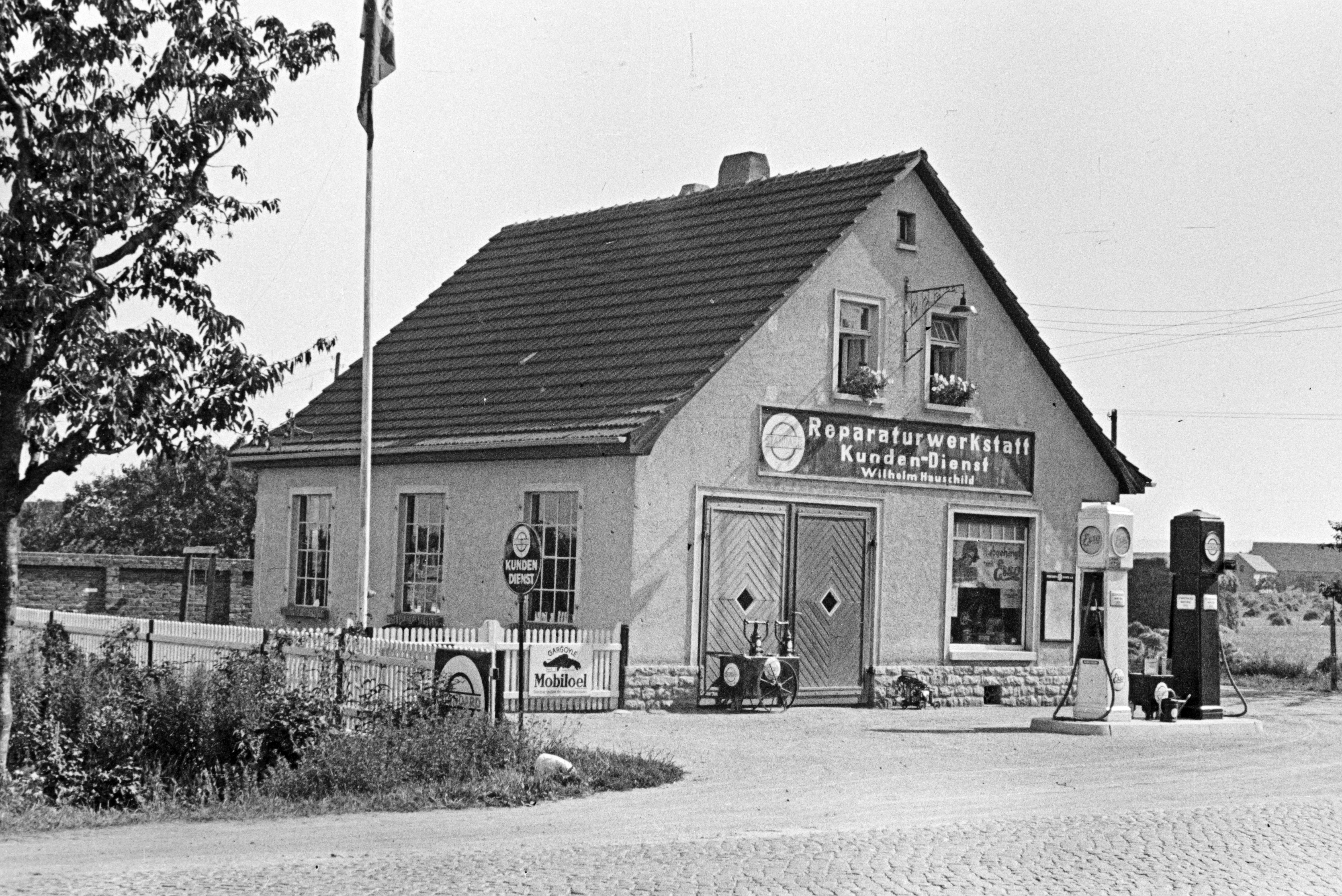
Workshop with Esso and Dapolin pump (early 1930s)

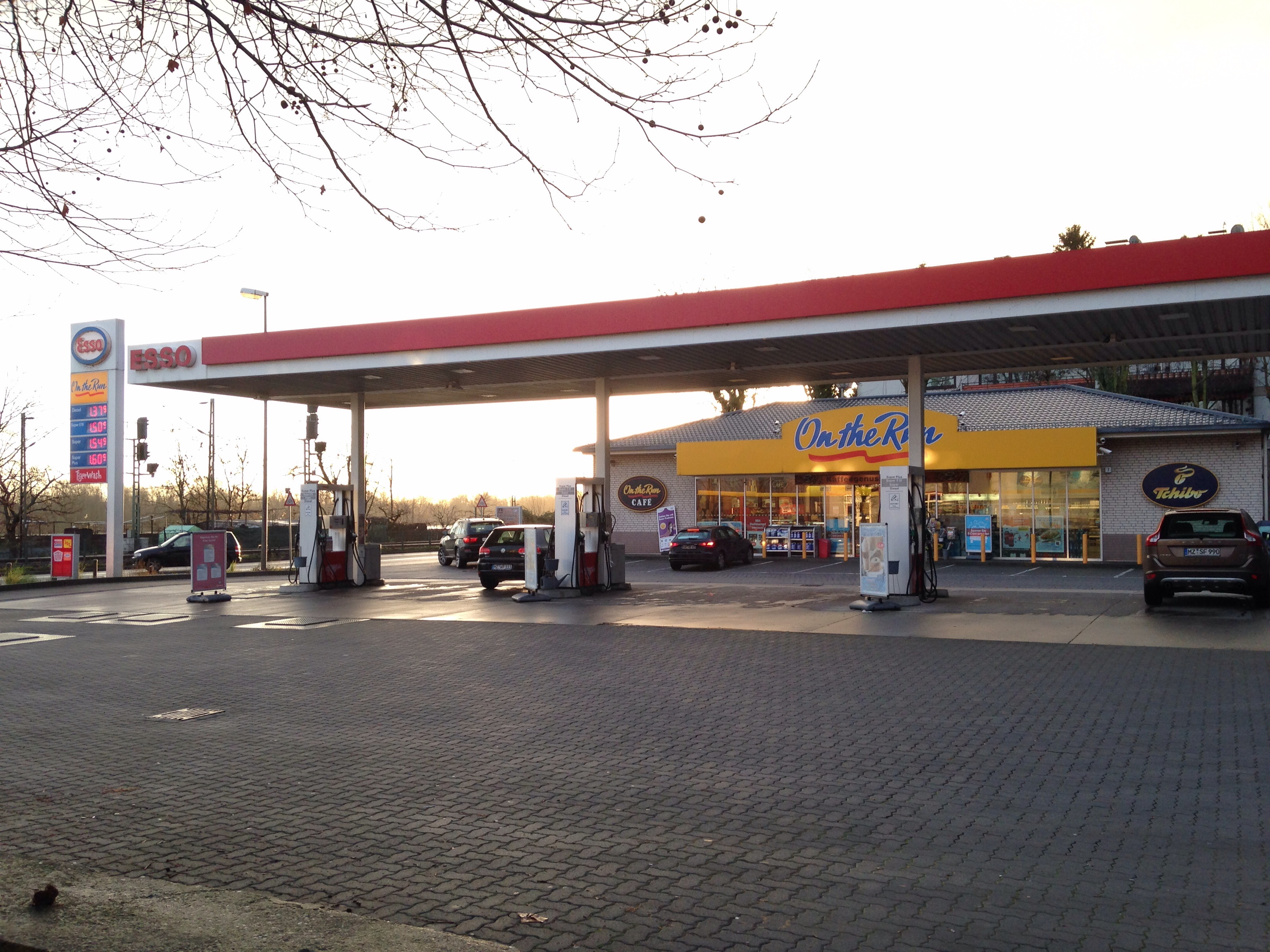
Esso filling station (2014)

In 1928 the tanker shipping company of the German-American Petroleum Society was renamed to the Waried Tankschiff Rhederei GmbH.

During the global economic crisis, the shares of MAN and Haniel in the Oelhag, the German petroleum company were bought by the German-American Petroleum Society and the German mineral oil company Rhenania-Ossag, that would be later called, Shell Germany Oil GmbH. ARCO, the American oil company sold so many shares at that time, that the three companies each owned a third of the shares.

In 1930, the supply regulation of potato spirit for fuel purposes came into force in Germany for all fuel companies. In each case, 2.5% by weight of the produced or imported quantity of fuel was to be obtained from the Reich monopoly administration. This rate increased gradually until October 1932 to 10%.

In 1931 DAPOLIN was renamed Standard Gasoline.

In 1935, the German-American Petroleum Company was the market leader in Germany among the Big Five petrol station chains with 18,327 petrol stations (32.7%) as well as with Rhenania-Ossag with a sales ratio of 20.9%.

During 1937-1938, the brand was renamed to ESSO. Later in 1938, the new ESSO brand was printed on the cover sheet of the drivers manual.

In 1938, German-American Petroleum Company and Rhenania-Ossag, with the help of their non-executable foreign exchange reserves, took over half of Oelhag. At this time, the Standard Oil of New Jersey owned 94% of the German-American Petroleum Society. As a result of the Anschluss of Austria in 1938 and the subsequent reorganization of the local industry, the Vacuum Oil Company was assigned to the German-American Petroleum Society along with its refinery in the Kagran area of Vienna

From 1938 onwards the company had holdings in Hydrierwerke Pölitz AG in Pölitz near Stettin, together with IG Farben, who responsible for the production of the chemical Zyklon B for gas chambers, and Rhenania-Ossag.

== World War II ==
At the start of World War II, the German economy was converted to a war footing and all petroleum distribution companies in the Association of Petroleum Distribution were merged. Only gasoline with no attached branding was sold. As the German-American Petroleum Company was still considered a German Company it was put on the List of Defense Contractors and received preferential material quotation. Two directors of the company, Karl Lindemann and Emil Helfferich were members of the Freundeskreis der Wirtschaft.

Oil production in the Reich expanded significantly during World War II, especially in the occupied countries - with Romania alone accounting for 3.3 million barrels in 1938 and producing 8 million barrels for German export in 1940—a staggering increase of 4.7 million barrels in only two years. The number of people employed in oil production grew substantially from 1939 to 1944, including many forced labourers and prisoners of war from Poland, Ukraine and the Soviet Union. German domestic oil production rose significantly during the course of the second world war, until allied bombing campaign in 1944. In January 1944, total synthetic petroleum output was approximately 3.6 million barrels. In June, the month after the Allied petroleum raids began, production dropped by one-third to 2.2 million barrels. By the end of 1944 it had dropped another one-third, plummeting to 1.2 million barrels.

== Modern period ==
The German-American Petroleum Company was renamed Esso AG in 1950 and then Esso Deutschland GmbH in 1999. It is now part of the ExxonMobil group.

The name Esso is the phonetic pronunciation of the initials 'S' and 'O' in the name Standard Oil.

== Literature ==
- Kleinmanns, Joachim (2002). Super, voll!: kleine Kulturgeschichte der Tankstelle (in German). Marburg : Jonas. ISBN 9783894452971.
