= Hans von Marées =

German painter (1837–1887)

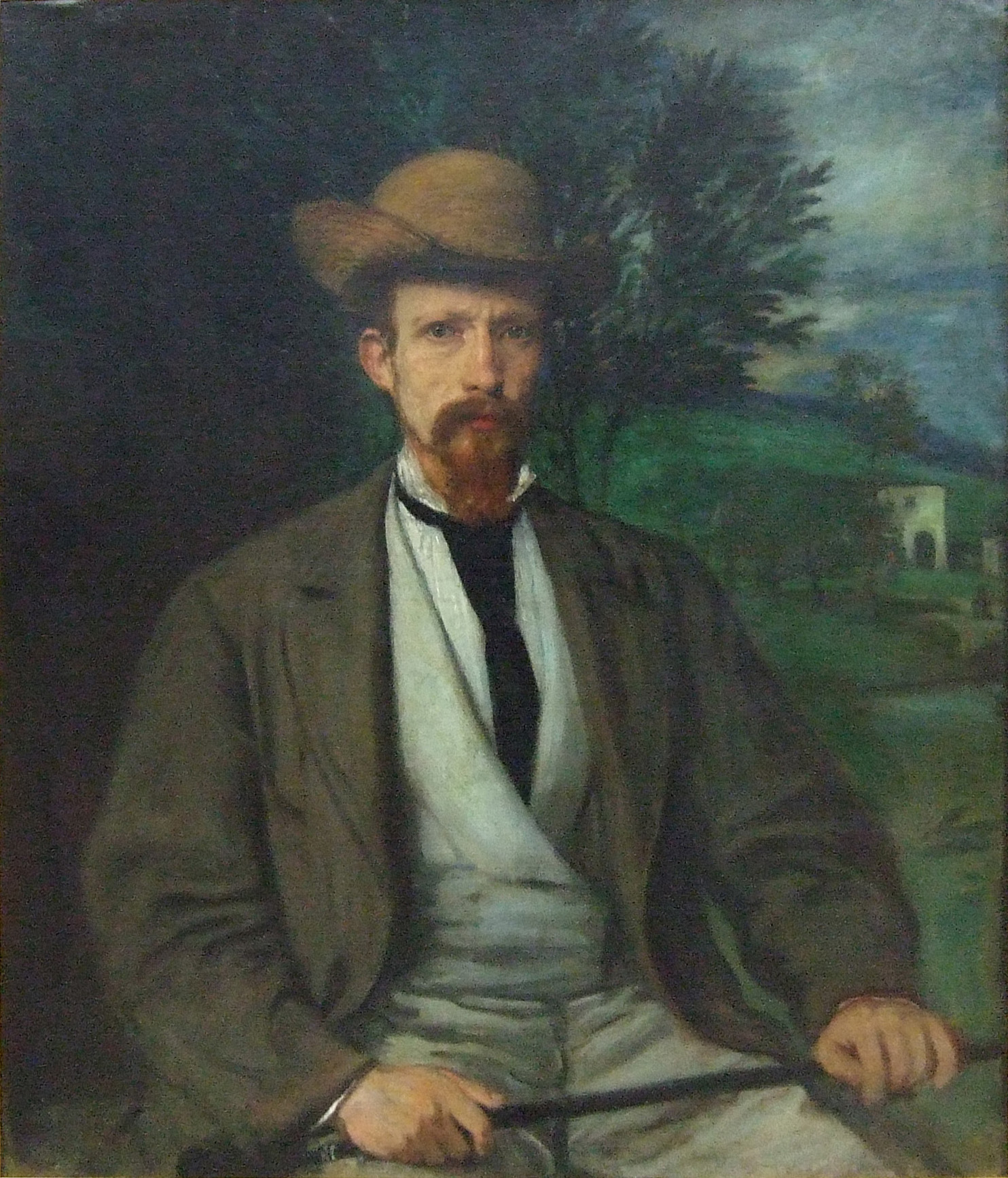
Self Portrait with Yellow Hat (German: Selbstbildnis mit gelbem Hut) (1874) Oil on canvas, Alte Nationalgalerie, Berlin

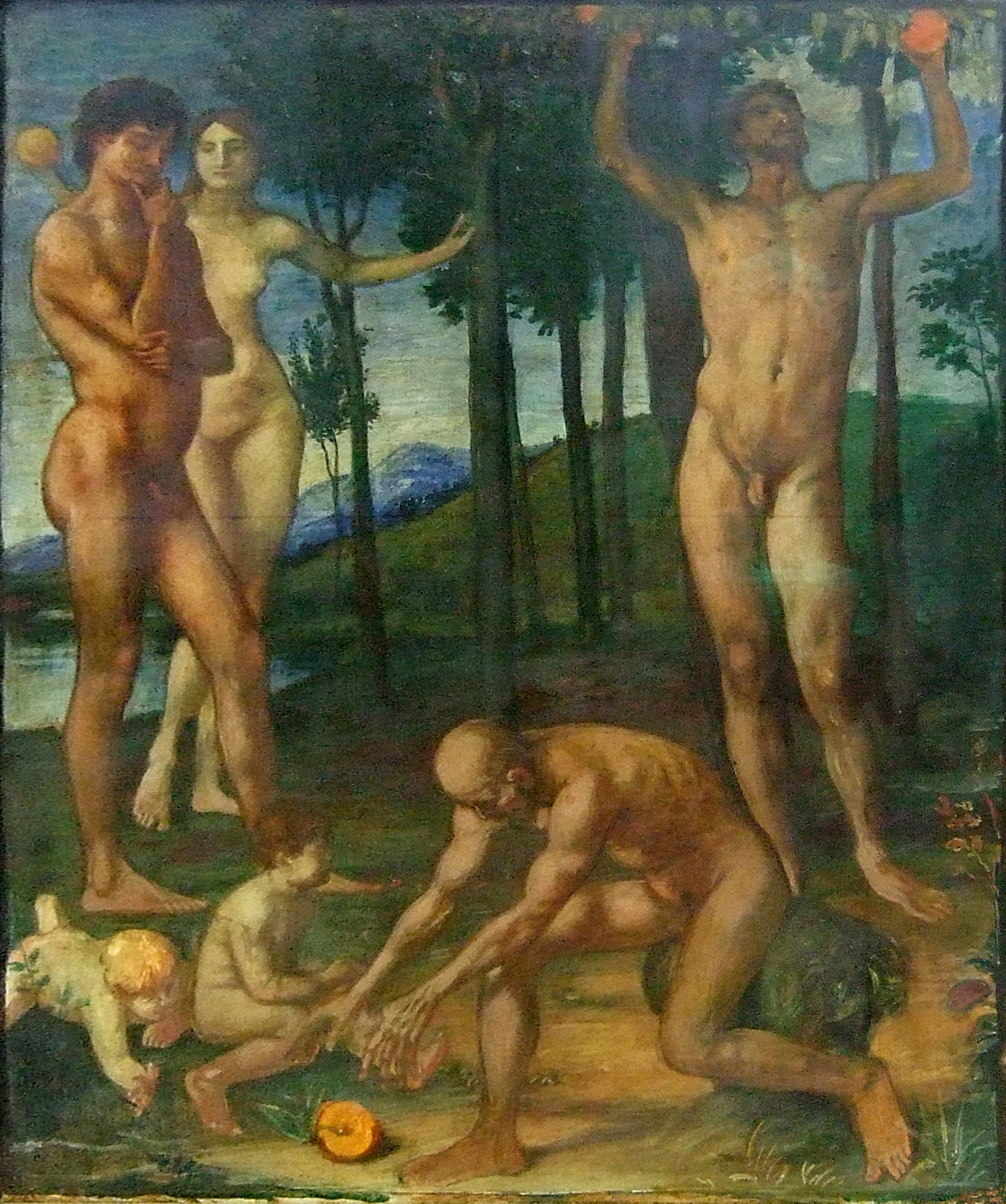
Die Lebensalter (1877/8). Alte Nationalglerie, Berlin.

Hans von Marées (24 December 1837 – 5 June 1887) was a German painter. Initially specialising in portraiture he later turned to mythological subjects. He spent the last years of his life in Italy.

== Life ==
Marées was born into a banking family at Elberfeld, part of Wuppertal since 1829, in the Kingdom of Prussia. In 1847 his family moved to Koblenz, where he was educated at the Gymnasium (grammar school). From 1853 to 1855 he studied at the Berlin Academy, and in 1854 he entered the studio of the painter and printmaker Carl Steffeck. He served in the military ifrom 1855 to 1857, after which he moved to Munich where he met Franz von Lenbach.

During his time in Munich he concentrated mainly on portraiture. In 1864 Count Adolf von Schack sent Marées and Lenbach to Italy to copy old masters. In Italy he became friendly with the art theorist Konrad Fiedler, who later became his patron, and the sculptor Adolf von Hildebrand.

In 1869, he visited France, the Netherlands and Spain with Fiedler. He served in military in the Franco-Prussian War (1870–71) and then lived in Berlin and Dresden for a while. In 1873, he decorated the library walls of the newly built German Marine Zoological Institute in Naples, Italy The murals consist of five scenes depicting figures in landscapes, set into a framework of friezes and pilasters designed by Hildebrand. They have no specific symbolic or mythological scheme, being intended simply to express, in Marées' own words, "the joys of sea and beach life". The next year, he moved to Florence, where he became acquainted with Adolf von Hildebrand, Anselm Feuerbach and Arnold Böcklin, leading members of the group of idealist, intellectual artists known as the "German Romans".

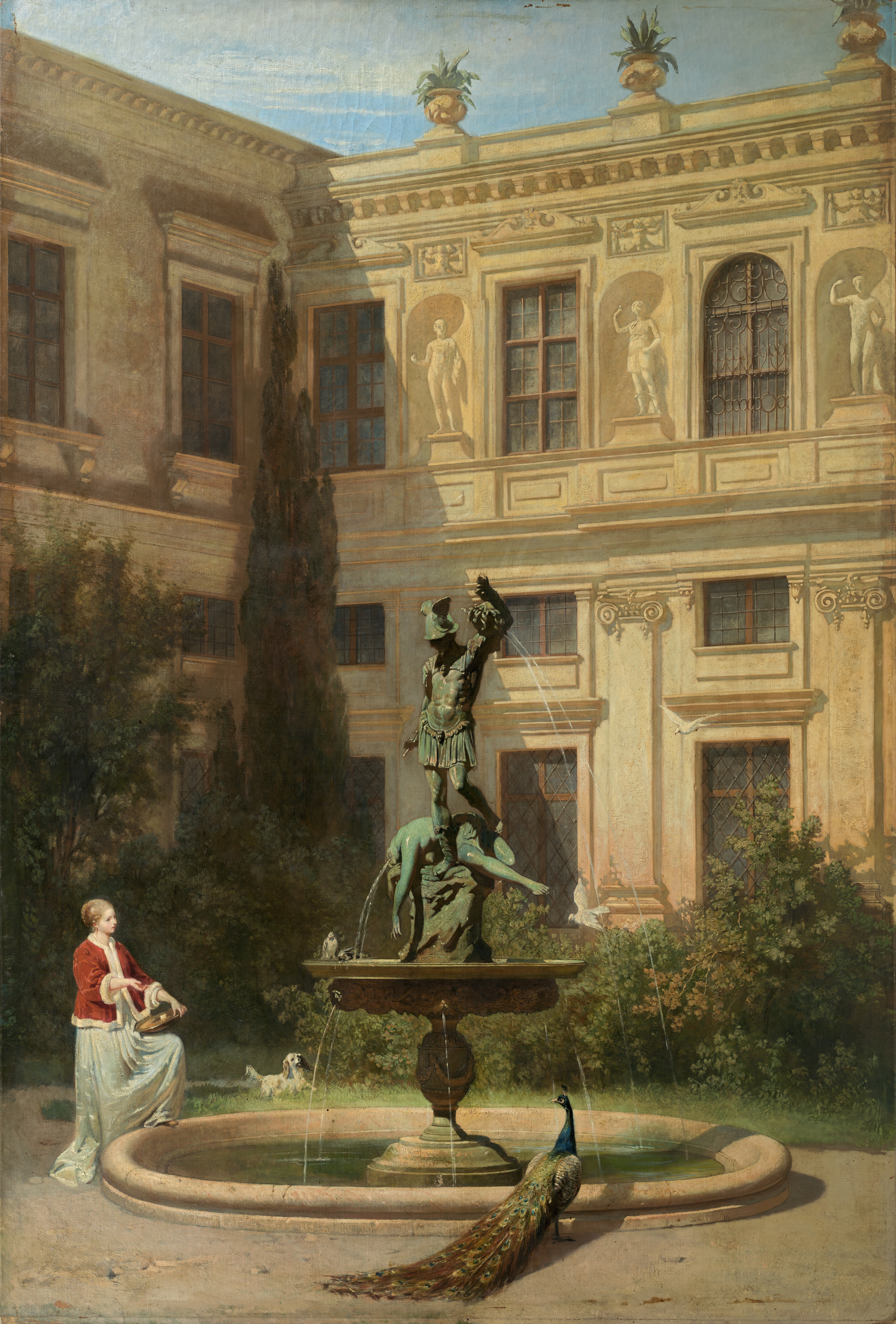
Courtyard with the Grotto in the Munich Royal Residence

He turned increasingly to mythological subjects and developed a complex and individual technique, overpainting tempera with layers of oil and creating a depth of colour quite unlike the muted tones used by his fellow classicist, Feuerbach. Fritz Novotny wrote that in Marées' brand of classicism "a completely new role is assigned to colour", and that, after Ingres, he was "the second great classicist in the nineteenth century who was also a great artist".

In the 1880s Marées painted four monumental triptychs: The Judgment of Paris, The Hesperides, Three Saints on Horseback and The Wooing. During this time he also produced smaller mythological paintings and some portraits. He spent these last years of his life in Rome, supported by Fiedler. He died there in 1887, at the age of 49, and was buried in the Protestant Cemetery.

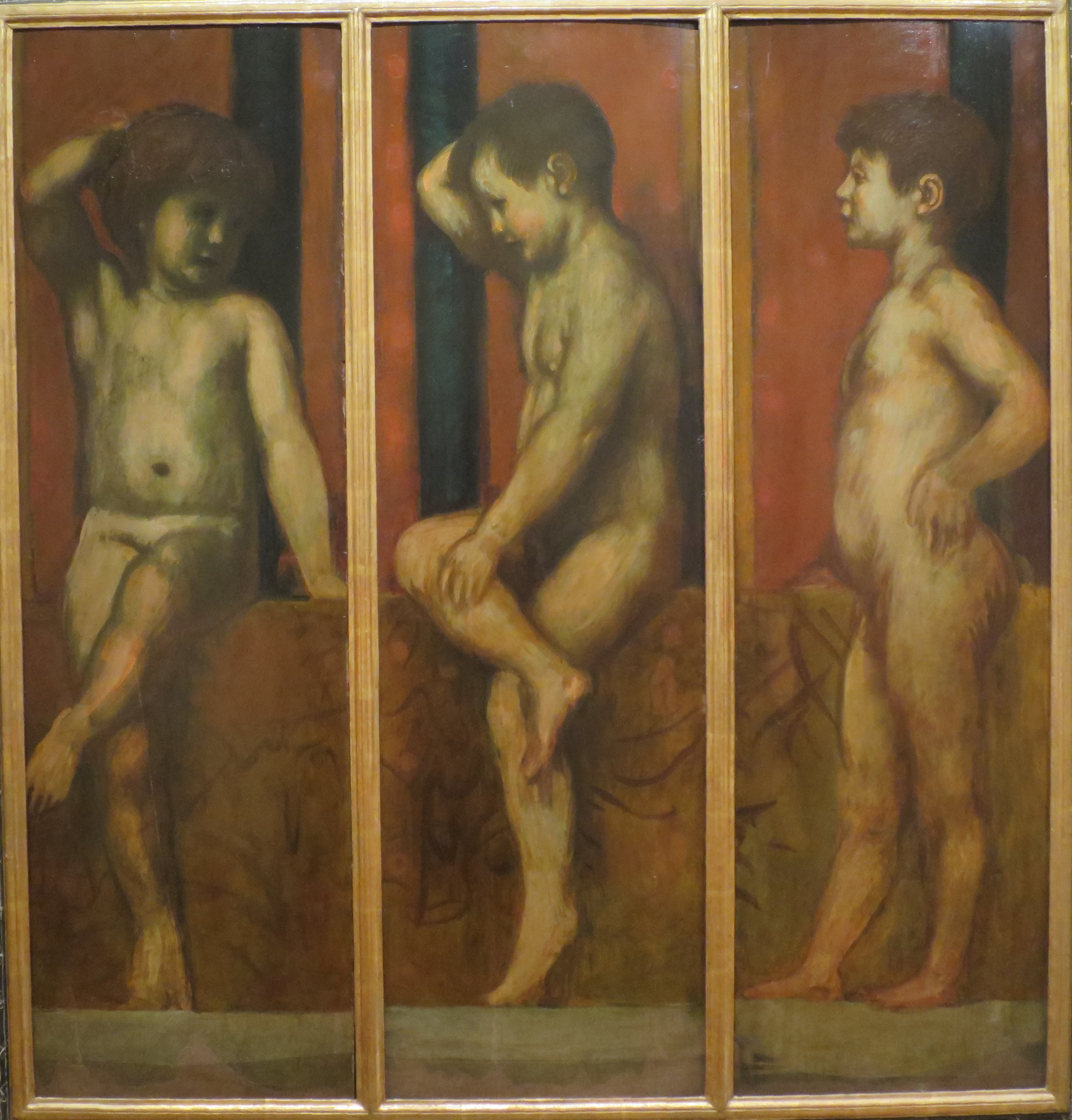
The Judgement of Paris fragments

In 1935 the painting Die Labung had been stolen by the Nazi regime. In 1980 it came into the possession of the Museum Wiesbaden. In order to fulfill the museum's project of identifying Nazi plunder and to return it to the legitimate heirs – the museum kept showing only the backside of the work, until they collected enough money through donations to buy it at the end of the same year.

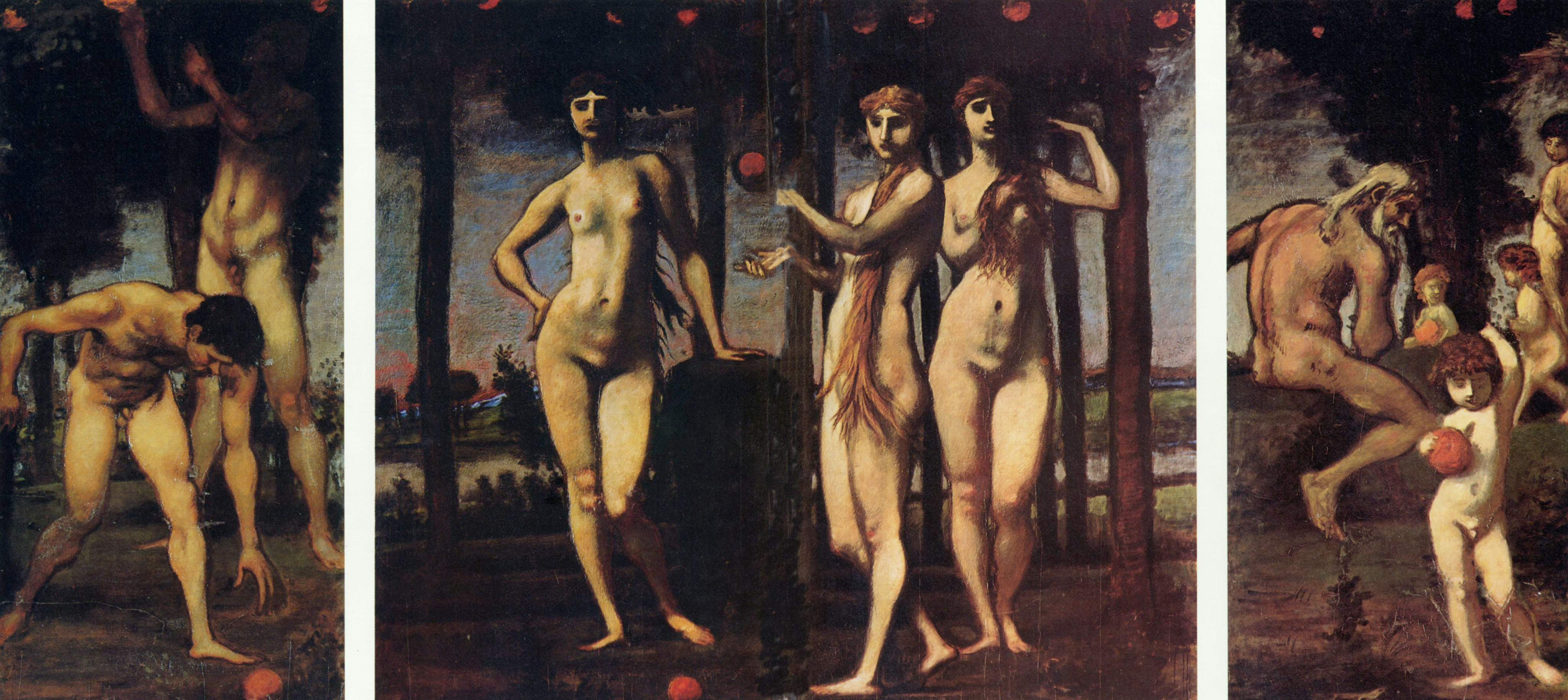
Hesperiden, Triptychon

== Sources ==
- German Masters of the Nineteenth Century: Paintings and Drawings from the Federal Republic of Germany. Catalogue of an exhibition held at the Metropolitan Museum of Art, New York, 1981. Free download available.
- Novotny, Fritz (1978) [1960]. Painting and Sculpture in Europe. The Pelican History of Art. Harmondsworth: Penguin Books. ISBN 014056120X.
