= Bismarck monument (Bremen) =

- Bismarck-Denkmal
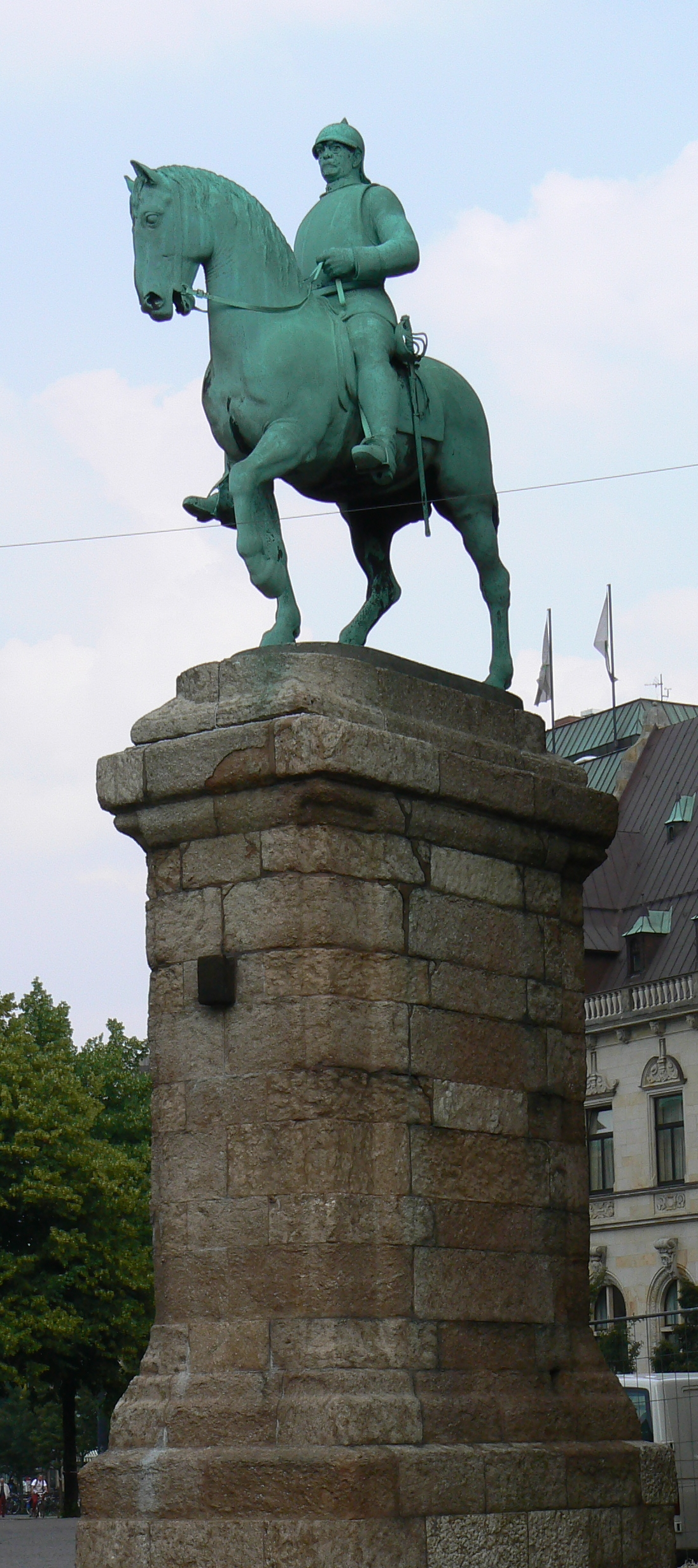
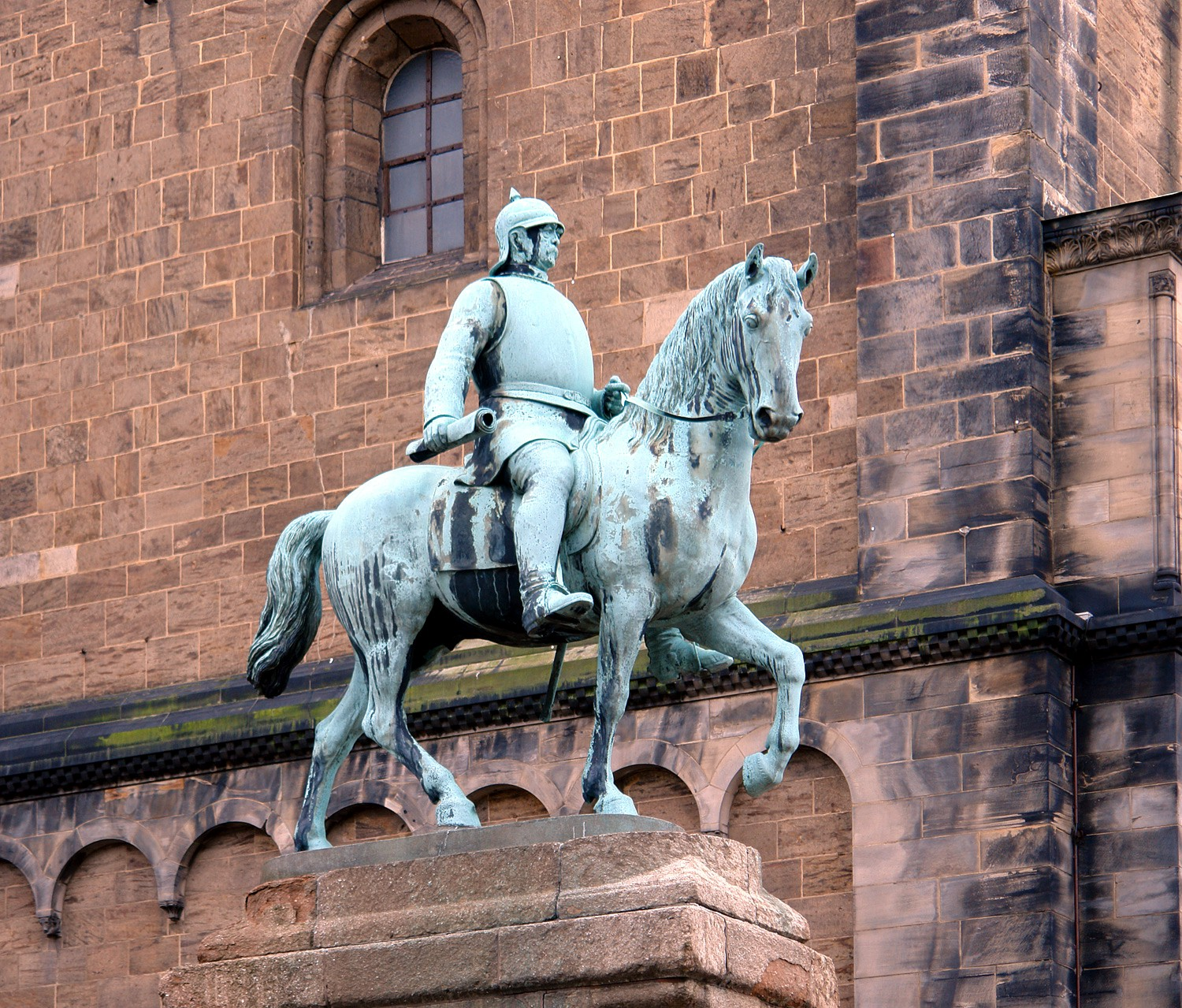
- View of the monument from the southwest
- Interactive map of Bismarck monument
- Location: Bremen, Germany
- Coordinates: 53°4′33″N 8°48′31″E
- Designer: Architect: Carl Sattler; Sculptor: Adolf von Hildebrand
- Material: Unterberg quasi-marble
- Opening date: 9 July 1910
- Dedicated to: Otto von Bismarck

The Bismarck monument outside the cathedral in Bremen is a bronze figure of the former Chancellor, riding a horse. It was created in 1910, twelve years after Bismarck's death. The commission was entrusted to Adolf von Hildebrand in 1904. Since 1973 the monument has enjoyed protected status.

== Bismarck and Bremen ==
Otto von Bismarck (1815-1898), the Prussian politician and, from 1871 till 1890, the German Chancellor (leader of the government), was celebrated as the "iron chancellor", above all because of the central part he played in creating the German state. His reputation survived his dismissal in 1890 by the new emperor, William II. His relationship with Bremen's political establishment was not always a smooth one. This reflected divergent interests over important issues involving colonial policy and trade and tariff issues. Nevertheless, in Bremen, just as in other parts of the new country that were not part of Prussia, Bismarck was revered as a symbol of national unity. Hundreds of memorials exist across Germany, some of them erected while their subject was still alive, but most of them postdating Bismarck's death on 30 July 1898.

== History ==
Just three week's after Bismarck's death a committee met at the instigation of the city's mayor, Alfred Pauli and the leading petroleum importer and patron of the arts, Franz Schütte, in order to solicit donations for a memorial:

"Our city must have a memorial to Prince Bismarck, as a testimony to the undying reverence of Bremen for the first counsellor of the first German emperor, as a lasting memorial to the unification of our fatherland, and as a proclamation of our unshakable loyalty to the emperor and the state. In order to create a worthy memorial for Prince Bismarrck in Bremen, we call upon our fellow citizens to help us [with their monetary contributions]."

Two people headed up the subsequent planning phase. The businessman Franz Ernst SchütteFranz Schütte took on personally the role of lead sponsor and principal collector of donations. When 207,000 Marks that had been collected were lost because of a bank collapse it was Schütte, supported by senators and fellow merchants, who managed within 48 hours to amass a sum equivalent to the monies lost. Meanwhile, decisive input on the artistic parameters came from the mayor's son, Gustav Pauli, a noted art historian and the director of the city's Kunsthalle (art gallery). Gustav Pauli has been identified as a mentor of the artistic reform movement that was a feature of Bremen at the start of the twentieth century. In respect of the proposed Bismarck memorial he found himself having to fend off opposition from conservative forces represented, as their leading spokesman, by Arthur Fitger. These same elements were already established critics of his acquisitions policy for the city's art gallery. The first point of contention was the monument's location. A position on the city ramparts was rejected because it might be interpreted as "petty imitation" of the Hamburg Bismarck monument which had been signed off in 1901 (but would be completed only in 1906). There were already plans to place a monument to Helmuth von Moltke at the Church of Our Lady. That left the open area by the cathedral, which was the location suggested by Adolf von Hildebrand, the well regarded sculptor who had already been co-opted as an expert advisor to the memorial committee. In 1904 he proposed an equestrian statue outside the cathedral at its northwest corner, and shortly afterwards was himself commissioned to design it. Four years later the statue was ready, and on 9 July 1910 it was unveiled, placed on a six meter high plinth constructed according to a design by the architect Carl Sattler (who by this time had become the sculptor's son-in-law).

The facing on the plinth is made from Unterberg "marble". The actual bronze casting was carried out by the Berlin firm, Gladenbeck & Son.

In 1942 the monument was walled up on the northside of the cathedral in order to protect it from World War II damage. It remained out of sight till 1952 when, despite opposition from the locally dominant Social Democratic Party, it went back on display on the initiative of the city's popular (Social Democratic) mayor, Wilhelm Kaisen.

== Significance ==
Of the many Bismarck monuments in Germany, the Bremen one is the only one taking the form of an equestrian statue. The chancellor sits on a horse at the top of a six meter tall stone plinth wearing a helmet and a slightly stylised version of the uniform of the Cuirassier regiment. The elevated position reflects the subject's status, and the various elements of the form are powerfully and compactly modelled. The head of the horse is half turned towards the cathedral square, adding a welcome hint of liveliness. The chancellor holds a scroll in his right hand which has been interpreted as a constitutional document.

The overall architecture of the monument and its siting were clearly based on Andrea del Verrocchio's 1493 equestrian monument to Bartolomeo Colleoni, outside the church of San Zanipolo in Venice. Descriptions commend its well judged positioning. Without detracting from the adjacent northwestern tower of the cathedral, the monument, with its vertically imposing plinth, it marks a fitting focal point where the cathedral square and the market place abut. Depending on the angle from which it is viewed, the monument offers a diverse range of perspectives and architectural references.
