= New Town Hall (Bremen) =

Building in Germany

Coordinates: 53°4′33.5″N 8°48′29.7″E

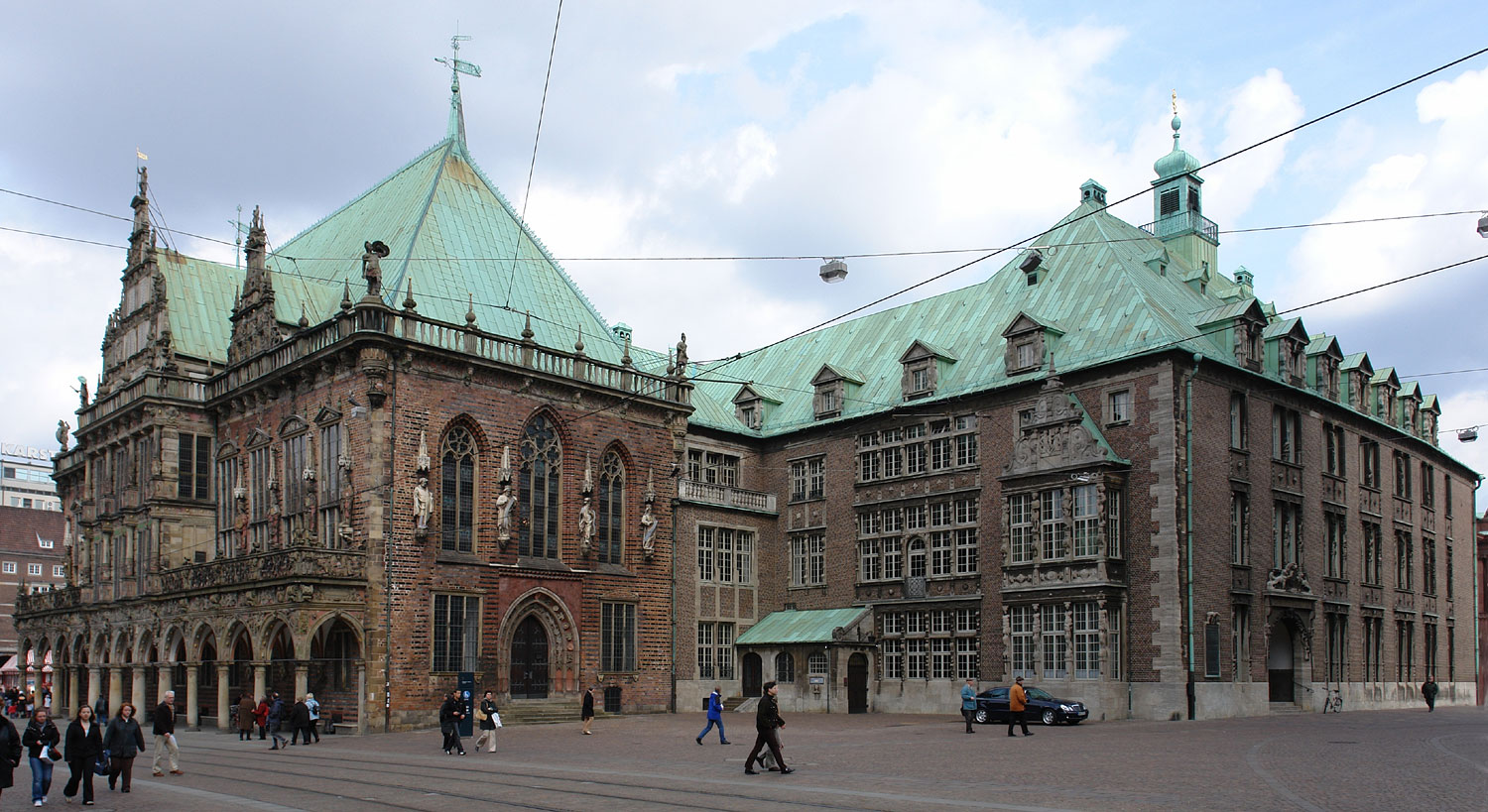
The Old and New Town Halls

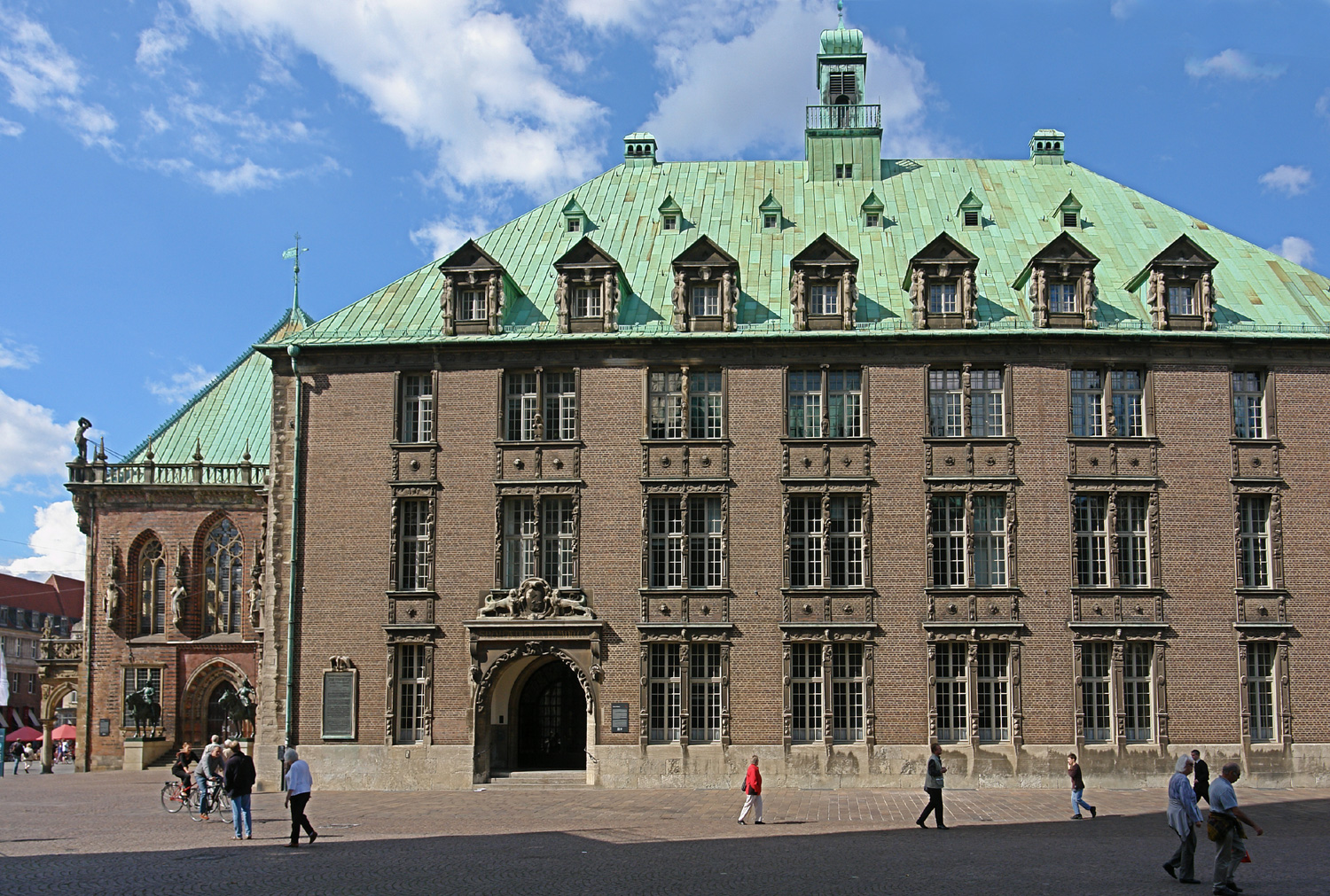
Eastern façade with portal

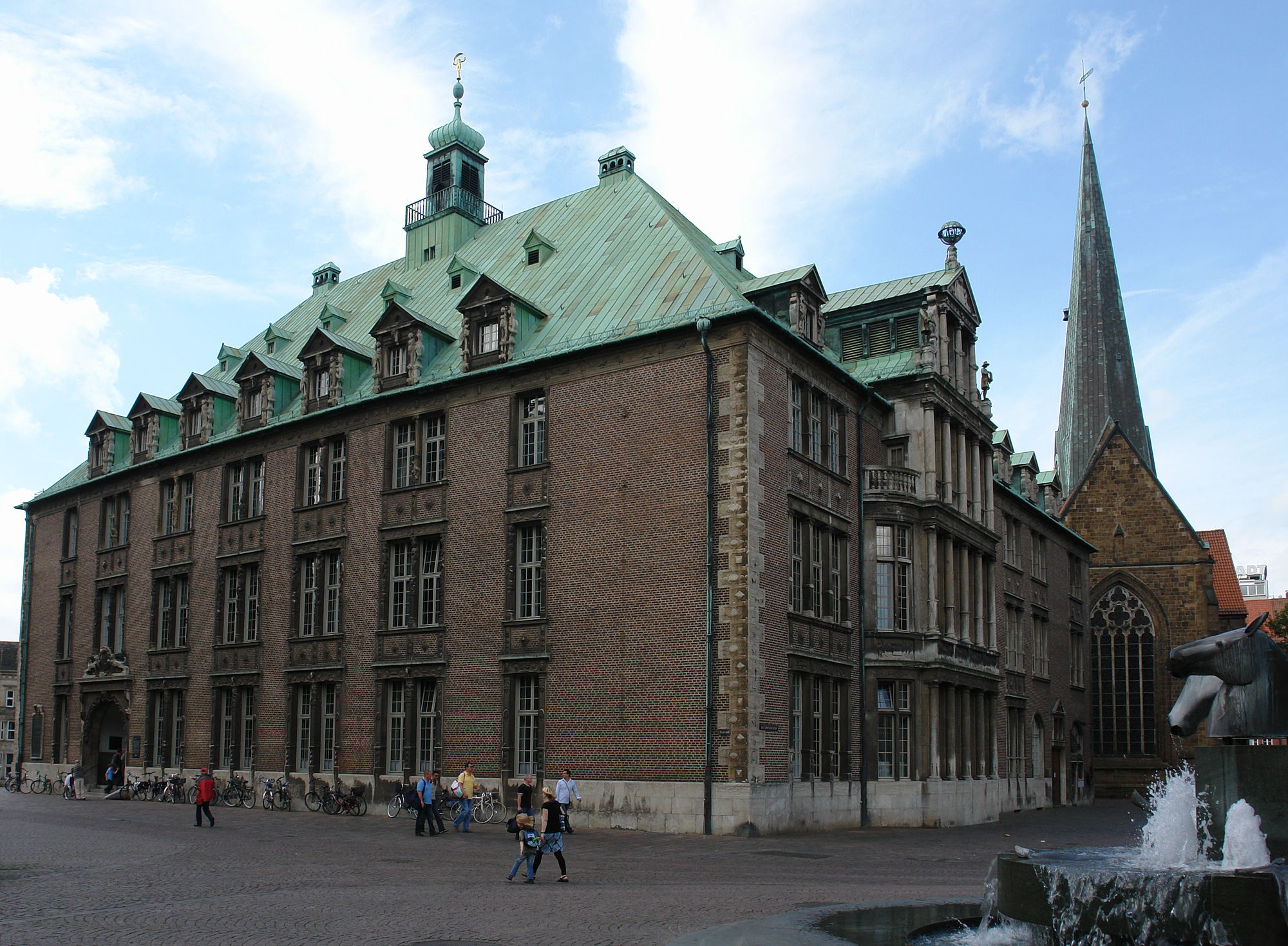
Façade facing the cathedral

The New Town Hall (German: Neues Rathaus) has stood on the Domshof in the centre of Bremen, Germany since 1913. Located behind the Unser-Lieben-Frauen-Kirchhof cemetery, it is adjacent to the older section of the Town Hall with which it forms a harmonious ensemble. Among its sumptuous rooms decorated with local artefacts, the New Town Hall houses the Senate Chamber used by the Senate for its regular meetings and the Great Hall, a venue for official receptions. In 2004, Bremen Town Hall was listed as a UNESCO World Heritage Site, together with the Roland of Bremen, because of its outstanding architecture and testimony to the development of civic autonomy during the Holy Roman Empire.

== History ==
=== Palatium, Stadthaus and planning of the new building ===
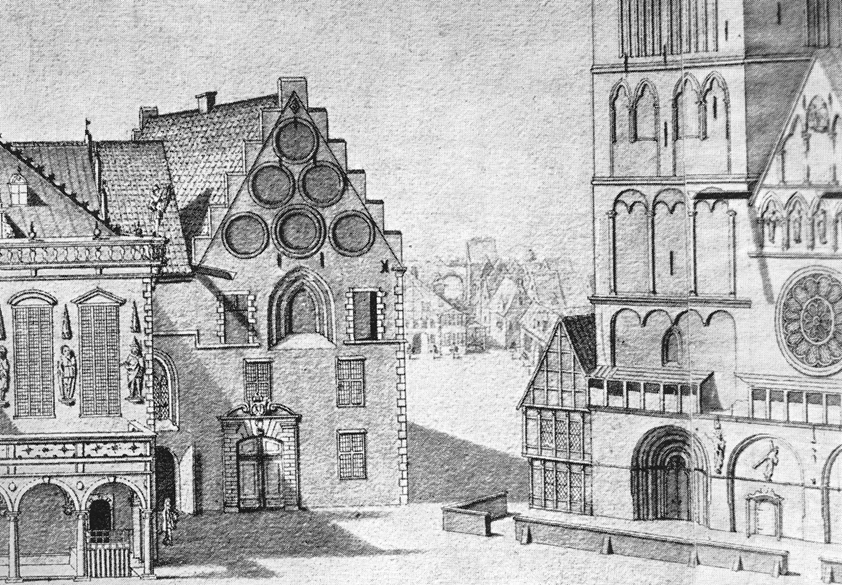
Palatium: southern gable around 1695

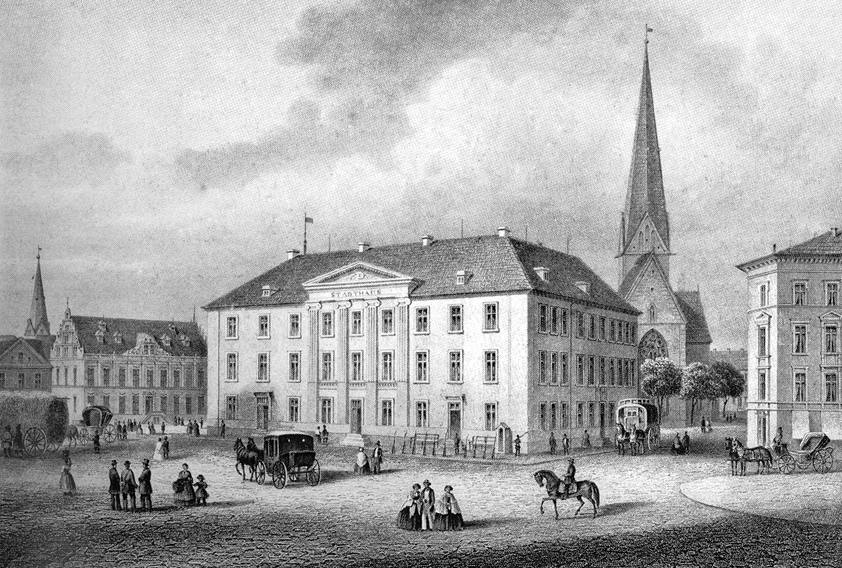
Stadthaus around 1850

Between 1819 and 1908, the building known as the Stadthaus supplemented the Town Hall in fulfilling the administrative requirements of the city. It had been built on the site of the Palatium, the archbishop's residence. The Stadthaus was a fairly simple building in the Neo-classical style. It consisted of offices and storage rooms for the municipal administration. In 1818, Bremen had 37,029 inhabitants but by 1904, the population had grown to 214,953.

In 1891, Franz Schütte, the so-called "petroleum king" of Bremen, proposed replacing the Stadthaus with a more representative building. He presented plans prepared by cathedral architect Max Salzmann but as no funds were available, there was no follow-up. In 1899, Schütte bought a large plot of land from the senate for 2.5 million marks. He promised to develop the property on condition the city contributed its own resources towards building the new municipal administration. The proposals by Schütte and his consortium were initially turned down. But after heated debate in the parliamentary Bürgerschaft of Bremen, they were finally accepted.

An open architectural competition for a new building as an extension to the existing Town Hall was launched in 1903/04. Despite the receipt of 105 proposals, none was selected. Another limited architectural competition in 1907/08 resulted in the selection of a proposal from the Munich architect Gabriel von Seidl. In 1909, the existing Stadthaus —– known as the "grey box" —- was pulled down, together with the remainder of the palatium dating from 1580. In 1908, the city police had moved into the new police station located on the Am Wall street.

=== The new building ===
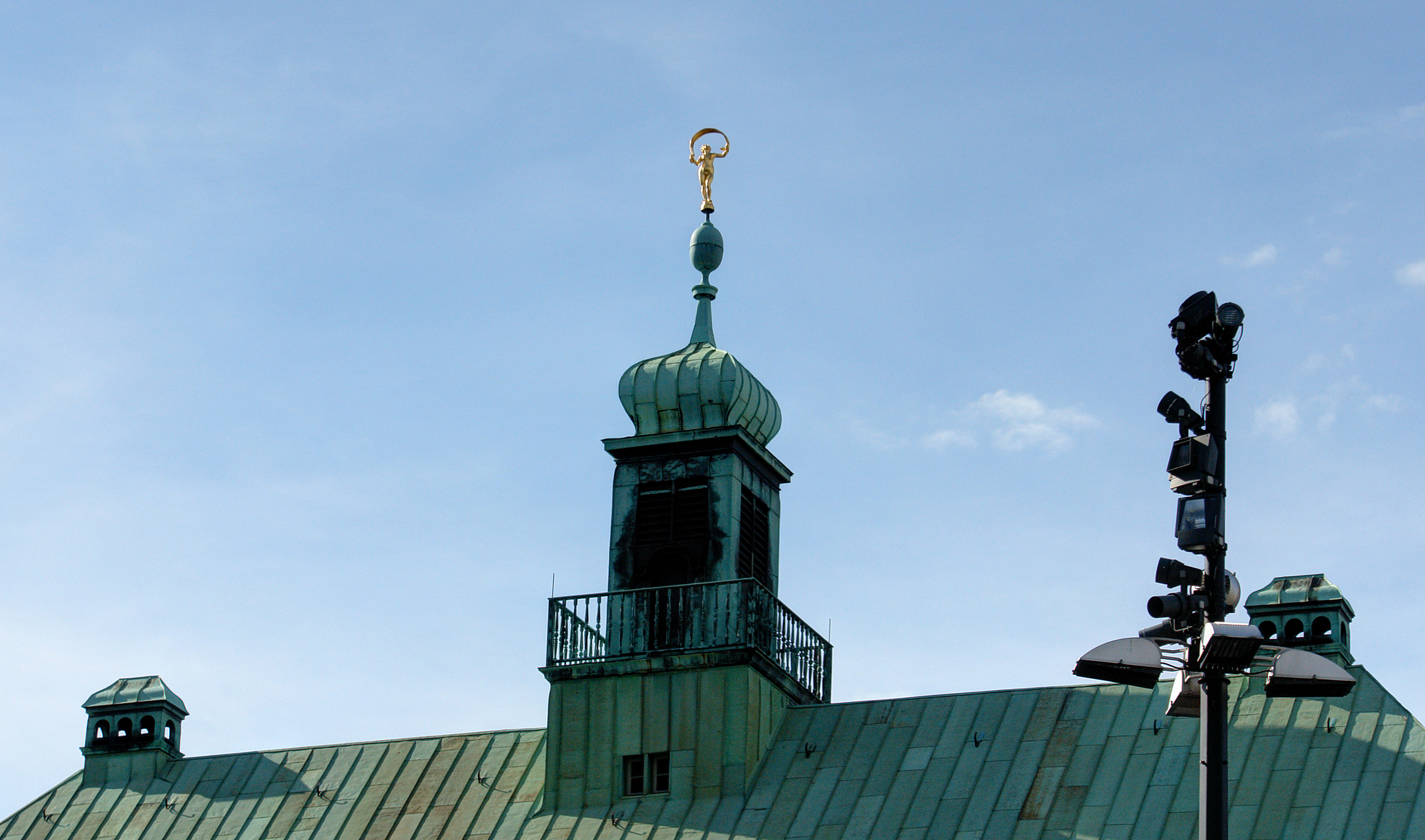
Eastern roof with the Fortuna sculpture

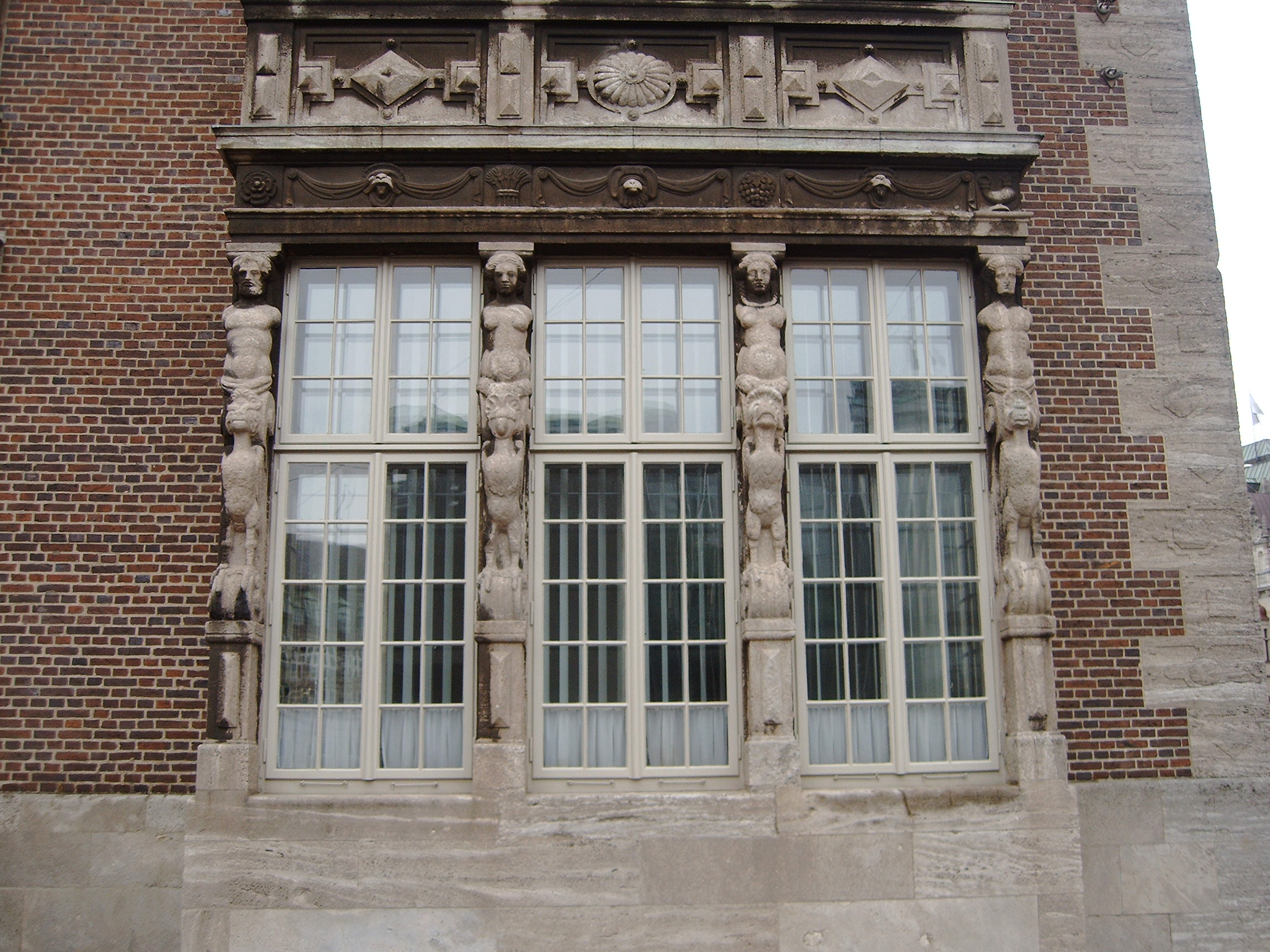
Southern side, mayor's oriel

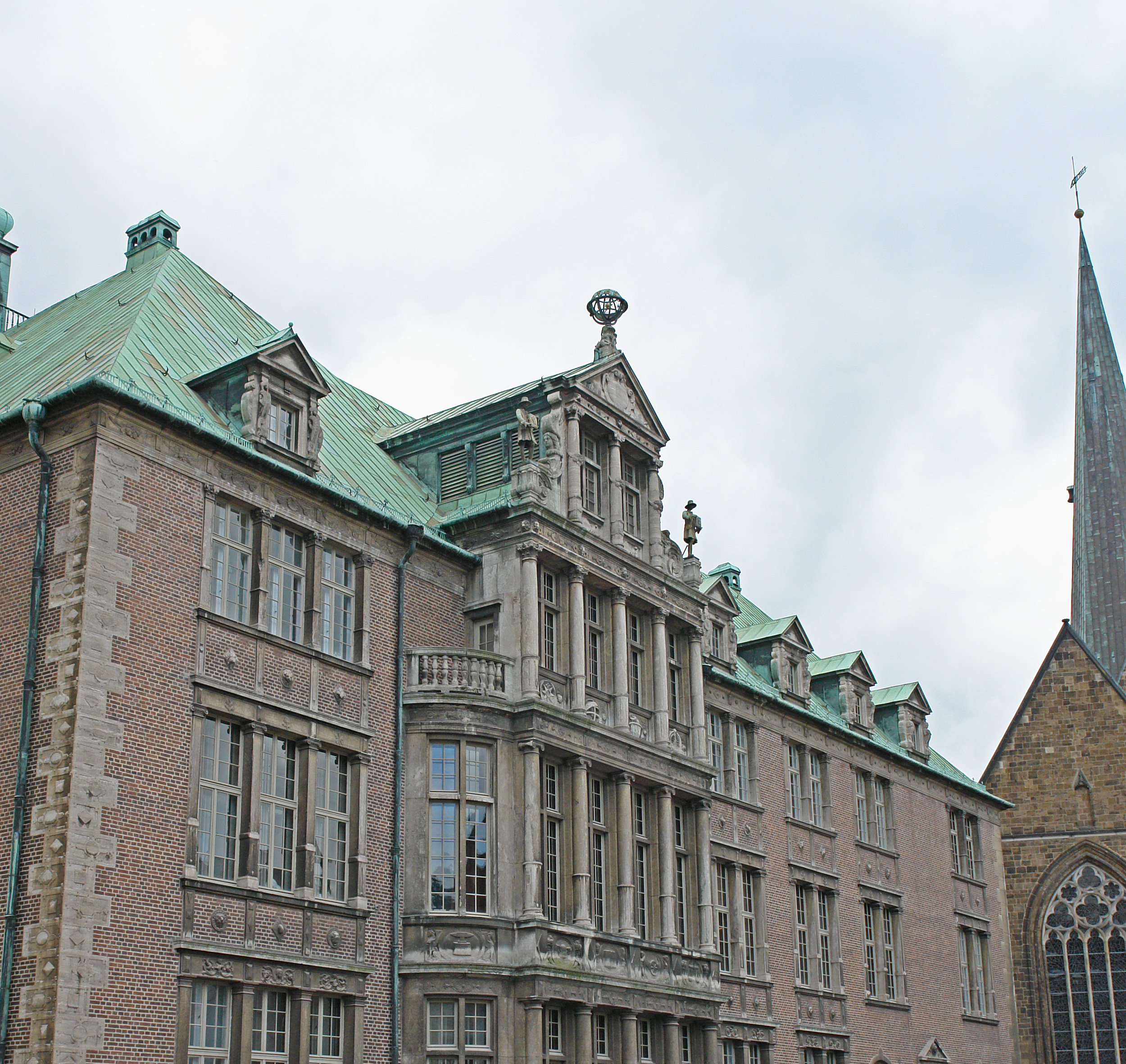
Northern façade with its armillary sphere

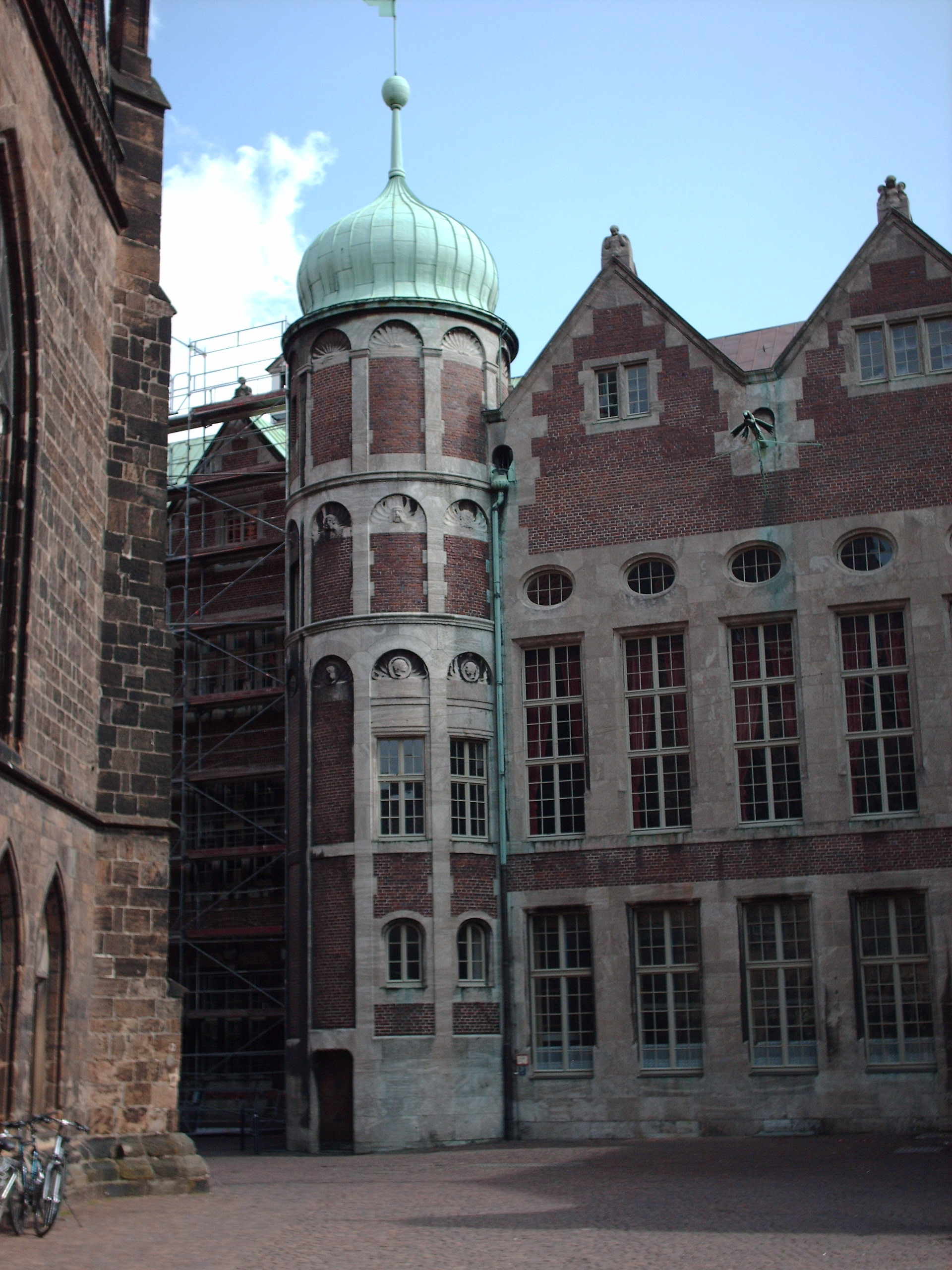
Western façade facing the Church of Our Lady

The new Town Hall, three times larger than the old building, was built from 1909 to 1913, mostly by local construction companies. The result was a fine three-storey Neo-Renaissance building with a clinker-brick façade and a hipped, copper-plated roof. The finish consisted of clinker bricks from Oldenburg and Muschelkalk limestone from Bavaria while Obernkirchen sandstone was used for the interior. Despite the practices of the times, it was decided there should be no tower. Senator Friedrich Nebelthau summed it up in 1913: "Wie schmiegt es sich dem alten Rathaus an, ohne in Nachahmung zu verfallen" (How it nestles against the old Town Hall without lapsing into imitation.)

The building was inaugurated with speech delivered by Mayor Carl Barkhausen on 16 January 1913. From the beginning, the building was used as the Senate Chancellery, bearing the "Neues Rathaus" (New Town Hall). All were delighted when it was discovered that the actual construction cost 100,000 Marks less than the expected 1,518,000 Marks.

=== Façades ===
The facades were richly decorated:

- The main façade on the eastern side overlooking the cathedral consists of five two-sectioned windows with a narrow window band on either side. The hipped roof is structured with seven dormers. In the middle of the roof, there is a small ridge turret crowned by a Fortuna sculpted in gilt bronze and designed by Georg Roemer.
- The southern façade overlooking the Grasmarkt and Marktplatz contains the two-storey oriel window of mayor's room. To the left, the three-storey glass façade with five bays contains a proclamation window which it was customary to include in old town halls but was more symbolic than practical.
- The northern façade facing the Domshof is marked by the four-storey senate oriel with four bays. In accordance with Hanseatic practice, a Neoclassical triangular gable bears a globe in the form of an armillary sphere, designed by Georg Roemer. The symbols of craftmanship, trade, science and justice are displayed below the windows of the Senate Chamber. Reminiscent of Bremen's harbour, the maritime symbols and tools were sculpted by Heinrich Erlewein. The guardian angels on the third oriel ledge and the two upright city councillors were sculpted by Roemer.
- The western façade opposite the cemetery is less ostentatious. It has five gables and a round tower with a spherical copper-plated spire. Inside, the Great Hall to the right encompasses two storeys while the Tapestry Room and the Fireplace Room are in the three-storey section on the left. Above the symmetrically designed Main Portal, the Bremen coat of arms bears the inscription S•P•Q•B for Senatus populusque Bremensis (Senate and People of Bremen), as well as the inscription ÆDIFIC A°D° MDCCCCX (built in 1910).

=== Decoration ===
The façade decorations were designed by Gabriel von Seidl. Julius Seidler and Fidelis Enderle from Bavaria executed the work on the main and Grasmarkt façades while, on the insistence of the Senate, those on the other walls were created by the Bremen artist Heinrich Erlewein. Gabriel von Seidl used biblical subjects for the five double windows on the cathedral side, from left to right: Adam and Eve's Fall from Grace, Susanna in the Bath, Abraham with Sarah and Hagar, David fighting Goliath, King Ahab with Jezebel and Naboth.

The smaller windows on the left and right were decorated with subjects from the New Testament. The mayor's window on the left is decorated with mythological birds representing the qualities of Jesus Christ: the owl for wisdom, the eagle for strength, the pelican for love, and the phoenix for rebirth. The Evangelists' Window on the right carries the attributes of the four evangelists, the angel for Matthew, the lion for Mark, the bull for Luke, and the eagle for John. The façades are also decorated with various figures and ornaments such as four children playing with domestic animals, the staff of Mercury, the trident of Neptune for trade and shipping, two playing angels on the Domshof architrave, squirrels nibbling at the national property, a lion killing a basilisk, several lions with rings in their mouths, one with the key from the Bremen coat of arms, several other animals, a siren tempting sailors and a man with a shield.

=== Interior ===
At the end of the Upper Lobby, the Senate Chamber (Senatssaal) is used for the sessions of the Senate of Bremen. The carpets were designed by the then young artist and writer Rudolf Alexander Schröder in his capacity as interior decorator. In 2012, Schröder's carpet was replaced by an exact replica, 160 m^{2} (1,700 sq ft) in size. Produced in Nepal, the replacement cost €110,000.

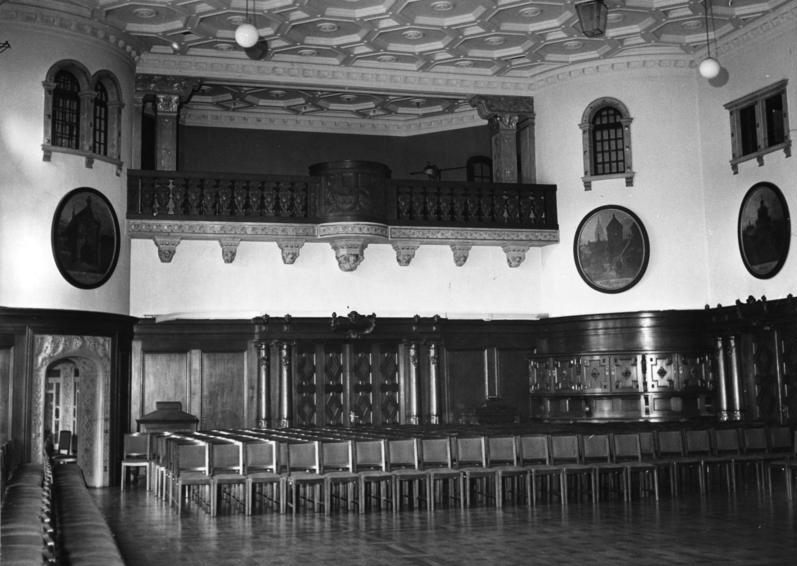
Great Hall, 1955

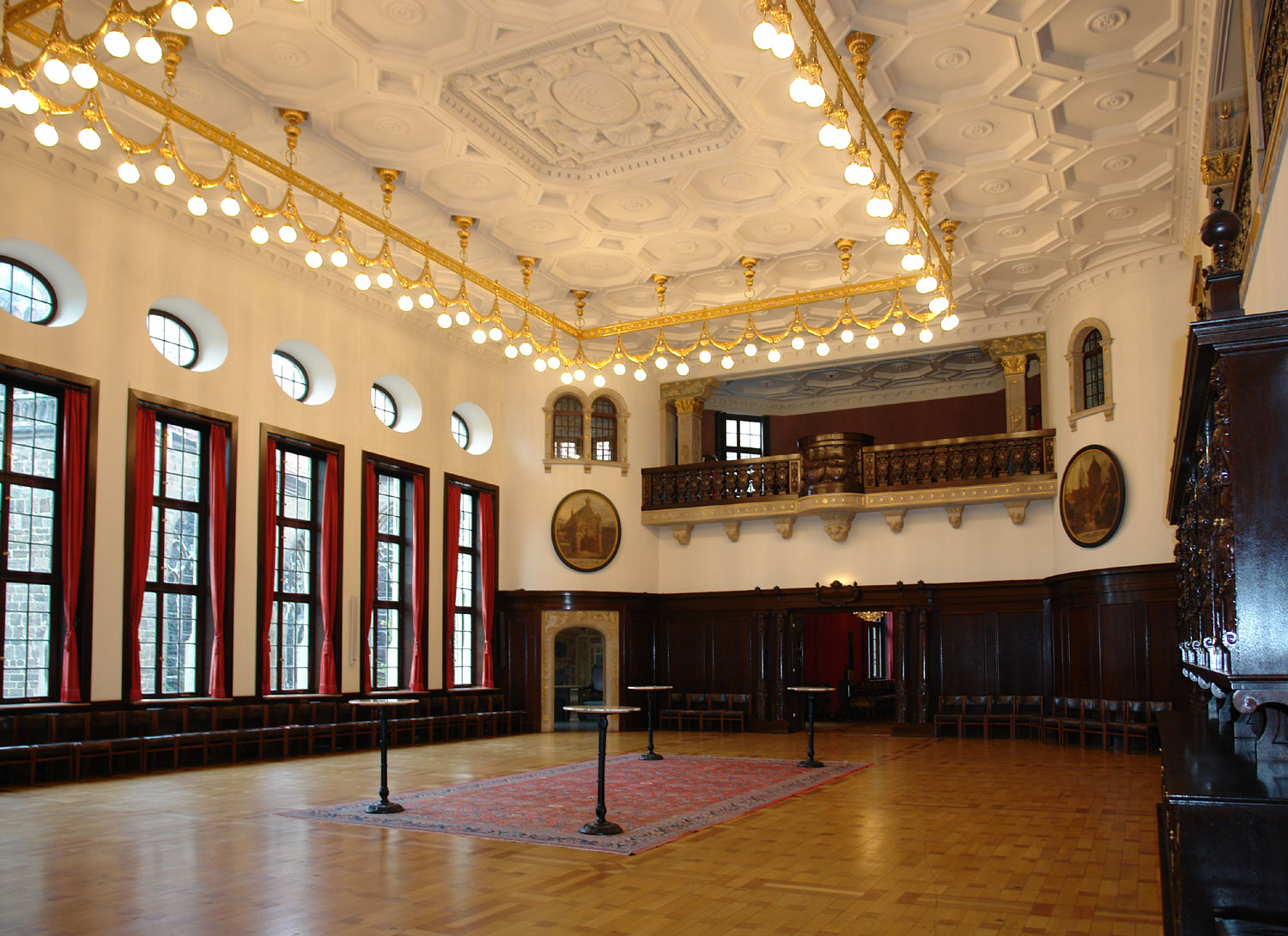
Great Hall, 2007

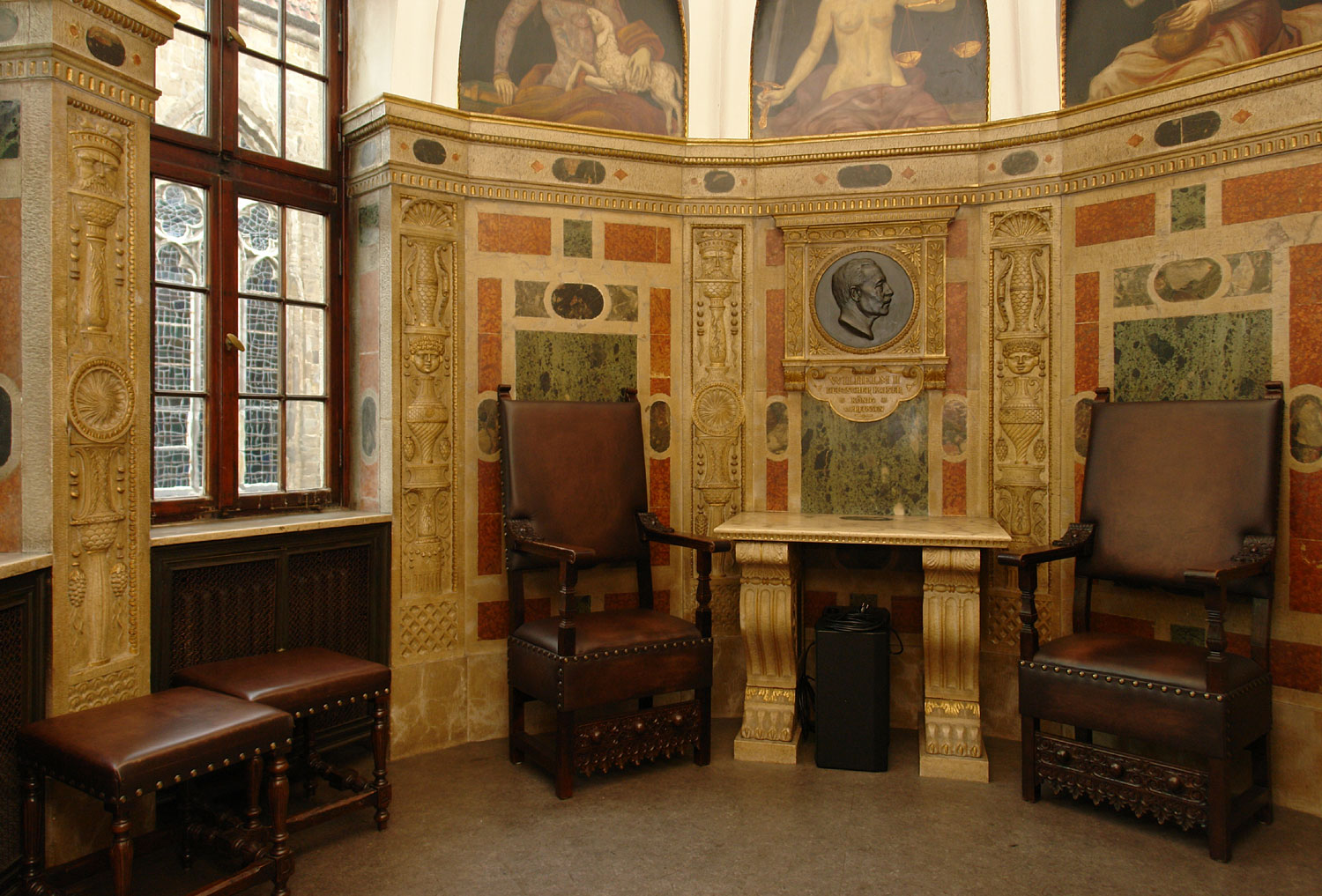
Tower Room adjacent to the Great Hall

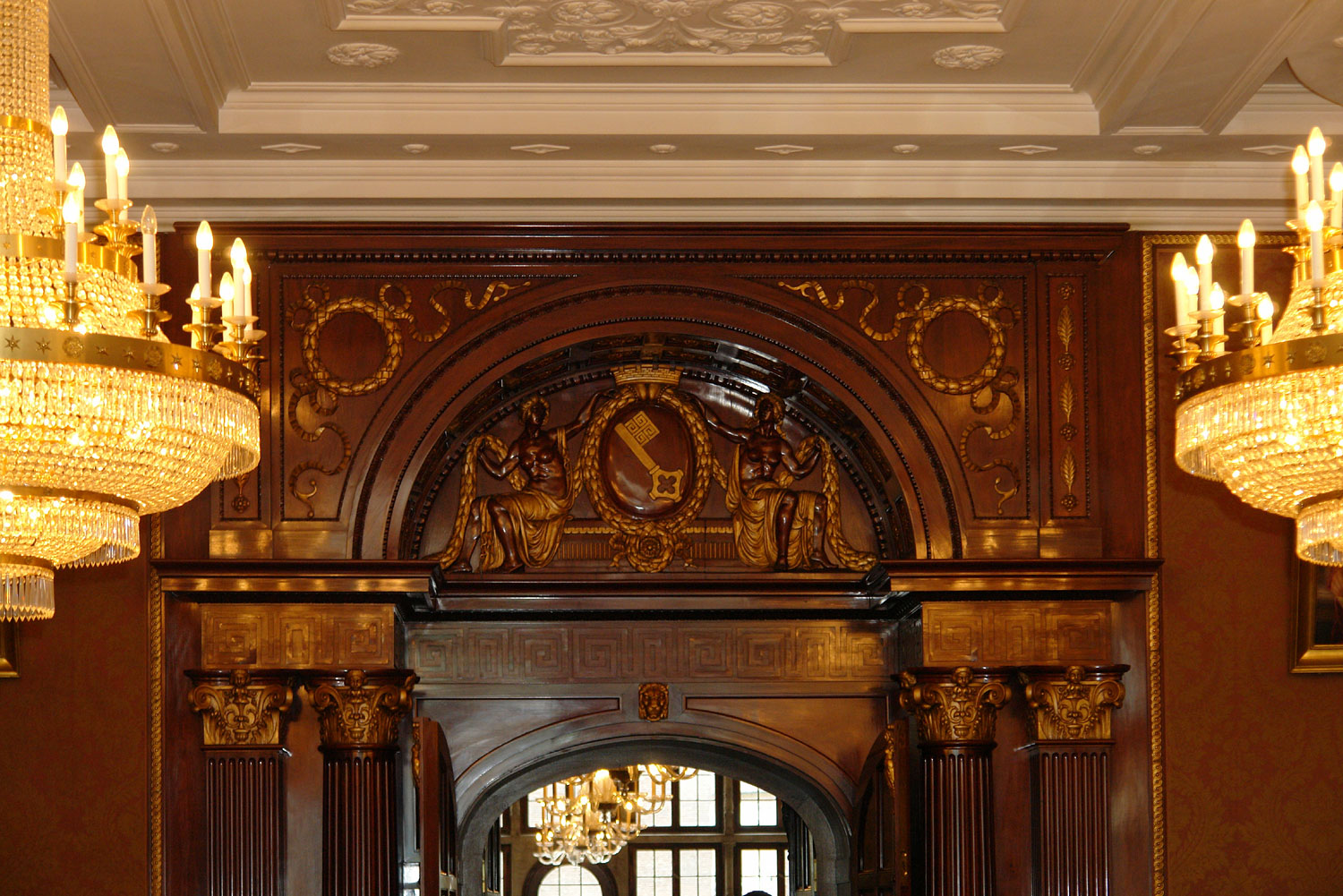
Door inside Senate Chamber

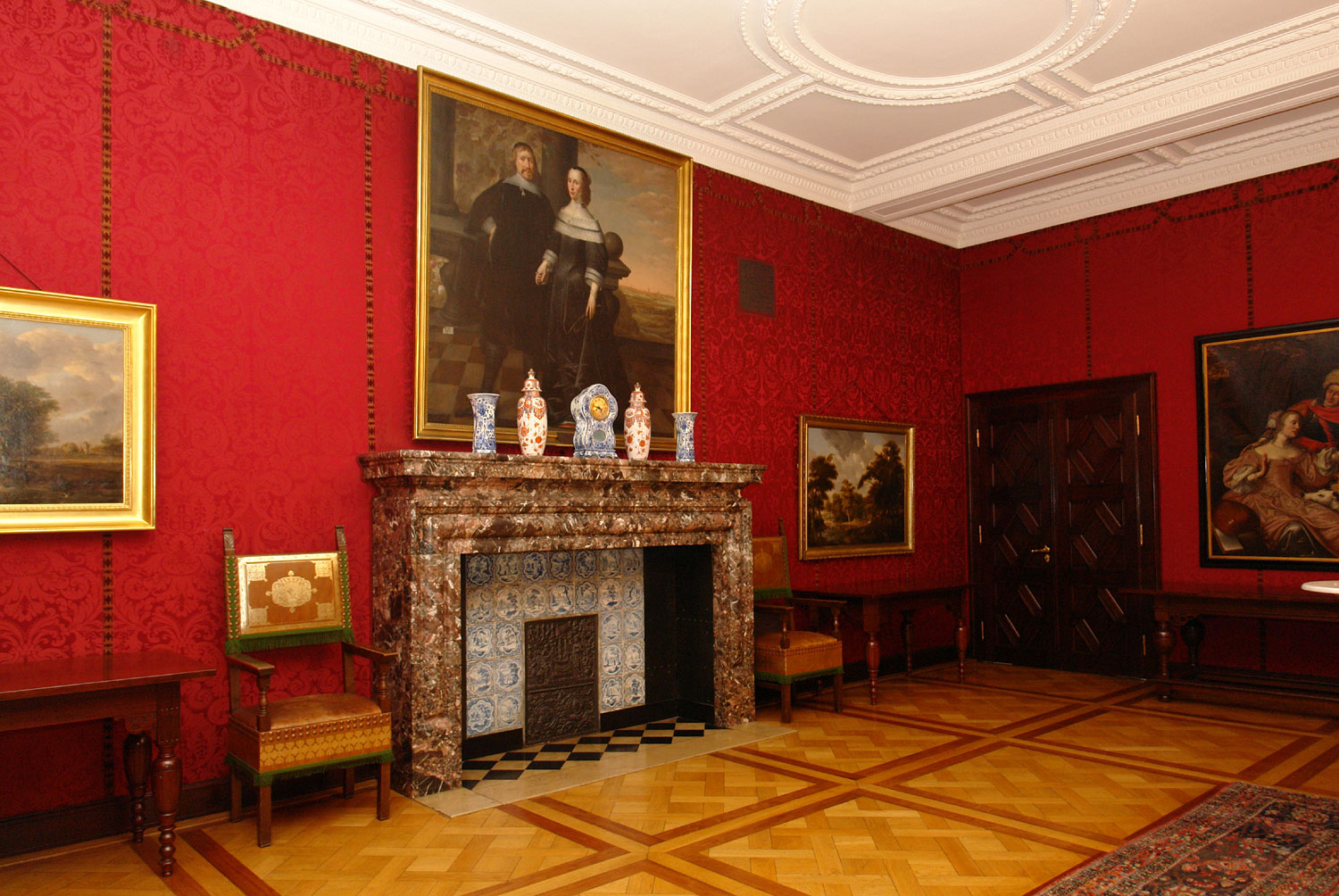
Fireplace Room

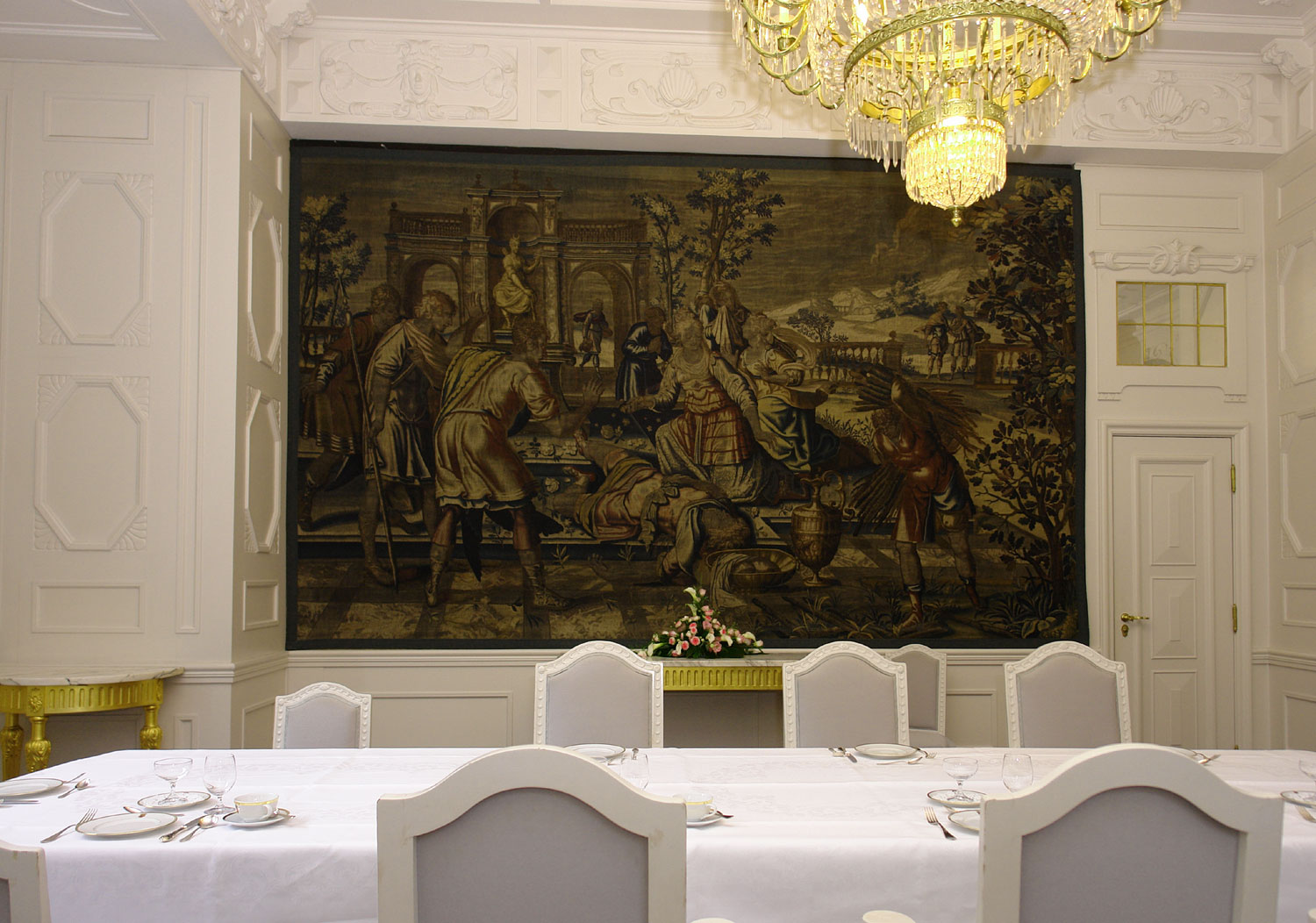
Tapestry Room

== Heritage listings ==
Since 1973, the New Town Hall has been listed as a historic monument.

A number of listed buildings are located in the immediate vicinity:

- the Bismarck equestrian statue, sculpted by Adolf von Hildebrand (1910),
- the Neptune fountain by Waldemar Otto (1991),
- the heralds by Rudolf Maison, re-established on the east side of the Town Hall in 2001 where they had stood between 1901 and 1941/42
- the bronze statue of the Town Musicians of Bremen by Gerhard Marks on the west side of the Town Hall (1953)
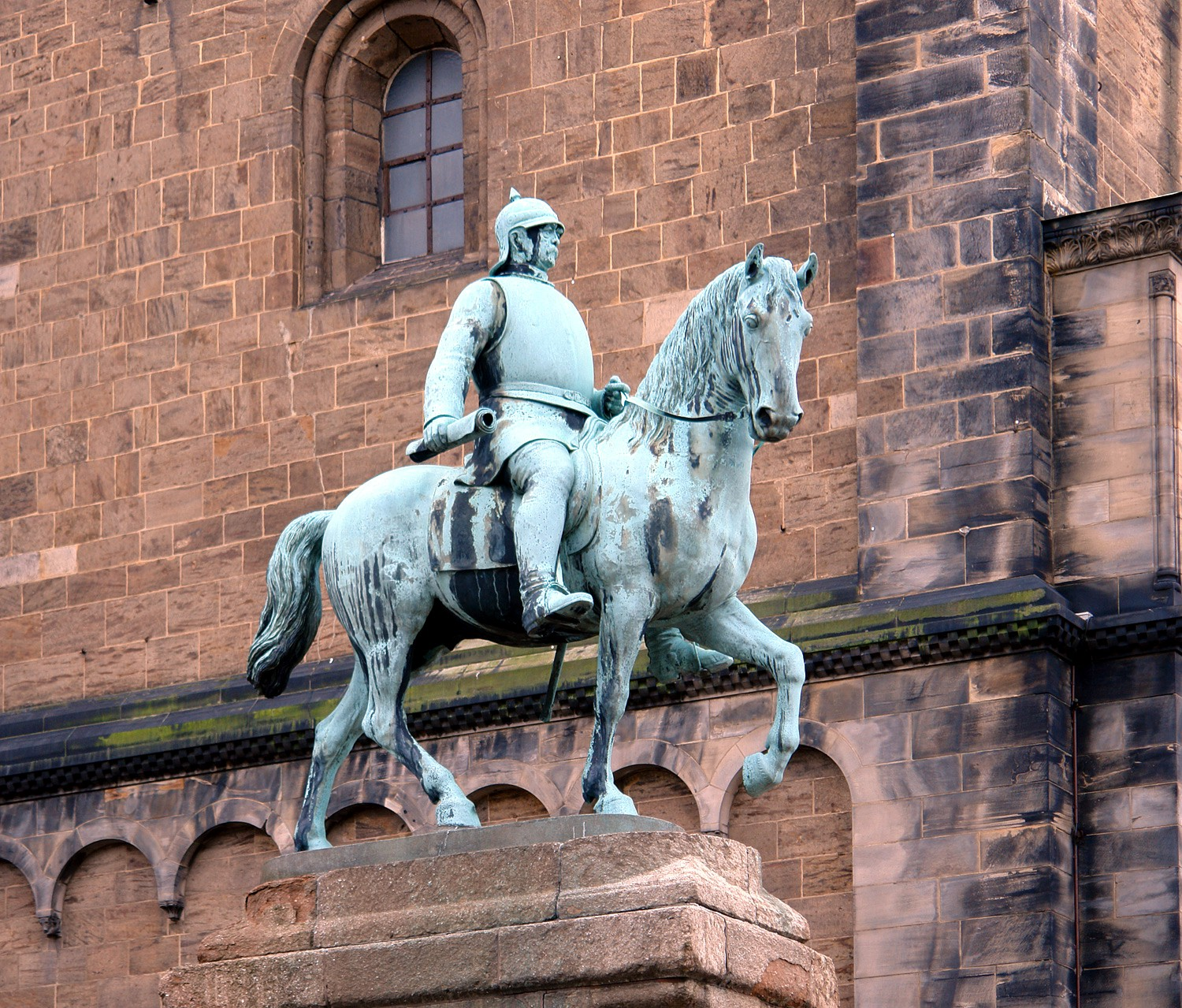
Equestrian statue of Bismarck

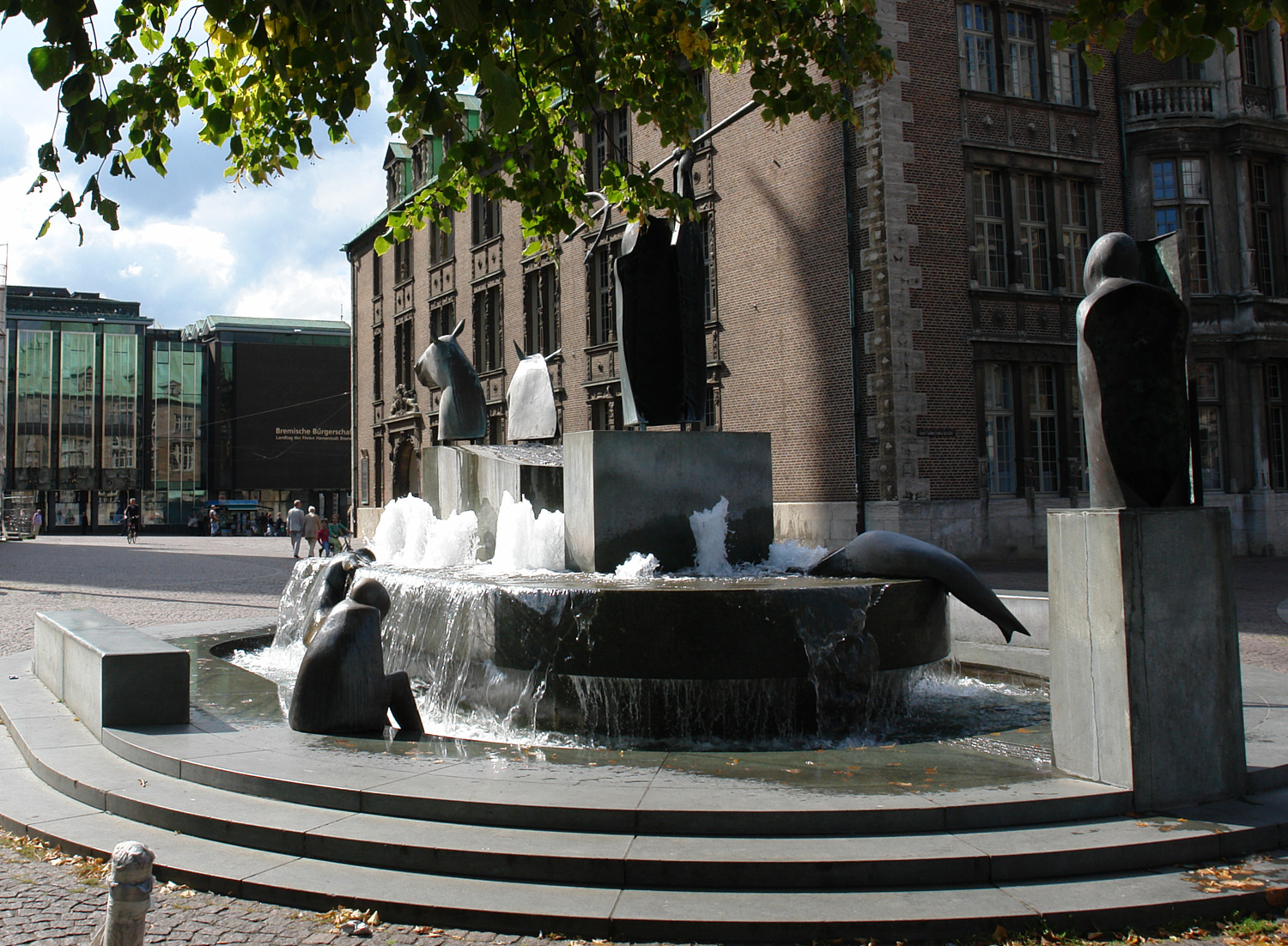
Neptune Fountain

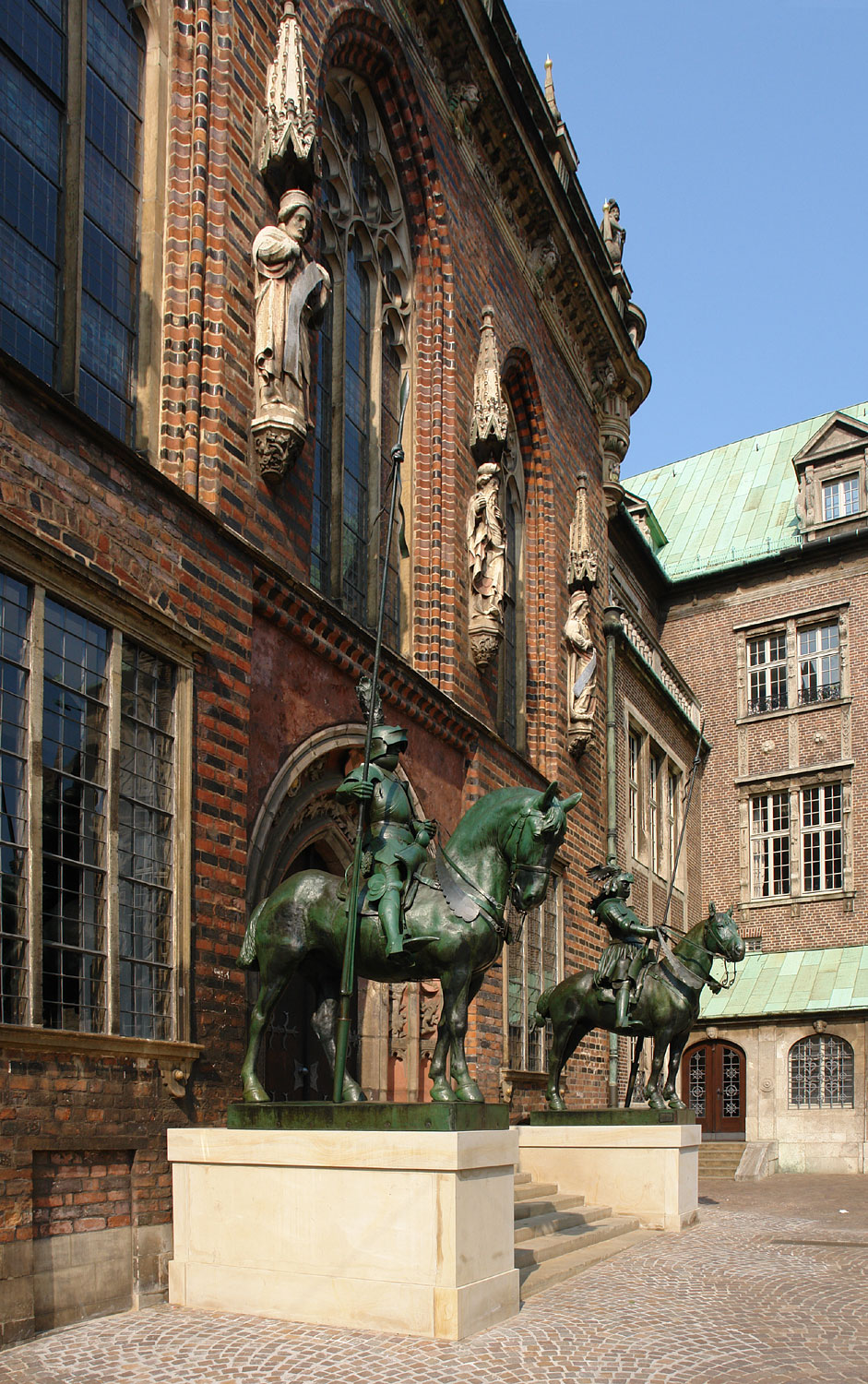
Herald

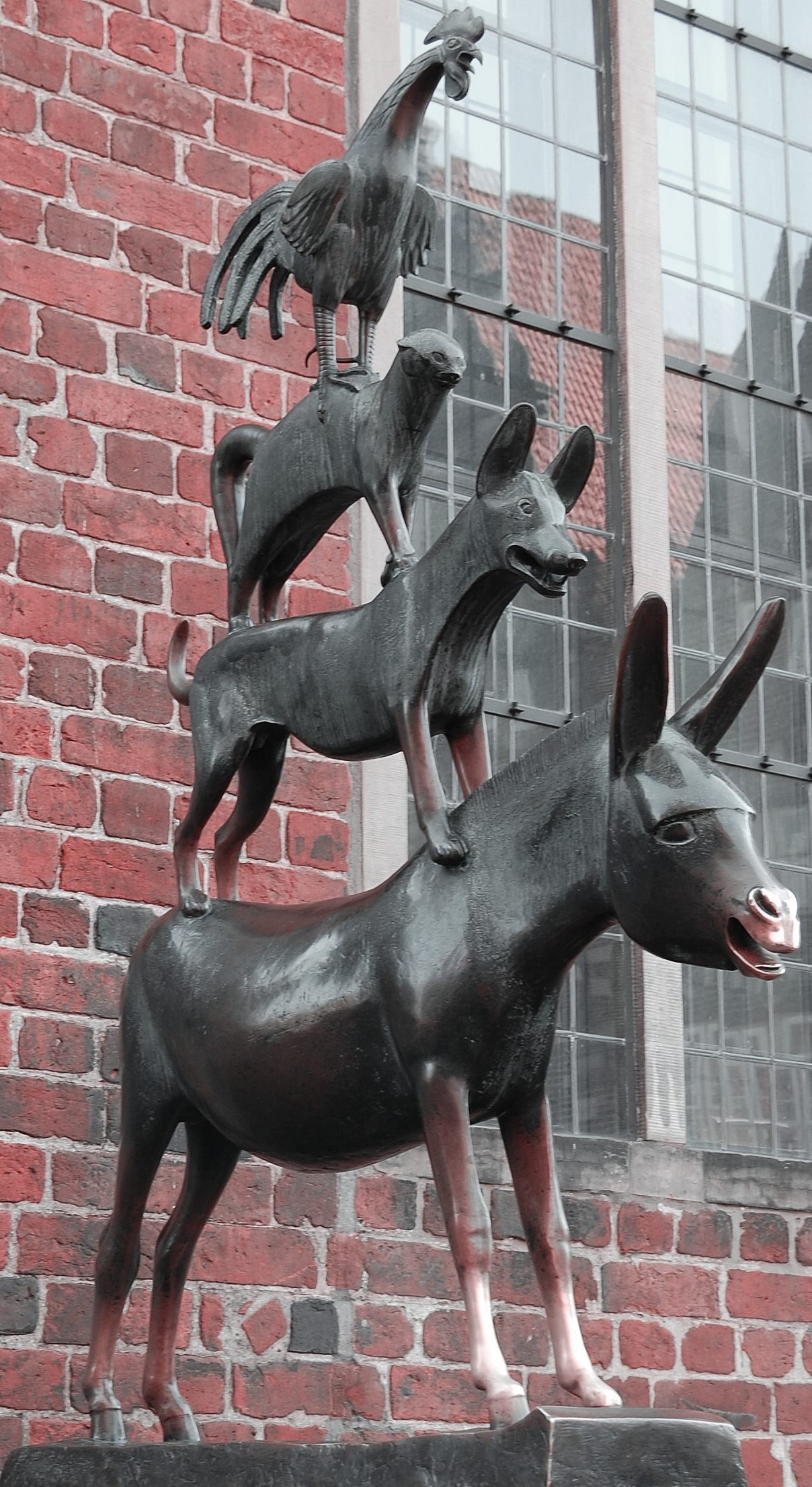
Bremen Town Musicians
