= Adolf von Hildebrand =

German sculptor (1847–1921)

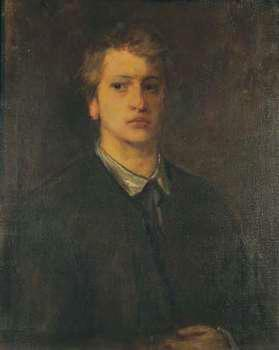
- Portrait by Hans von Marées (c. 1868)
- Born: 6 October 1847; Marburg, Kingdom of Prussia
- Died: 18 January 1921 (aged 73); Munich, Weimar Republic
- Resting place: Kirchhof Oberföhring, Oberfohring, Münchener Stadtkreis, Bavaria (Bayern), Germany
- Education: Academy of Fine Arts, Nuremberg, Academy of Fine Arts, Munich

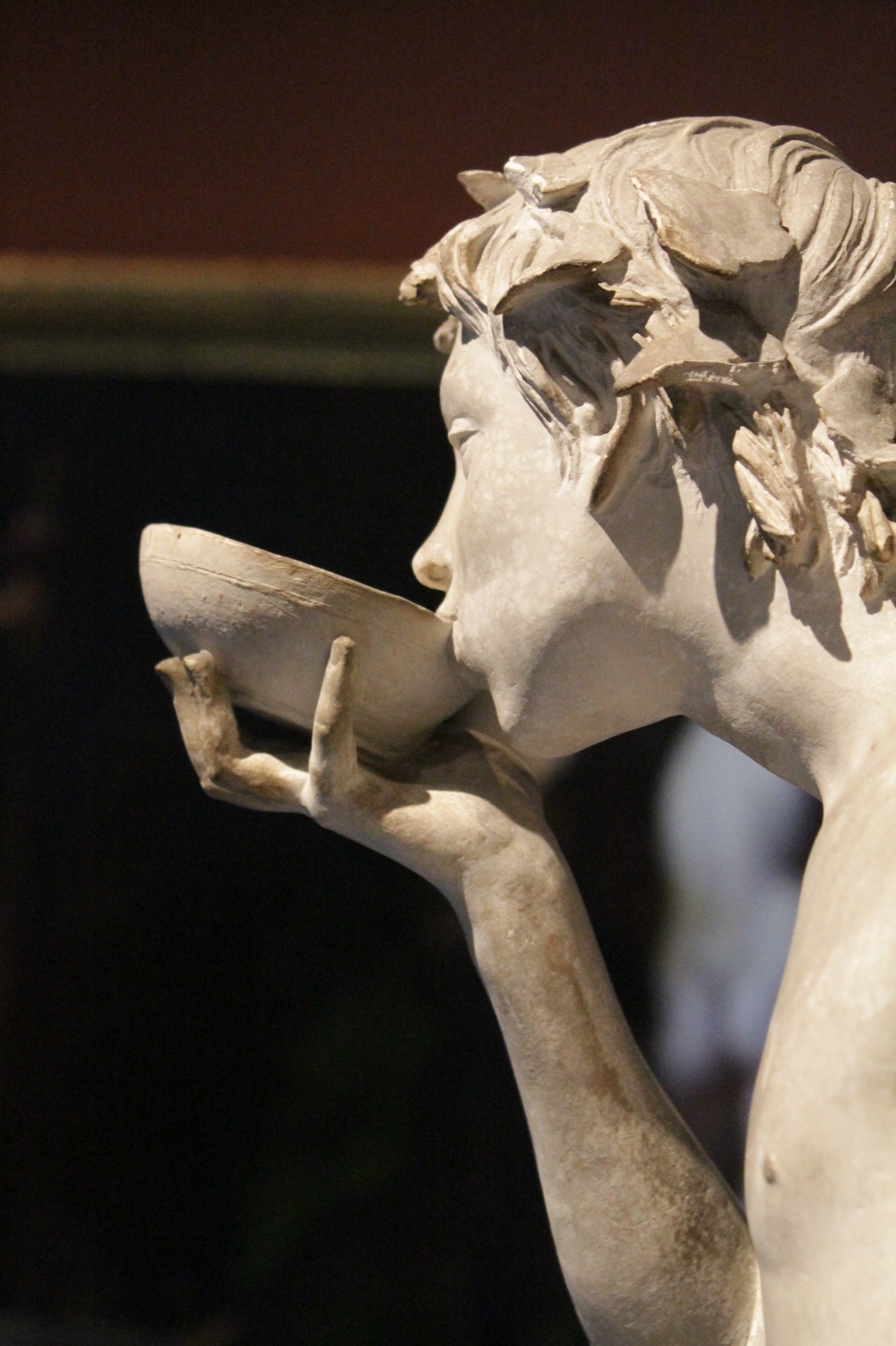
Drinking Youth 1872 by Adolf von Hildebrand, Albertinum, Dresden

Adolf von Hildebrand (6 October 1847 – 18 January 1921) was a German sculptor.

== Life ==
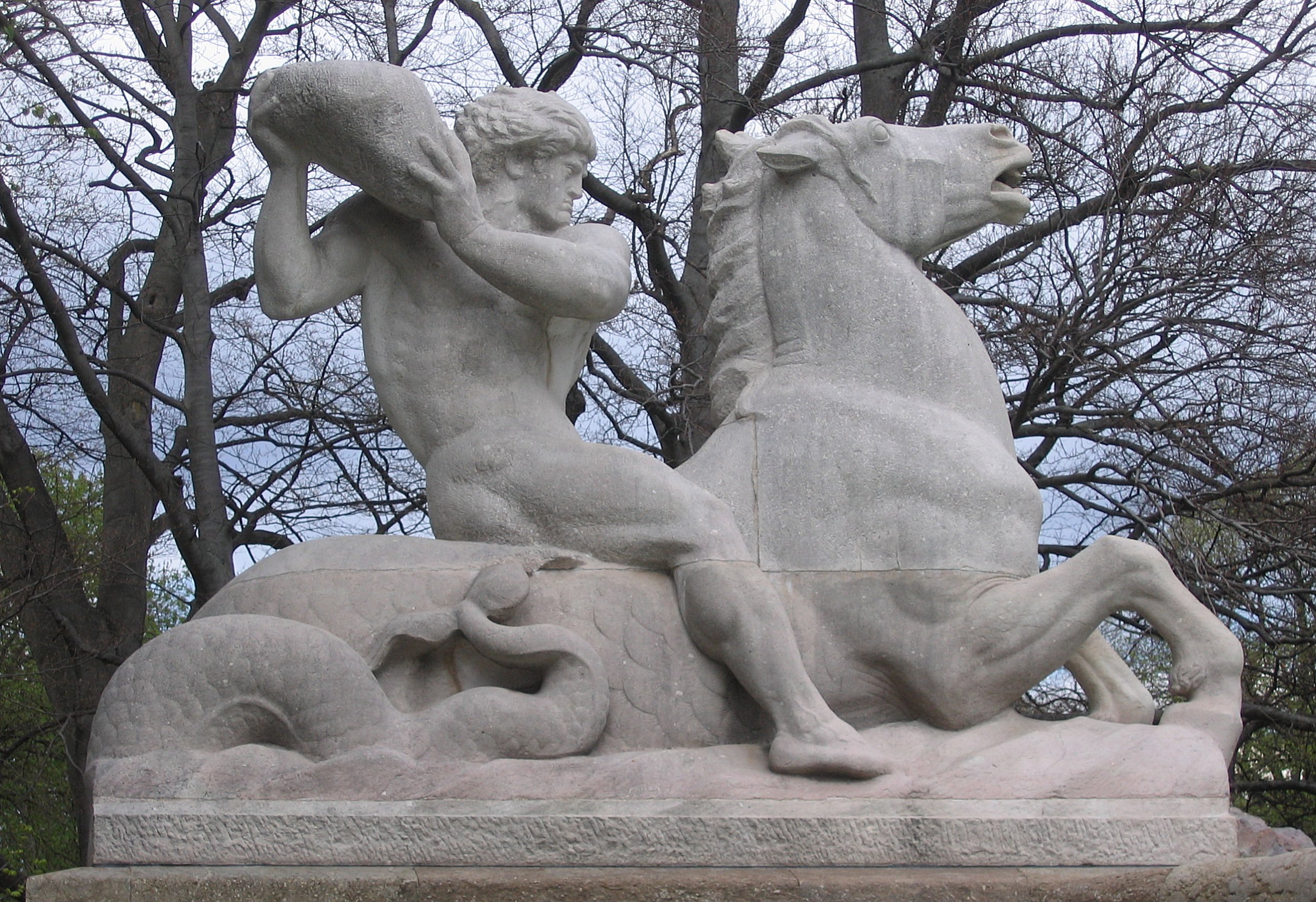
Sculpture from Hildebrand's Wittelsbacher Brunnen

Hildebrand was born at Marburg, the son of Marburg economics professor Bruno Hildebrand. He studied at the Academy of Fine Arts Nuremberg, with Kaspar von Zumbusch at the Munich Academy and with Rudolf Siemering in Berlin. From 1873 he lived in Florence in the St Francesco Monastery, a secularized sixteenth-century monastery.

A friend of Hans von Marées, he designed the architectural setting for the painter's murals in the library of the German Marine Zoological Institute at Naples (1873). He spent a significant amount of time in Munich after 1889, executing a monumental fountain there, the Wittelsbacher Brunnen. He is known for five monumental urban fountains and for the Bismarck monument in Bremen, unveiled in 1910.

Hildebrand worked in a Neo-classical tradition, and set out his artistic theories in his book Das Problem der Form in der Bildenden Kunst ("The Problem of Form in Painting and Sculpture"), published in 1893.

He was ennobled by the King of Bavaria in 1904.

He died in Munich in 1921.

== Family ==
In 1877 he married Irene Schäuffelen. They were parents of the painter Eva, Elizabeth, sculptor Irene Georgii-Hildebrand, Sylvie, Bertele, and Catholic theologian Dietrich von Hildebrand. His great-grandson is environmental leader Martin von Hildebrand.

== Critical opinion ==
In 1917, the American sculptor, conservative critic and author Lorado Taft, while bemoaning the direction the German sculpture was moving in, described Hildebrand as:

a master of the old school and Florentine tradition, whose example has been a constant gospel of good taste and sanity. Even today, when the whole world has gone after false gods, his influence continues to be felt and I wonder if the fact that in the midst of this revolution German sculpture, however fantastic, remains essentially sculpture, is not due largely to the life long precept and practice of this admirable representative of the craft.
