= Tami Oelfken =

German education reformer (1888–1957)

- Born: Marie Wilhelmine Oelfken; 25 June 1888; Blumenthal, Bremen, Germany
- Died: 7 April 1957 (aged 68); Munich, Bavaria, Germany
- Other names: Gina Teelen and other pseudonyms
- Occupations: Author teacher columnist campaigner for education reform school founder diarist
- Spouse: none
- Parent(s): Johann Heinrich Conrad Oelfken (1857–1927); Bertha Sophie Christa Heidmann (1866–1935)

Tami Oelfken (25 June 1888 – 7 April 1957) was a German teacher who became an author and controversial (especially at that time) education reformer.

The "Tami Oelfken Community School" which she set up in Berlin-Lichterfelde in 1928 was closed down by the Nazi authorities in 1934 on account of its "pacifist, communist and pro-Jewish tendencies". Attempts to re-open it in Paris and, later, to promote her education reform ideas in France and then in England came to nothing, and in 1939 she returned to Berlin where her uncompromising approach led to professional marginalisation. The focus of her activity was increasingly on her writing, though both the novels she produced for publication during the war years were banned, in one case before and in the other case shortly after publication. After 1945 there was a modest revival of interest in her work, but the ideas on education reform that she continued to promote with characteristic fixity failed to become part of the mainstream pedagogical agenda during her lifetime.

== Life ==
=== Family provenance ===
Marie Wilhelmine "Tami" Oelfken was born into a prosperous family in Blumenthal, then a commercially flourishing separate municipality, but subsequently subsumed into Bremen as a suburb down-river of the city centre. Oelfken's mother, born Bertha Sophie Christa Heidmann (1866–1935), was a gifted musician who successfully managed the household and reared seven children, of whom Tami was the second-born. Johann Heinrich Conrad Oelfken (1857–1927), her father, was a businessman who since 1884 had been employed as shipping manager with Bremer Woll-Kämmerei, a world-wide trader and manufacturer of wool and related products. He also served as a town councillor, which included thirty years as deputy mayor of Blumenthal. He was for many years remembered as a leading citizen of the town. The family lived in a large house at Langen Straße 54/56, next to the site later chosen for Blumenthal's new town hall, and with a garden that ran down to the Weser.

=== Early years and intergenerational tensions ===
Oelfken attended the secondary all-girls' school (Höhere Mädchenschule) in nearby Vegesack and then moved on to the August Kippenberg teacher training college in Bremen, passing her teaching exams in 1908, still aged only nineteen. The decision that she should become a teacher had come from her parents. Oelfken had resisted it. She had been born with a physical defect involving her hips which was clearly visible to observers. According to an autobiographical essay that she wrote in 1948 one of her legs had ended up 16 cm (slightly more than 6 inches) longer than the other. She later learned to joke that her handicap made it "difficult to run away", but as a young woman she seems to have found it hard to see any funny side to her physical condition. Commentators suggest that it was above all the reactions that her hip problems triggered in others that she resented, and that accounted for a sharp tongue and a stubborn streak that marked her out throughout her life. (There are also powerful indications that Oelfken may have inherited her stubbornness from her father.) The traditional career choice for young women from her social background would have involved marriage and motherhood, which was precisely what she looked forward to, but her mother told her that she would never find a man to love and care for her: she cried a lot over that. Remaining a spinster and becoming a teacher would provide her with a measure of financial independence and social status. Oelfken knew from a relatively early age that she wanted to become a writer, but accepted the decision that she should train for a teaching career. Her resentment later manifested itself in aggressive hostility against the entire schools system, and more immediately in her dislike of the "red plush" which she associated with the then fashionable furnishings of her parents' family home, and which she excoriated in poems and short stories. When she succeeded in getting some of her verses published in the Sunday edition of the Bremer Nachrichten newspaper, her father's reaction was threatening: "I completely forbid it! Love poetry – after all, it is my good name!" (Note: "Das verbitt ich mir ganz entschieden! Liebesgedichte – schließlich ist es mein guter Name!") From Heinrich Oelfken's perspective, his threats in the immediate term had their desired effect. The association between her writing and the [parental] veto was lodged firmly in Tami Oelfken's mind. Most sources are silent concerning her childhood and adolescence: in her final published book she would write simply, "I will take the secret of my loveless childhood to the grave". (Note: "Das Geheimnis meiner lieblosen Kindheit werde ich mit ins Grab nehmen.") After the disagreement over the published poems, the parent-daughter relationship was evidently a distanced one.

=== Newly qualified reformist teacher ===
Following qualification, Oelfken obtained her first teaching job at Ohrwege, a district of Zwischenahn (near Oldenburg, which was the city in which her mother had been born and grown up). She obtained a more permanent post in 1909 at Grohn, a northern suburb of Bremen, and very close both to the school she had herself attended a few years earlier and to her parents' family home. At the school in Grohn, where she taught between 1909 and 1917, she conducted her lessons in a child focused manner. She had familiarised herself with the psychological and pedagogical ideas of the pioneering Bremen reformers Heinrich Scharrelmann and Fritz Gansberg, and from these she drew much of her inspiration. She also joined the Bund Entschiedener Schulreformer, an association dedicated to the promotion of education reform.

Although she was now back in the northern suburbs of Bremen, there was evidently no suggestion that Oelfken should return to live with her parents at the spacious family home in which she had grown up. She rented a little house on the south bank of the Lesum, a tributary to the Weser on the edge of the Werderland, a large marshy area that would have provided rich pickings for her landlord, a river fisherman from an established family of local fisherfolk. Here she could work undisturbed. To the horror of her own parents and, increasingly, of the parents of pupils in her charge, she became ever more evangelical about implementing the controversial education reforms to which she had become committed. There were complaints to the school governors. During this period she acquired a lover, the third serious love of her life. He carved her initials and his in the bark of a beech tree and then left for the front. He was shot dead.

=== Transfer and the politics of Barkenhoff ===
In response to parents' complaints, in 1917 the school governors arranged for Oelfken to be transferred to Tarmstedt in the flat lands north of Bremen, described in one source as a "peat village" (Moordorf). It was here that she came across members of the so-called Worpswede community, a colony of artist-intellectuals based in the area who were by this time coming to be associated with pacifism and other liberal-reformist causes. She was, in particular, influenced by Heinrich Vogeler. She later confessed that his influence on her had proven more enduring than that of anyone else. (Note: "Sein Einfluss auf mich war nachhaltiger, als irgend ein anderer...") Vogeler's home, the "Barkenhoff", was the meeting point for a group of like-minded artists and intellectuals. Here he set up an idealistic communist labour school. Oelfken and Vogeler would discuss together developing a primer for it, drawing their inspiration not so much from the recent (and still unfolding) October Revolution as from the beliefs and practices of the Tolstoyan movement. It was under the influence of this "Barkenhoff Group" that during 1918 Oelfken became a member of the anti-war Spartacus League, which by the end of that year had become one of the twin founding pillars (along with the Independent Social Democratic Party) of Germany's Communist Party. She was a delegate to the National Schools Conference held at Berlin during the middle of June 1920: the backwash from the previous year's uprisings was still very much in the air, and the theme of the conference was reform of the schools system. (The conclusion was a series of compromises that disappointed the more extremist reformist factions.)

Vogeler left on the first of his several lengthy visits to the Soviet Union around 1923 (accompanied by Sonja, the daughter of Julian Marchlewski, whom he would later marry): Oelfken had probably already left Worpswede by this point. She settled for a while at Gotha where she became part of a "worker community" of young teachers. During the Kapp Putsch of 1920 she joined in on the side of those fighting to defend the new republic against right-wing paramilitaries keen to return the country to a more autocratic government structure. In Gotha she joined comrades on the barricades in order to tend to the wounds of those who had been injured. In 1922 she resigned from the Bremen schools service.

=== Teacher-campaigner ===
By 1922 Oelfken was more convinced than ever that the existing state schools failed to match up to contemporary societal needs. That year she moved to Berlin-Spandau and resumed her teaching career. Towards the end of the year she became involved in the so-called "Spandau Schools Battle" (Spandauer Schulkampf), vehemently opposing corporal punishment and the prescriptive requirements that governed school prayers. By the end of 1922 she had resigned (again) from government service, which this time meant resigning from teaching within the Berlin publicly funded schools system. From now on she was able to work as a teacher only in the (relatively small, and some would have said, quirky) private education sector.

While she continued to campaign for schools reform, she also accepted a teaching-related post at Hellerau, just outside Dresden in connection with an experimental school newly established by the Scottish education reformer, A. S. Neill. Neill's focus was on the pupils themselves. These were free to decide for themselves whether or not they wanted to attend lessons. He abolished division of pupils into conventional classes and "paradoxical sanctions", while introducing private lessons. Oelfken found herself in sympathy with many of Neill's ideas. However, the period was one of intensifying economic crisis and by the end of 1923 Neill had been driven by economic pressures to relocate his pedagogical experiments to Vienna. Oelfken returned to Berlin where she combined a succession of teaching jobs with a steady stream of newspaper articles on the subject of education reform.

In 1925 she took a teaching post with the privately funded Benario School, described as a "living community school" (Lebensgemeinschaftsschule). Later during the 1920s she worked for the Dahlem Communist School, fulfilling on its behalf a contract with representatives of the Soviet expatriate community. This involved applying reformist ideas to devising a two years education and training programme designed for the children of the Soviet embassy and the (already implausibly large) Soviet trade mission in Berlin. Many sources indicate that during 1926/27 she was herself teaching at Berlin's school for the children of Russian diplomats and other expatriates. In the end the relationship with the Soviets floundered, however, both in response to her pedagogical ideas and on account of her increasingly critical attitude towards Communism.

=== Tami Oelfken Community School ===
In 1927 her father died and in 1928 Oelfken's share of the inheritance came through, affording her a hitherto unfamiliar measure of financial independence. By the end of the year she had overcome the inevitable bureaucratic hurdles and opened the Tami Oelfken Community School in Berlin-Wilmersdorf, winning – as one commentator later wrote – immediate plaudits from artists and intellectuals. Sources differ over whether it was here, or at some point during her earlier teaching career, that she acquired the soubriquet "Tami", a contraction of Tante Mieze (Aunt Mieze, for Marie Wilhelmine), the affectionate name she was given by children whom she taught. A school for the parents in "Seminar format" was a necessary element, integrated into the set-up. Parents were required to spend two terms during which they attended lectures concerning the school's educational objectives and community-working approach, and including study of the in-depth theoretical and practical issues and questions arising. Oelfken funded the enterprise from her own resources. She had evidently learned many lessons from her brief exposure to Alexander Neill pioneering ideas on education reform which she had encountered during her time at Dresden-Hellerau. One of the core founding principles, regarded by the mainstream education establishment at the time as radical, was a holistic integration of teaching as a shared responsibility between schools and parents.

Despite the challenges presented by surging political and social polarisation in Germany, till 1933 Oelfken ran the school successfully. Many children from left-wing intellectual backgrounds, children of publishers. writers and artists, attended the school. Oelfken had published her first pedagogical book, covering questions of primary school work and schools reform during the 1920s, at or before the time when her own school had been set up, and in 1931 she followed this up with a less specialist volume, the first of her innovative children's books, Peter kann zaubern (Peter can do magic). There was a second children's book in 1932: Nickelmann erlebt Berlin (Nickelmann experiences Berlin). In the prosperous suburb of Blumenthal where she and her six siblings had grown up, and where her name was well remembered, her "political adventures and escapades" were noted and found unacceptable. She was dismissed as a "communist" or as a "non-person" who did not even take the trouble to check the quality of her literary texts.

=== Dictatorship and exile ===
Regime change at the start of 1933 was followed by a rapid transition to one-party dictatorship. The school survived 1933, but in 1934 it was closed down by the authorities, who cited its "pacifist, communist and pro-Jewish tendencies" in support of the closure. Oelfken herself was served with a lifetime teaching ban.

She now moved to Paris, taking all her belongings with her from Berlin, including the equipment for her school which she attempted to re-establish in Paris, which was already home to a large and growing number of political and/or race refugees from Nazi Germany. She was unsuccessful, however. According to at least one source she then attempted to re-create her school in southern France, but again without success. She may have returned briefly to Germany in 1935, having left her property behind and lost it, but most sources make no mention of this. It appears that by 1935 she had relocated again, this time to London, where (again) attempts to re-establish her school for the benefit of the German expatriate community were thwarted, which at least one source attributes to the devious bureaucratic machinations of the Gestapo. During 1938 there were lengthy visits to Italy, France and Berlin. In 1939 it was the implementation of savagely restrictive currency controls which persuaded her back to Berlin permanently, where she was able to support herself, up to a point, through her writing.

=== Frustrated writer ===
Unable to teach in Germany, following her teaching ban, in 1936 Oelfken started contributing short stories and pieces on everyday matters in the Berlin magazine Mode und Heim (Fashion and Home). She wrote under the pseudonyms "Frau Helga" and "Onkel Jill". Since Mode und Heim was a mass circulation publication, it can be inferred that she managed to avoid matters which might be seen as contentious by the Nazi Party. Between 1936 and 1942 the magazine published forty substantial contributions from "Frau Helga" and "Onkel Jill".

=== Tine ===
During 1940 she also wrote her first adult novel, Tine (albeit subsequently renamed). The focus of the semi-autobiographical novel is on the living conditions of the Polish workers being employed by the cotton mill at Blumenthal. It also touches on the environmental degradation associated with cotton production. There is something strikingly prescient in the author's warning against ruthless short-term exploitation of people and of the environment. The book, published early in 1941, earned her an invitation to a meeting with the Gestapo. Her interlocutors had familiarised themselves with its contents, and were concerned by the Polenfreundlichkeit (friendliness towards Poland) which the book demonstrated. She was released following the interview, however, having convinced her questioners that the issues raised could be seen as inconsequential because the book was very clearly set not in the present but in the late nineteenth century. The book, however, was strongly criticised in its publisher's annual appraisal, and in 1941 it was included on the government's List of damaging and undesirable writing (Liste des schädlichen und unerwünschten Schrifttums). Noa Kiepenheuer, the formidable wife of Gustav Kiepenheuer whose family publishing firm had published the book, was a personal friend of Oelfken. The publisher nevertheless saw the government's point, and distribution of the book was reversed. It would be republished with a completely new name and through a different publisher only in 1947.

=== Die Persianermütze ===
Her second novel, Die Persianermütze (The Persian Cap) was published in 1942. The book was again semi-autobiographical, and could be seen, loosely, as a sequel to Tine, though she chose a different publisher: Bergstadtverlag Wilhelm Gottlieb Korn. At the heart of the novel was a young girl in search of the true worth of life, judged not in terms of rational utility or sporting prowess, but simply in spiritual terms. This book, again, failed to appease the authorities. Copies were confiscated within a few weeks of publication.

=== Ban ===
It was also in 1942 that Oelfken was excluded from the "Reichskulturkammer" (national artists' association) which had been set up in 1933 under the auspices of the Propaganda Minister as a device whereby the government might exercise significant control over artistic output in Nazi Germany. She was also served, expressly, with a life-time writing ban. Writing had become Oelfken's only means of supporting herself, and this was effectively closed off to her. She was no longer in a position to help Jewish friends, and had to depend on friends for food, shelter and supplies of paper. The paper was important because, as it later turned out, she had been keeping a detailed "logbook" of life in war-time Germany since 1939. She secretly continued to write her wartime diary in defiance of the de facto writing ban. The diaries were edited for publication and appeared in 1946 under the title Fahrt durch das Chaos: Logbuch vom Mai 1939–1945 (Journey through Chaos:Logbook ...), with re-issues appearing in 1955 and 2004. She recorded discussions with people from Alsace about the German invasion, and recorded what she knew of the experiences of women who had been detained in Ravensbrück. One of those concentration camp survivors was Helen Ernst, the woman who had provided the illustrations for the second of Oelfken's children's books back in 1932. She quoted from her own indignant letters, addressed to the schools administration service in Baden, in which she had complained of the indoctrination and threats to which school children were being subjected. She also retained and/or reproduced in her diaries the official government mandated article on suppression of the "officers' uprising" in July 1944, which appeared without further commentary from the diarist, except that the report appeared next to poetic vignettes on the beauties of the gardens near to where she was then staying. By the time it was ready for publication, the book of her war-time diaries also included, as a significant theme, a critical analysis of the language used by the authorities in Nazi Germany.

Between 1942 and 1944, Oelfken regularly moved her base in order to avoid being spied upon. Along with her diaries, she was able to write for foreign German language newspapers, using pseudonyms. There are indications that by the middle of 1944 she was living in a form of internal exile at Überlingen (Lake Constance) in the extreme south of Germany. She was still there when war ended in May 1945, and she indeed lived at Überlingen throughout 1945.

=== Germany divided ===
After the war there were six more books, some of which could be classified as novels and some more directly as autobiographical works, based on the author's own experiences. The Oelfken's hopes for some major literary rehabilitation, or a wider acceptance of her reformist ideas on education remained unfulfilled during her lifetime. It was nevertheless striking that, with Germany now divided, she was one of relatively few authors who found their work accepted by the authorities and by (some) readers in both the western occupation zones (after the Berlin Blockade in May 1949, West Germany) and the Soviet occupation zone (after October 1949 East Germany. Her most successful book in the immediate aftermath of the war was probably Fahrt durch das Chaos (1946), based on her war-time diaries. In what remained of Blumenthal, the municipality/suburb where she had lived as a child, there was particular interest in "Maddo Clüver: Die Konturen einer Kinderlandschaf" (1947), a reissuance of her 1941 novel "Tine" which the National Socialists had banned. Through its careful study of the lives of Polish workers employed – allegedly during the nineteenth century – at the town's cotton mill, "Maddo Clüver" provided the townsfolk with a vision of their own respectable municipality, viewed through Oelfken's bluntly critical yet insightful prism.

After 1947, Oelfken worked for Radio Bremen and several other broadcasters. This ensured that she was not completely forgotten, and her diary based "Logbuch" continued to attract a steady trickle of readers. Her controversialist instincts were not stilled, however: she was one of many German writers (and others) appalled by the way the east–west rivalry was being institutionalised into ever more rigid and dangerous Cold War tensions.

=== Decline in fortunes ===
In response to her campaigning, in concert with other authors, for rapprochement between East and West, on 8 May 1951 she found herself described in print as a Communist. The judgement appeared in a poorly researched article from the critic Paul Hühnerfeld in the widely circulated West German weekly newspaper Die Zeit. Hühnerfeld had taken exception to her 1941 diary entries, now reprinted in "Logbook", which had been included more recently in an anthology of pacifist texts. "Communism" was a familiar accusation for Oelfken, and there was no more factual basis for it in the 1950s than there had been in the 1930s, but with the sirens of McCarthyism in full cry across the Atlantic it carried a chilling frisson that would have been absent in the 1930s, when such accusations came only from the National Socialist propaganda machine. It was reported that she had "dangerously pacifist ideas". Once more, mutterings surfaced that Oelfken was an "enemy of the state". Less than a week after the article appeared, her publisher dropped her. At this time Oelfken liked to quote as her eleventh commandment, "Do not stay silent." There is an irony to be enjoyed in the fact that the book in which she used this injunction as a chapter heading almost immediately became unobtainable because out of print. (Note: "Du sollst nicht schweigen…".)

=== Compensation ===
As soon as the war was over, Oelfken launched a compensation application in the courts of the occupied territories that later become West Germany. She sought restitution for persecution suffered during the Hitler years. She was required to submit a huge number of documents which she had very great difficulty in obtaining. The hearings lasted till 1954. Eventually, in February 1955, a compromise was agreed, whereby she received damages of 11,000 Marks or 13,200 Marks. (Sources differ.) (Note: In order to get a better feeling for this figure – which Oelfken thought was much less compensation than she deserved – the list price in West Germany for a basic Volkswagen Beetle in 1954 was 3,950 Marks. The more luxurious "export model" was listed in West Germany at 4,850 Marks. However, there is no direct read-across to twenty-first century prices, since in 1950s Germany relatively few people could afford to buy a car.) The quantum of the damages took no account of the health damage she had suffered, nor of the significant value of the property she had transferred from Berlin to Paris 1934 which she had lost when forced by changes to the currency regulations to return to Berlin in 1939.

=== Final years ===
By 1952 Oelfken's public profile was greatly diminished. During her final years she nevertheless conducted various school events and presentations in and around Bremen. Under the umbrella title "The world speaks through the poet" (Note: "Aus dem Dichter spricht die Welt") she gave presentations on various authors from around the world. She remained passionate in calling for improvements in international understanding. Her great hope that the "Logbook" from her war-time diaries might contribute constructively to dealing with the past and making possible a new start, possibly through reflecting on a more vegan approach to life, did not materialise, however. By this time she had become, in the words of one commentator, one of the most ignored authors of the post-war period. The socialist idealist spent her final years living a minimalist existence at her home in Überlingen by the Bodensee. On 7 April 1957 she died in Munich following an operation. Her body ended up in the Oelfken family crypt under the cemetery back in Blumenthal.

After her death her work was slowly rediscovered.

== Recognition / celebration (selection) ==
- Tami-Oelfken-Straße (Tami Oelfken Street) in Bremen-Kattenturm was named in her honour in 1968.
- A school near her childhood home was named "Tami-Oelfken-Schule" in her honour in 2004.
- Since 2018 there has been a Tami-Oelfken-Straße in a new residential district of Oldenburg (which is also home to the Tami Oelfken Gesellschaft e.V. (Tami Oelfken Society).)

== Publications (selection) ==
- Nickelmann erlebt Berlin, 1931
- Peter kann zaubern, 1932
- Tine, Kiepenheuer, Berlin 1940, banned; 1947 re-released as Maddo Clüver. Die Konturen einer Kinderlandschaft (Curt Brauns, Wedel)
- Die Persianermütze, 1942 (banned shortly after publication)
- Die Sonnenuhr, Wulff-Verlag, 1946
- Fahrt durch das Chaos, 1946, Neuausgabe 2003 (Libelle Verlag)
- Zauber der Artemis, Alster Verlag, Wedel 1947
- Maddo Clüver, Alster Verlag, Wedel 1947
- Logbuch, Alster Verlag, Wedel 1948
- Die Kukucksspucke, Verlag der Nation, 1954
- Stine vom Löh, Novelle, Bertelsmann Verlag, Gütersloh 1953
- Text in Bremen einst und jetzt. Eine Chronik, Eilers & Schünemann Verlag, 1955
- Traum am Morgen, Kiepenheuer, Weimar 1955
- Die Penaten, 1957
