= Northwest Metropolitan Region =

Northwest Metropolitan Region Metropolregion Nordwest
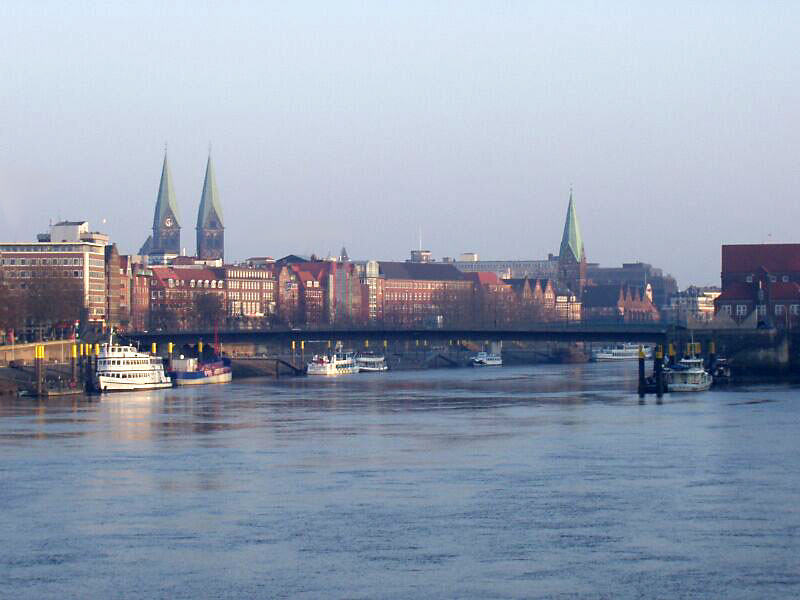
- Bremen

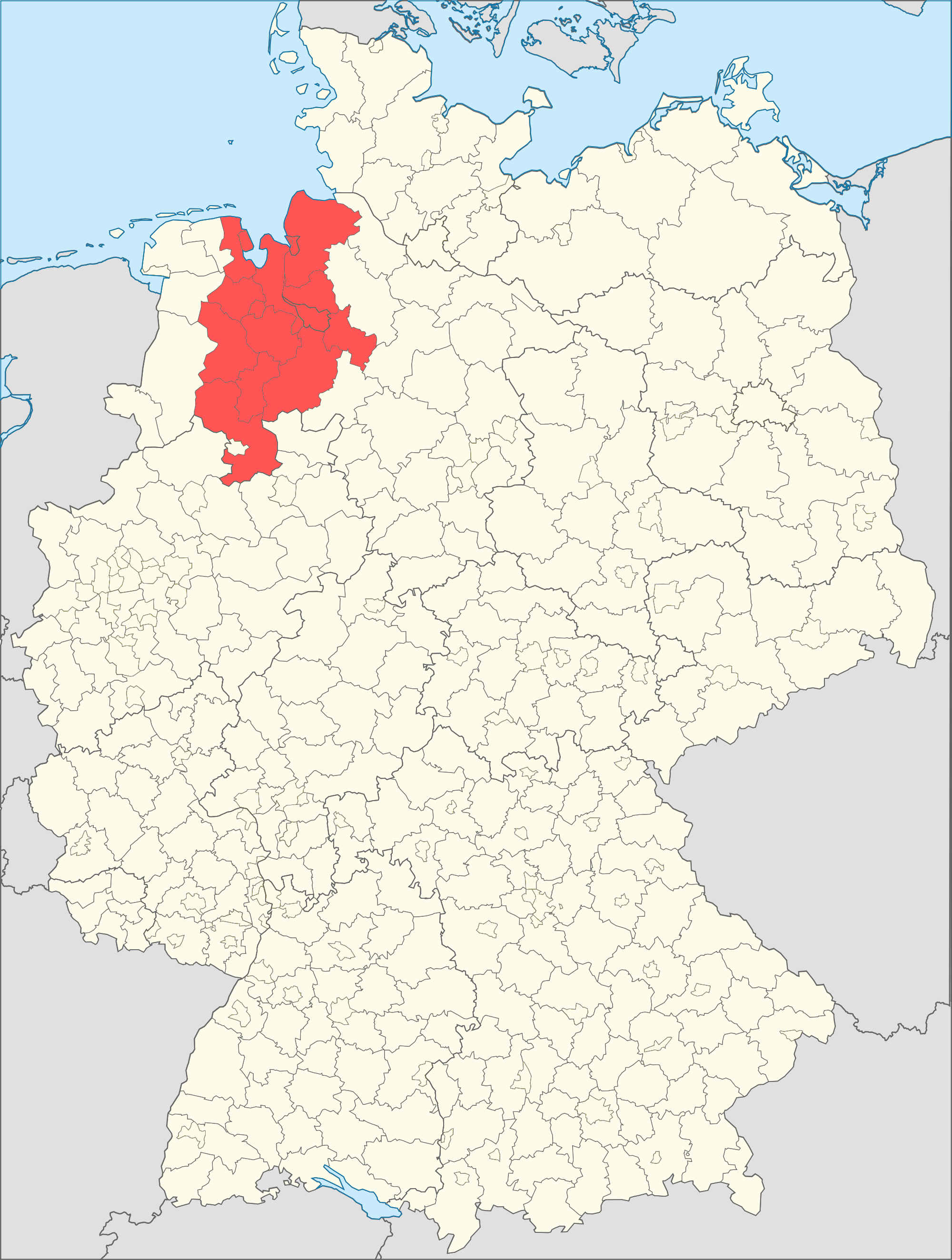
- Location of the Northwest Metropolitan Region in Germany
- Country: Germany
- States: Lower Saxony

Area
  - Metro: 13,770 km^{2} (5,320 sq mi)

Population
  - Metro: 2,797,706
  - Metro density: 203.2/km^{2} (526.2/sq mi)

GDP
  - Metro: €108.006 billion (2021)
- Time zone: UTC+1 (CET)
- Website: www.metropolregion-nordwest.de

The European Northwest Metropolitan Region (German: Metropolregion Nordwest), officially Metropolitan Region of Bremen/Oldenburg (German: Metropolregion Bremen/Oldenburg) is one of the eleven metropolitan regions in Germany. It covers the area of the Free Hanseatic City of Bremen with its cities of Bremen and Bremerhaven and parts of the state of Lower Saxony. As of 2022, the region had almost 2.8 million residents.

== History ==
The region was designated on 28 April 2005 by the German Ministerial Conference for Regional Development (Ministerkonferenz für Raumordnung) or MKRO as a European metropolitan region on the basis of its international links through several ports and airports, its diverse industries and research institutions (universities and technical colleges) and its good municipal cooperation. Prior to that, regional bodies and institutions had decided in a few weeks on a joint resolution calling for recognition as a European metropolitan region. This was formally signed in Jever on 12 April 2005.

The metropolitan region had a historical forerunner in the Département des Bouches du Weser in the time of the Napoleonic occupation; and the two overlap to a large extent.

== Composition ==
=== Cities ===
- Bremen
- Bremerhaven
- Delmenhorst
- Oldenburg
- Wilhelmshaven

=== Districts ===
- Ammerland
- Cloppenburg
- Cuxhaven
- Diepholz
- Friesland
- Oldenburg
- Osnabrück
- Osterholz
- Vechta
- Verden
- Wesermarsch
