= Flag of Bremen =

Bremen
- Bremer Landesflagge (Speckflagge)
- Use: Civil flag
- Proportion: 2:3
- Design: A red and white flag.
- Bremer Dienstflagge
- Use: Civil and state flag
- Proportion: 2:3
- Design: A red and white flag defaced with the coat of arms.
- Bremer Staatsflagge
- Use: State flag
- Proportion: 2:3
- Design: A red and white flag defaced with the flag version of the coat of arms (Flaggenwappen).
- Landesdienstflagge der bremischen Schiffahrt
- Use: State flag
- Proportion: 2:3
- Adopted: 1891-1892; 1952
- Design: A red and white flag defaced with the flag version of the coat of arms (Flaggenwappen) and a blue anchor in the hoist canton.

The flag of Bremen (used by both the city of Bremen, Germany, and the state Free Hanseatic City of Bremen, Germany) consists of at least eight equal horizontal stripes of red alternating with white, and checked at the hoist. It is colloquially known as Speckflagge (bacon flag). The civil flag does not contain the Bremen coat of arms. The state flag exists in three versions

- The Dienstflagge, which is defaced with the middle coat of arms.
- The Staatsflagge, which is defaced with the flag version of the coat of arms and usually has twelve instead of eight stripes.
- The Dienstflagge der bremischen Schiffahrt, which is defaced with the flag version of the coat of arms in the centre and a blue anchor in a white canton. It is used on state buildings used for shipping and navigation, and as the jack on Bremen ships.

== History ==
Hanseatic flag of Bremen

Service flag for state ships and state buildings of the Navy (1891–1892)

State flag (German Empire)

Pilot flag (1935–1945)

Flag of the naval service (1893–1921)

Flag of the pilot administration, Bremen (1895–1918)

Flag of the Customs Administration (1895–1918)

Flag of the naval service (1921–1933)

Flag of the Customs Administration (1921–1933)

Flag of the naval service (1933–1935)

Argo Reederei house flag (1896–1922)

House flag flown by Hamburg-Bremer Afrika-Linie. (1887–1939)

D. G. Neptun house flag (1873–1974)

DDG Hansa house flag (1881–1980)

Norddeutscher Lloyd house flag (1857–1970)

Rickmers Group house flag (1982–present)

Roland-Linie house flag (1905–1959)

Unterweser Reederei house flag (1890–present)

F. A. Vinnen & Co. house flag (1819–present)

D. H. Wätjen & Co. house flag (1821–1918)

== See also ==
- Coat of arms of Bremen
- Flags of German states
