= Universum Science Center =

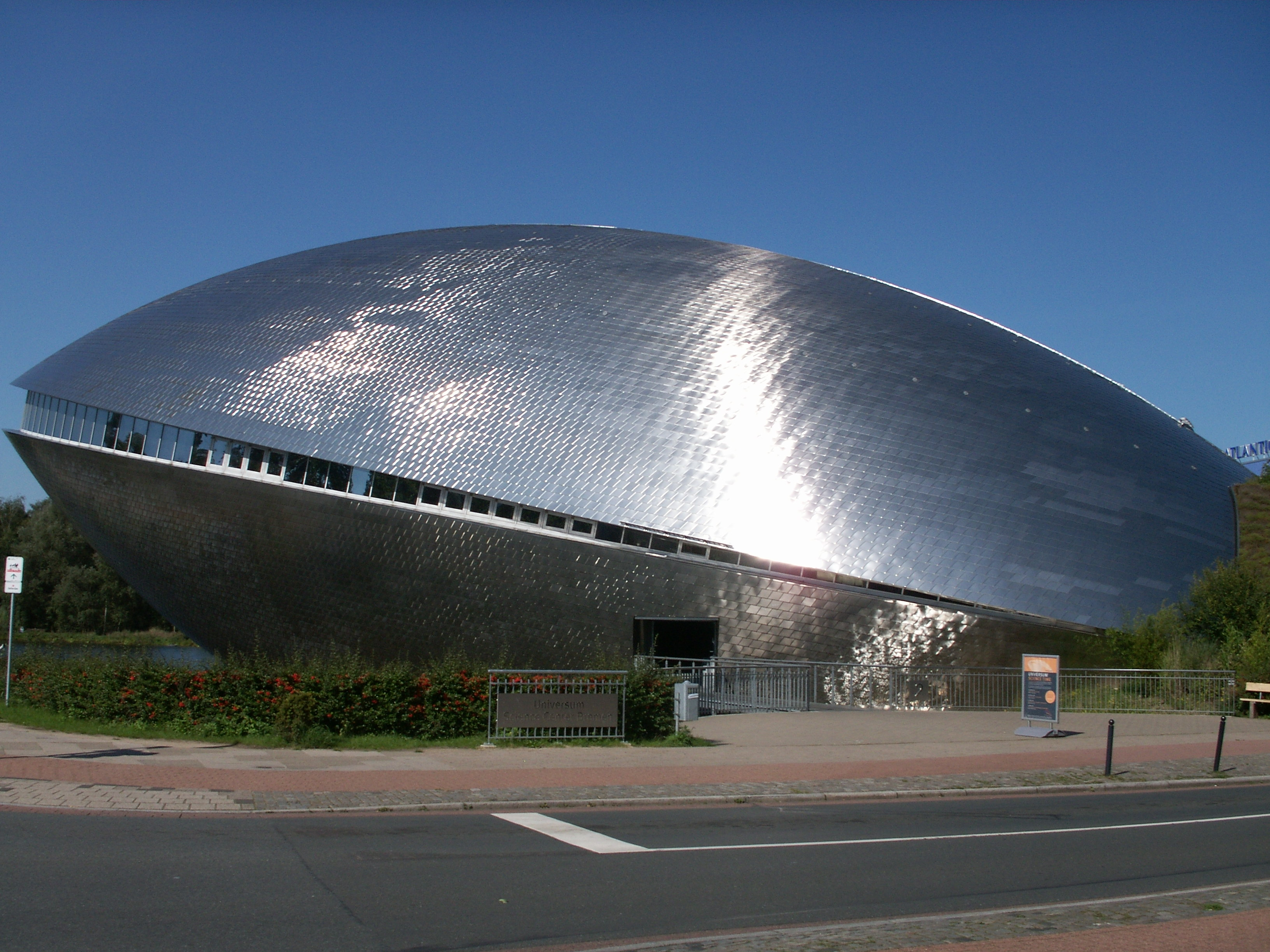
The Universum Bremen, a Science Center in Bremen.

Universum Science Center, Bremen

The Universum Bremen is a science museum in Bremen, Germany. Visitors are encouraged to interact with most of the approximately 250 exhibits. It receives on average 450,000 visitors annually.

== History ==
The Universum Bremen opened in September 2000 near to the University of Bremen, Germany. Covering over 4,000 m^{2} the exhibition contains exhibits related to one of the three topics: mankind, earth and the cosmos. The science center building, with its 40,000 stainless steel scales, resembles a mixture between a whale and mussel. It was designed by the Bremen architect Thomas Klumpp.

The company Universum Managementges. mbH runs the science center as a private enterprise. About 3.4 million people visited the Universum in the first seven years since it opened.

In 2007 the Universum opened a large outdoor area, the EntdeckerPark, and a new building, the SchauBox. In contrast to the curved metallic older building, the SchauBox, developed by Haslob Kruse and Partner, is cubic with a rust-red exterior. It is used for additional exhibitions, which change annually.

The EntdeckerPark, the 5,000 m^{2} outdoor area developed by Planungsguppe Grün, offers a number of hands-on exhibits, landscape elements and a 27m-high tower, called the Turm der Lüfte.

The concept of the exhibits and the interior design were realized by Kunstraum GfK mbH, Hamburg and Archimedia, Stuttgart.
