= Coat of arms of Bremen =

Coat of arms of the German state of Bremen

Versions
- Middle coat of arms of Bremen

- Lesser arms of Bremen

- Coat of arms used in the state flag
- Armiger: Free Hanseatic City of Bremen
- Crest: A leaf coronet of five.
- Shield: Gules, a key Argent
- Supporters: Two lions rampant reguardant Or, langued Gules
- Compartment: A postament Or

The Free Hanseatic City of Bremen is a state, and Bremen is a city, in Germany.

== Description ==
The coat of arms of the Free Hanseatic City of Bremen shows a silver key on a red shield. The key is the attribute of Simon Petrus, patron saint of the Bremen Cathedral, and it was first represented in the seal of the City of Bremen in 1366, after its liberation from the occupation by Prince-Archbishop Albert II, and later became the main element of the city's coat-of-arms.

== History ==
Bremen's red and white colors derive from the colors of the Hanseatic League. Starting in the 16th century, the shield was supported by angels, but from 1568, however, they were replaced by lions. In 1617 a helmet was added, but it was never officially part of the coat of arms. The crown on the coat of arms dates from the late 16th century.

Bremen's coat of arms during the French occupation

In 1811, Napoleon Bonaparte added three bees to the coat of arms. The bees were used to claim that the Napoleonic Empire had Frankish heritage. Representations of bees were 1653 in the grave of Childeric I. They are meant to act as a symbol of France's ideals on immortality and rebirth. Napoleon also changed the colors of the coat of arms to the red and gold of his family, this being the only time Bremen used a coat of arms not featuring the historical colors of Bremen, red and white.

After the Napoleonic era, Bremen's previous coat of arms, a silver key on red, were restored.

== See also ==
- Flag of Bremen
- Coat of arms of Germany
- Origin of the coats of arms of German federal states.
