= Gleistein =

German cordage company

Geo. Gleistein & Sohn GmbH
- Company type: Private
- Founded: 1824
- Founder: Georg Gleistein
- Headquarters: Bremen, Bremen-Nord, Germany
- Area served: Worldwide
- Key people: Klaus Walther; Thomas Schlätzer
- Products: Ropes, Cordage
- Operating income: 21 Mio.
- Owner: Family
- Number of employees: 240
- Divisions: Gleistein Slovakia s.r.o. Gleistein Ropes Ltd. (UK)
- Website: http://www.gleistein.com/en/

Gleistein is a prominent German cordage factory with head office in Bremen. To the group of companies belong the Gleistein Slovakia s.r.o. in Trencin and Gleistein Ropes Ltd. in Great Britain. According to own data Gleistein has about 240 employees and 21million euro conversion are obtained.

== History ==
Founded in 1824 by sailor captain Georg Gleistein as well as his oldest son Johann, Georg Gleistein & son started out with 12 workers converting natural fibers (hemp, tow) manually into ropes. Equipped were freight- and riverboats, shipping companies and farmers.

Arising new fibers such as Sisal and Manila opened new technical possibilities. Starting from 1890 on, the Herkulestauwerk (lit. Hercules cordage) was used for dragging nets for fishing. At that time Bremen-Vegesack, the former company headquarters, was the port of registry of Europe's biggest herring fleet. Starting from 1920 basic researches for standardisation and computation of ropes were established. In the year 1947, the first ropes made of chemical fibres were produced. 1978, the enterprise shifts its head office to Bremen-Blumenthal. 1997, a production is set up in Slovakia, 1999 the enterprise existed 175 years. In his hometown Vegesack (part of Bremen today), the Georg-Gleistein-Strasse wears the founder's name.

== Products ==
- Gleistein supplied the ropes for the Reichstagsverhüllung (the wrapping of the Reichstag in Berlin) in 1995 performed by the artists Christo and Jeanne-Claude
- Exclusive cordage supplier for Arved Fuchs for many years on all expeditions with his boat Dagmar Aaen in the polar seas.
- Exclusive cordage supplier for racing yachts as the illbruck, winner of the Volvo Ocean Race in 2001/2002, as well as for the participant in the America’s Cup 2007, BMW Oracle Racing
- Official Rope Supplier for PUMA Ocean Racing for the Volvo Ocean Race 2008-2009
- Rope supplier for Francis Joyon with his world record in single-handed non-stop circumnavigation
- Development partner for rope for the course kite drive of ships (Skysail)
- Gleistein self-publishes the German standard Spleißbuch (Splicebook) for expert rope splicing
