= Bremen =

City in Germany

Bremen Breem / Bräm (Low German)
- City
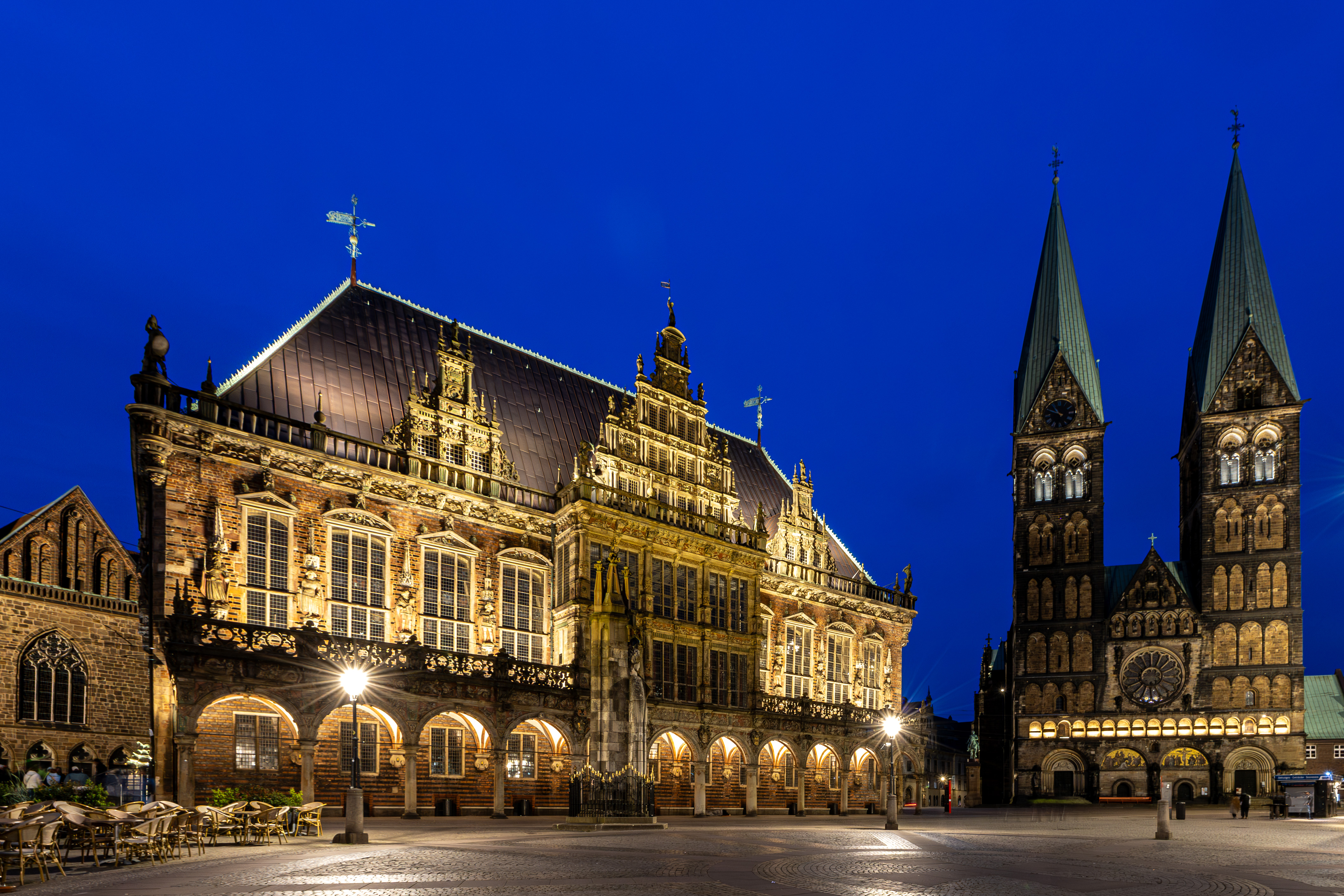
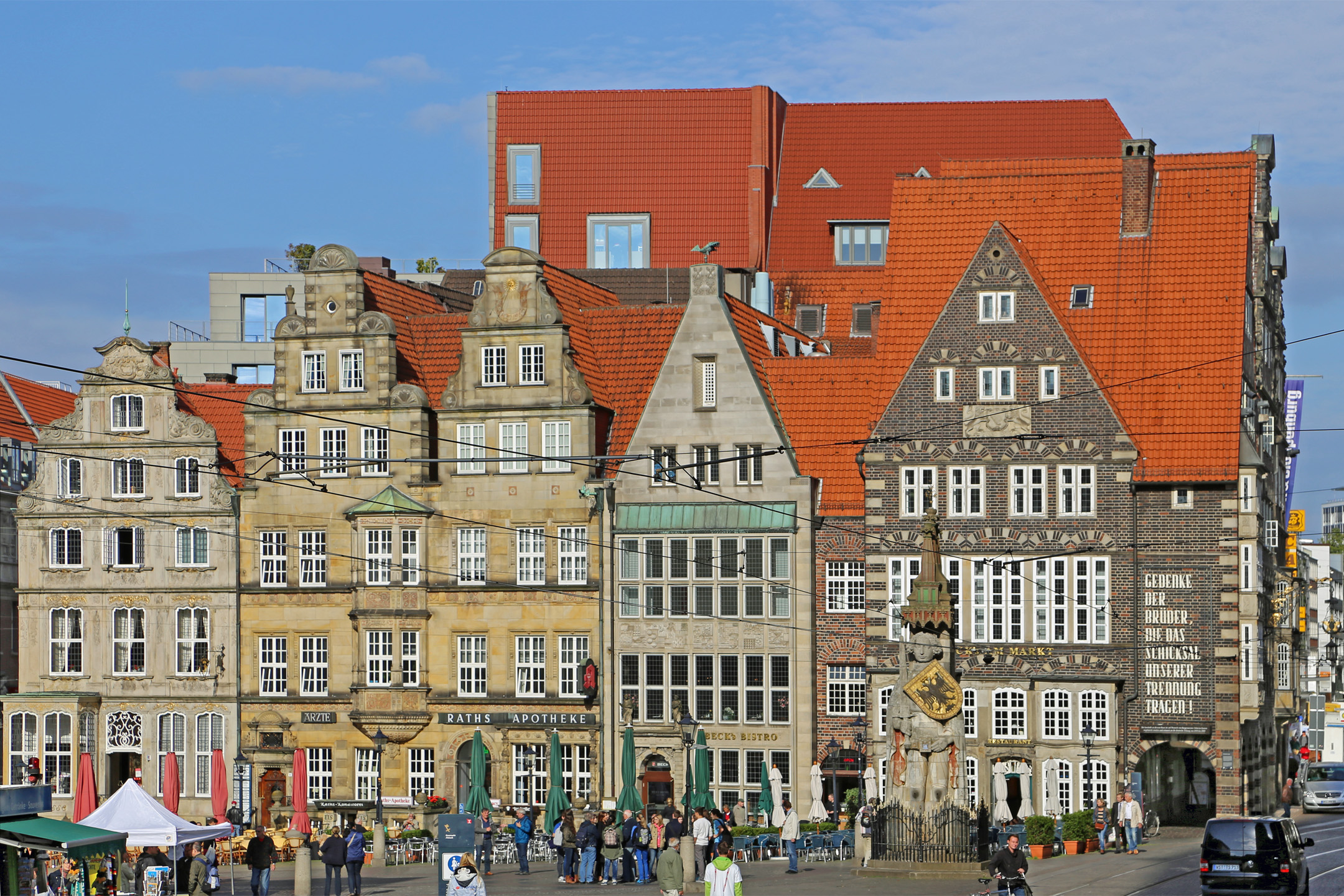
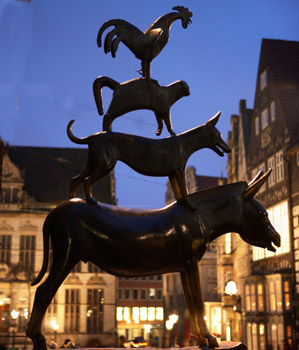
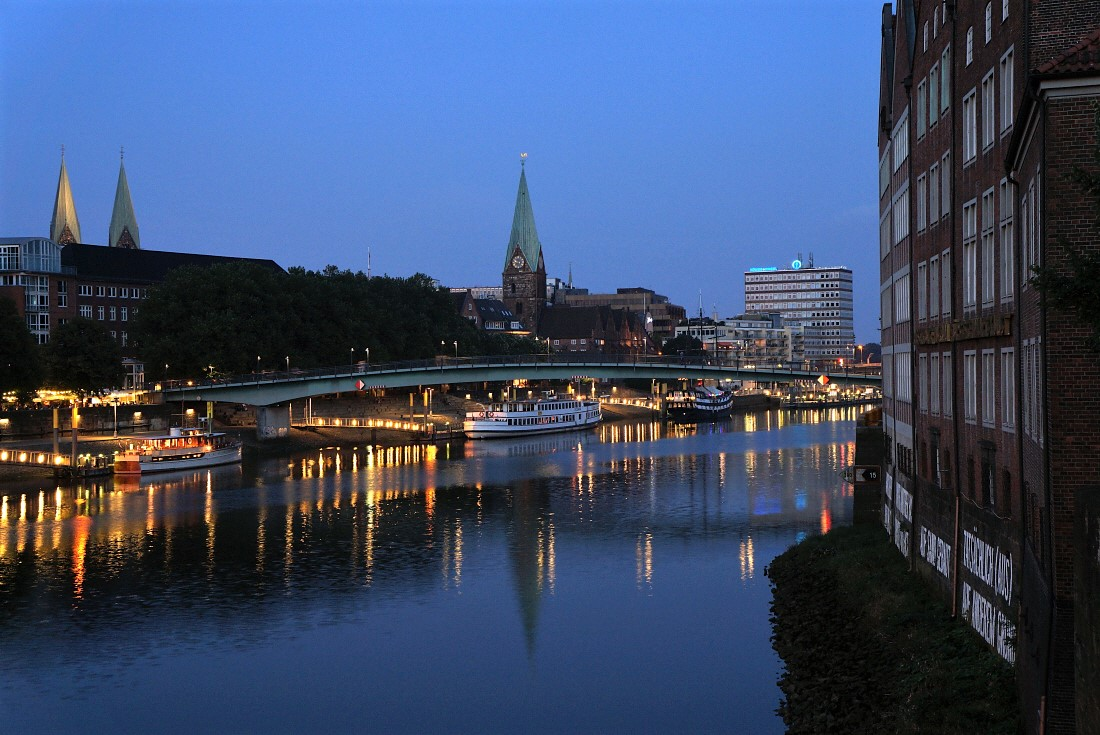
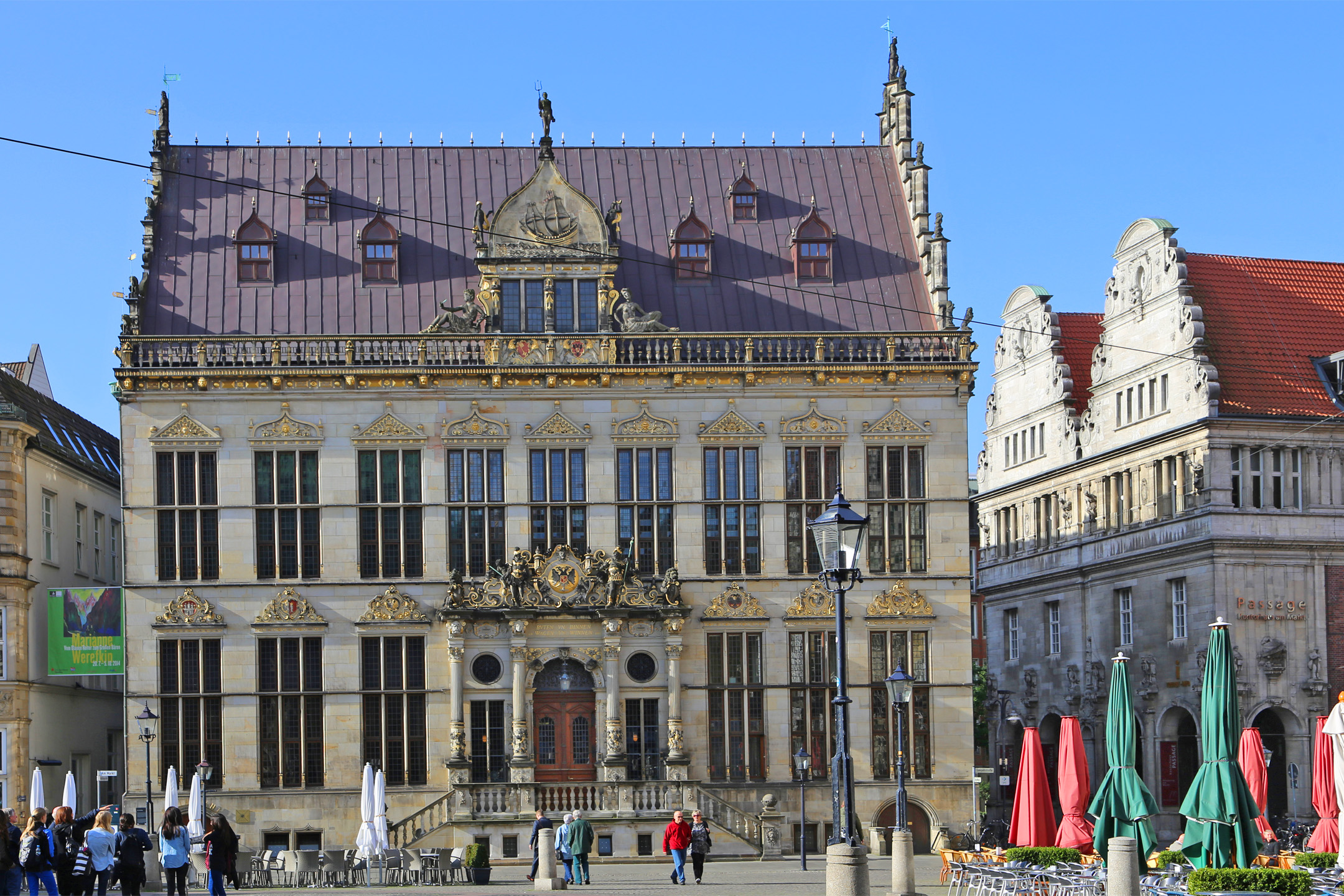
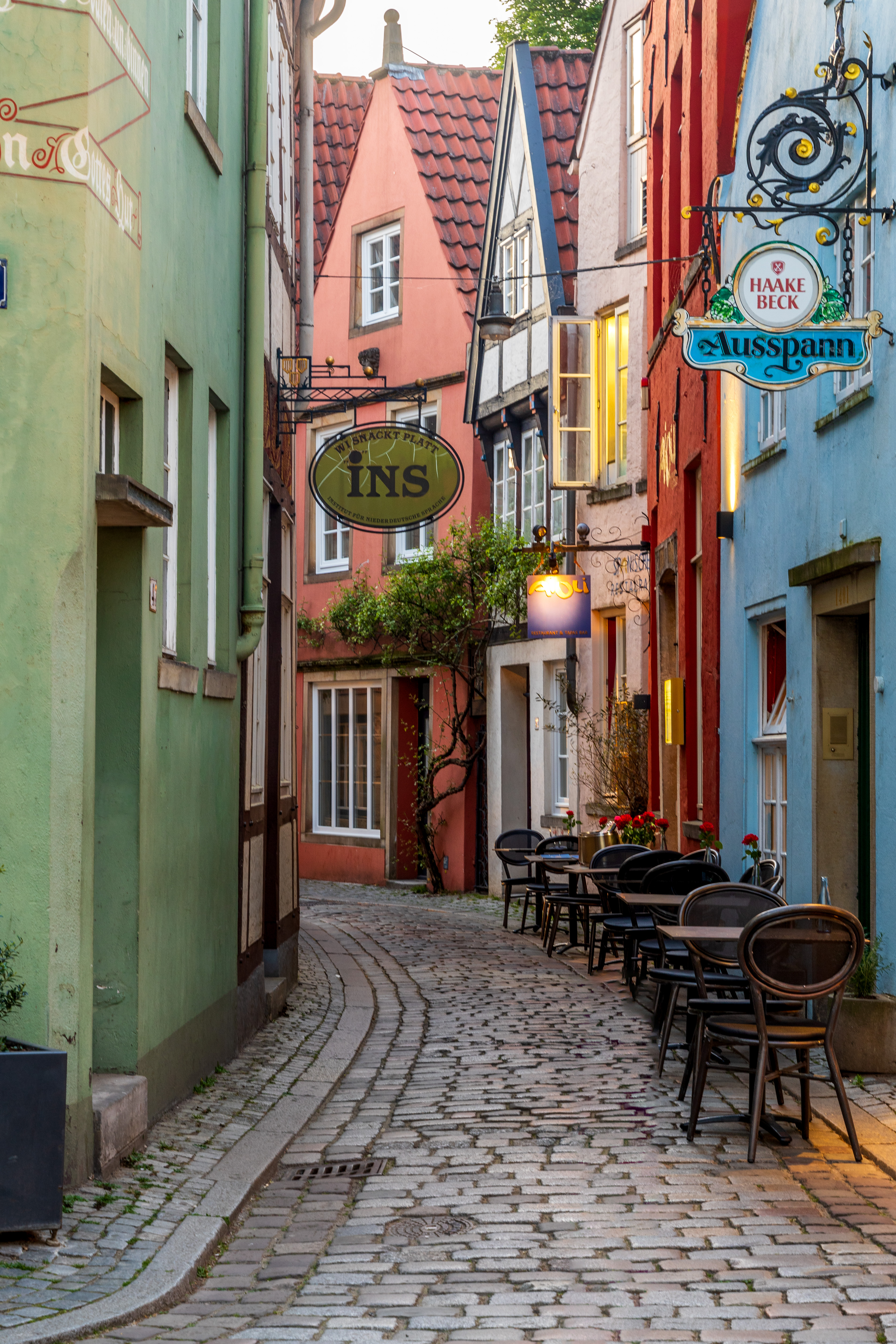
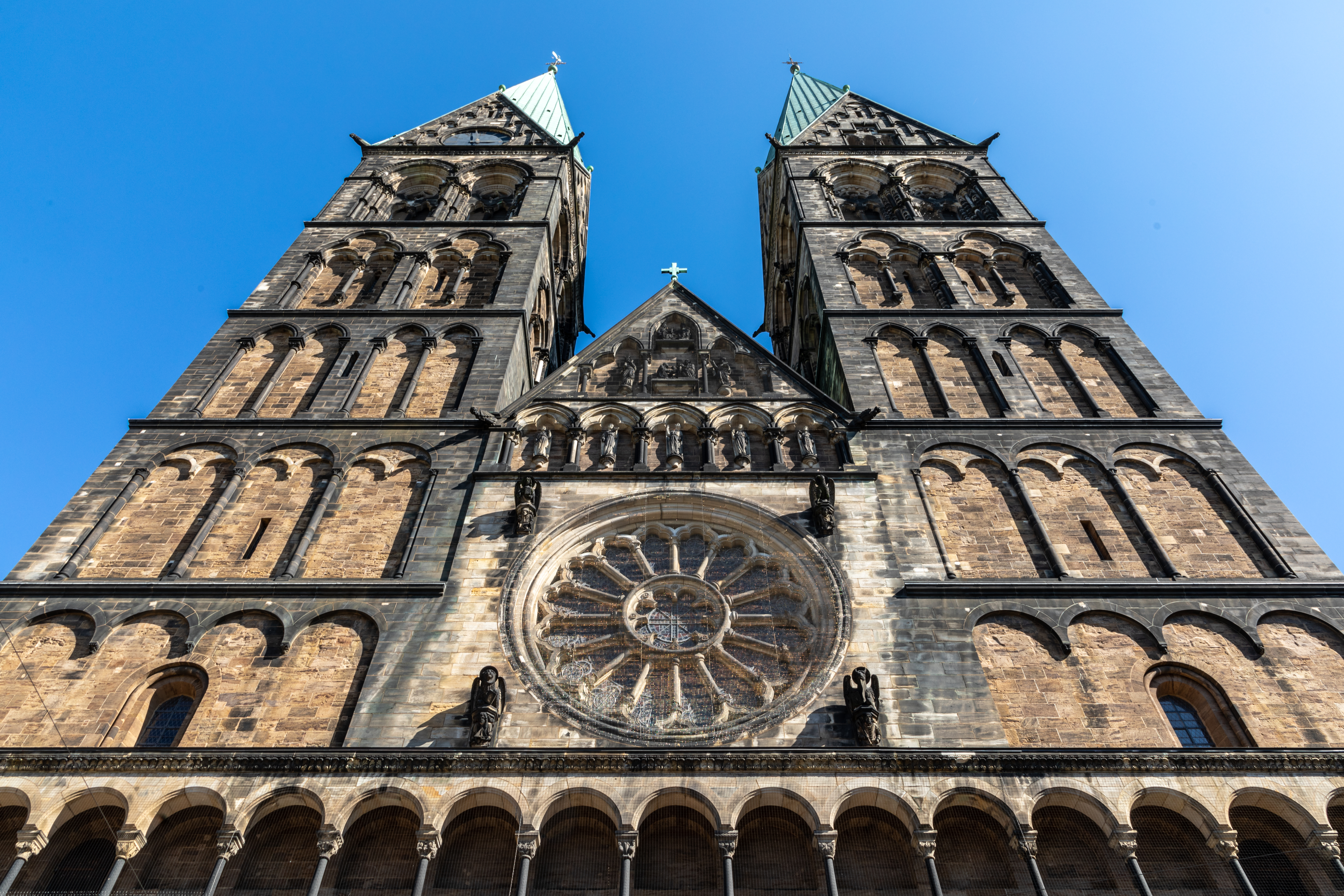
- City Hall and Cathedral Bremer Marktplatz Town Musicians Weser River Schütting Schnoor Bremen Cathedral

- Flag Coat of arms
- Interactive map of Bremen
- Location within Germany Location within Bremen
- Coordinates: 53°04′33″N 08°48′26″E
- Country: Germany
- State: Bremen
- Subdivisions: 5 boroughs, 19 districts, 88 subdistricts

Government
  - Mayor: Andreas Bovenschulte (SPD)
  - Governing parties: SPD/ Greens/ Left

Area
  - City: 326.73 km^{2} (126.15 sq mi)
  - Metro: 11,627 km^{2} (4,489 sq mi)
- Elevation: 12 m (39 ft)

Population (2025-12-31)
  - City: 588,413
  - Density: 1,800.9/km^{2} (4,664.3/sq mi)
  - Metro: 2,800,000
- Demonym(s): Bremer (m), Bremerin (f)
- Time zone: UTC+01:00 (CET)
  - Summer (DST): UTC+02:00 (CEST)
- Postal codes: 28001–28779
- Dialling codes: 0421
- Vehicle registration: HB (with 1 to 2 letters and 1 to 4 digits)
- Website: Bremen online

Bremen (German: [ˈbʁeːmən]), (Note: Low German: Breem or Bräm) officially the City Municipality of Bremen, (Note: German: Stadtgemeinde Bremen, pronounced [ˈʃtatɡəˌmaɪndə ˈbʁeːmən]) is the capital and most populous city of the German state of the Free Hanseatic City of Bremen (Freie Hansestadt Bremen), a two-city-state consisting of the city of Bremen itself, and Bremerhaven. An important port city with about 586,000 inhabitants, this Hanseatic city is the 11th-largest city of Germany and the second-largest city in Northern Germany after Hamburg. (Note: Berlin is considered part of Eastern Germany.)

Bremen is the largest city on the River Weser, the longest river flowing entirely in Germany, lying some 60 km (37 mi) upstream from its mouth into the North Sea at Bremerhaven, and is completely surrounded by the state of Lower Saxony. Bremen is the centre of the Northwest Metropolitan Region, which also includes the cities of Oldenburg and Bremerhaven, and has a population of around 2.8 million people. Bremen is contiguous with the Lower Saxon towns of Delmenhorst, Stuhr, Achim, Weyhe, Schwanewede and Lilienthal. There is an exclave of Bremen in Bremerhaven, the "City of Bremen Overseas Port Area Bremerhaven" (Stadtbremisches Überseehafengebiet Bremerhaven). Bremen is the third-largest city in the Low German dialect area after Hamburg and Dortmund.

The city traces its origins to a settlement in the early Middle Ages and became the seat of a bishopric in 787. During the High Middle Ages, Bremen grew into a flourishing trading centre and joined the Hanseatic League in the 13th century, establishing commercial links across Northern Europe. Its autonomy as a free imperial city was recognised within the Holy Roman Empire, and despite periods of conflict, Bremen retained a strong civic identity. In later centuries, the city developed into a key hub for shipping and overseas trade, contributing to Germany's maritime economy.

Bremen is a major cultural and economic hub of Northern Germany. The city hosts a variety of galleries and museums, ranging from historical sculptures to major art museums, such as the Bremen Overseas Museum or the Weserburg. The Bremen City Hall and the Bremen Roland form the UNESCO World Heritage Site "Town Hall and Roland on the Marketplace of Bremen". In 2023, Bremen was named a UNESCO City of Literature, joining UNESCO's Creative Cities Network. The city is well-known through the Brothers Grimm's fairy tale "Town Musicians of Bremen", and there is a statue dedicated to it in front of the city hall. Bremen's port, together with the port of Bremerhaven at the mouth of the Weser, is the second-largest port in Germany after the Port of Hamburg. Bremen Airport lies in the southern borough of Neustadt-Neuenland and is Germany's 12th-busiest airport.

== History ==
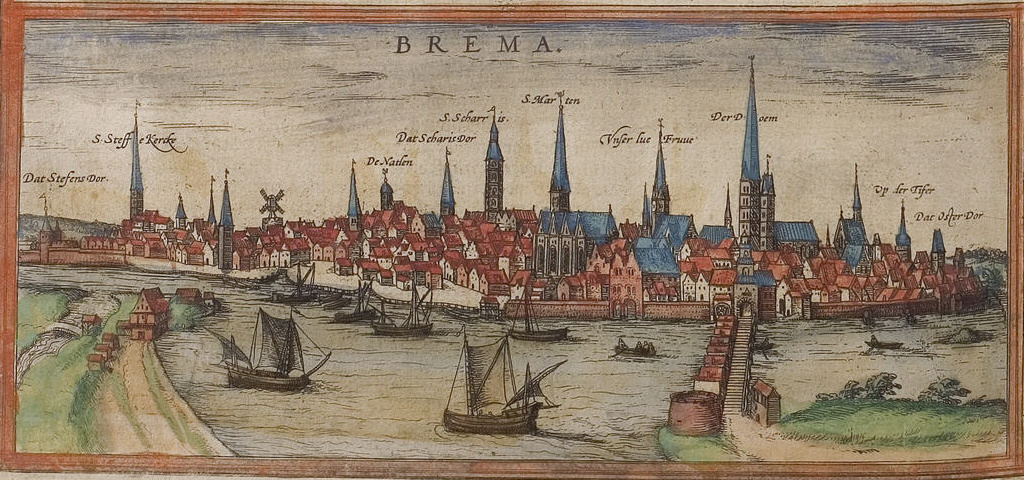
16th century view of the city

For most of its 1,200 year history, Bremen was an independent city within the confederal jurisdiction of the Holy Roman Empire. Its governing merchants and guilds were at the centre of the Hanseatic League that sought to monopolise the North Sea and Baltic Sea trade. To enlarge and confirm its independence, the city had, until the Reformation, to contend with the temporal power of the Church, and after the Thirty Years' War with Sweden, the masters of the surrounding Duchy of Bremen-Verden. George I Louis, the Elector of Hannover (and from 1714, King of Great Britain and Ireland) who in 1715 acquired Bremen-Verden, recognised Bremen as a free city in 1720. The city was captured in 1806 and then annexed by France in 1810, before it regained independence in 1815.

In the late nineteenth century, Bremen was drawn by Prussia into the German Empire. With its new sea anchorage and wharves at Bremerhaven, it was the principal port of embarkation for German and central European emigrants to the Americas, and an entrepôt for Germany's late developing colonial trade. The Norddeutscher Lloyd (NDL), founded in Bremen in 1857, became one of the world's leading shipping companies.

After the First World War, Bremen, a broadly liberal and social-democratic city, and briefly a Soviet republic, lost its autonomy under the Hitler regime. After World War II, in which almost two thirds of the city's fabric was destroyed, the autonomy was restored. Bremen became one of the founding states (Länder) of the Federal Republic (West Germany).

== Geography ==
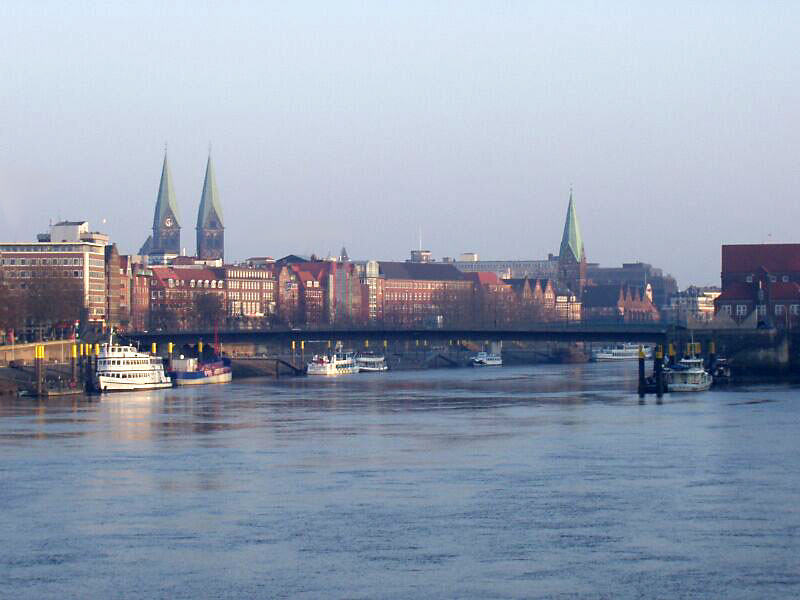
View from the Stephanibrücke towards the city centre and cathedral

Bremen lies on both sides of the River Weser, about 60 kilometres (37 miles) upstream of its estuary on the North Sea and its transition to the Outer Weser by Bremerhaven. Opposite Bremen's Altstadt is the point where the "Middle Weser" becomes the "Lower Weser" and, from the area of Bremen's port, the river has been made navigable to ocean-going vessels. The region on the left bank of the Lower Weser, through which the Ochtum flows, is the Weser Marshes, the landscape on its right bank is part of the Elbe-Weser Triangle. The Lesum, and its tributaries, the Wümme and Hamme, the Schönebecker Aue and Blumenthaler Aue, are the downstream tributaries of the Weser.

The city's municipal area is about 38 kilometres (24 miles) long and 16 kilometres (10 miles) wide. In terms of area, Bremen is the eleventh largest city in Germany; and in terms of population the second largest city in northwest Germany after Hamburg and the eleventh largest in the whole of Germany (see: List of cities in Germany by population).

Bremen lies about 50 kilometres (31 miles) east of the city of Oldenburg, 110 kilometres (68 miles) southwest of Hamburg, 120 kilometres (75 miles) northwest of Hanover, 100 kilometres (62 miles) north of Minden and 105 kilometres (65 miles) northeast of Osnabrück. Part of Bremerhaven's port territory forms an exclave of the City of Bremen.

=== Hills of Bremen ===
The inner city lies on a Weser dune, which reaches a natural height of 10.5 metres (34 feet, 6 inches) above sea level at Bremen Cathedral; its highest point, though, is 14.4 metres (47 feet, 3 inches) above sea level and lies to the east at the Polizeihaus, Am Wall 196. The highest natural feature in the city of Bremen is 32.5 metres (107 feet) above sea level and lies in Friedehorst Park in the northwestern borough of Burglesum. As a result, Bremen has the lowest high point of all the German states.

=== Climate ===
Bremen has a moderate oceanic climate (Köppen climate classification Cfb) due to its proximity to the North Sea coast and temperate maritime air masses that move in with the predominantly westerly winds from the Atlantic Ocean. However, periods in which continental air masses predominate may occur at any time of the year and can lead to heat waves in the summer and prolonged periods of frost in the winter. In general though, extremes are rare in Bremen and temperatures below −15 °C (5.0 °F) and above 35 °C (95.0 °F) occur only once every couple of years. The record high temperature was 37.6 °C (99.7 °F) on 9 August 1992, while the official record low temperature was −23.6 °C (−10.5 °F) on 13 February 1940. On 13 October 2018, Bremen recorded its warmest October day on record with 28.6 °C (83.4 °F). However, the astronomer Heinrich Wilhelm Matthias Olbers reported to have measured −27.3 °C on 23 January 1823. Being at some distance from the main North Sea, Bremen still has a somewhat wider temperature range than Bremerhaven that is located on the mouth of the Weser.

Average temperatures have risen continually over the last decades, leading to a 1.0 °C (1.8 °F) rise in the mean annual temperature between 1961–90 and 1991–2020 reference periods. As in most parts of Germany, the year 2024 has been the warmest year on record averaging 11.4 °C (52.5 °F), making Bremen the second-warmest German state after Berlin. While Bremen is located in the comparatively cloudy northwestern part of Germany, there has been a significant increase in average sunshine hours over the last decades, especially in the months of April, May, and July, causing the annual mean to rise by 121 hours between the reference periods of 1961–90 and 1991–2020. This trend has continued over the last 10 years (2016–2025), which average ca. 1760 hours of sunshine, almost 300 hours more than in the international reference period of 1961–90. Nevertheless, especially the winters remain extremely gloomy by international standards with December averaging hardly more than one hour of sunshine (out of 7 astronomically possible) per day, a feature that Bremen shares with most of Germany and its neighbouring countries, though.

Precipitation is distributed fairly evenly around the year with a small peak in summer mainly due to convective precipitation, i.e. showers and thunderstorms. Snowfall and the period of snow cover are variable; whereas in some years, hardly any snow accumulation occurs, there has recently been a series of unusually snowy winters, peaking in the record year 2010 counting 84 days with a snow cover. Nevertheless, snow accumulation of more than 20 centimetres (8 in) remains exceptional, the record being 68 centimetres (26.8 in) of snow on 18 February 1979.

The warmest months in Bremen are June, July, and August, with average high temperatures of 20.2 to 22.6 °C (68.4 to 72.7 °F). The coldest are December, January, and February, with average low temperatures of −1.1 to 0.3 °C (30.0 to 32.5 °F). Typical of its maritime location, autumn tends to remain mild well into October, while spring arrives later than in the southwestern parts of the country.

Climate data for Bremen (1991–2020 normals)
Month	Jan	Feb	Mar	Apr	May	Jun	Jul	Aug	Sep	Oct	Nov	Dec	Year
Record high °C (°F)	14.6 (58.3)	18.5 (65.3)	23.5 (74.3)	30.2 (86.4)	34.4 (93.9)	34.9 (94.8)	36.8 (98.2)	37.6 (99.7)	33.4 (92.1)	28.6 (83.5)	20.1 (68.2)	16.1 (61.0)	37.6 (99.7)
Mean maximum °C (°F)	11.3 (52.3)	12.3 (54.1)	17.2 (63.0)	22.4 (72.3)	26.4 (79.5)	29.8 (85.6)	31.4 (88.5)	31.5 (88.7)	25.9 (78.6)	20.5 (68.9)	15.6 (60.1)	11.9 (53.4)	33.4 (92.1)
Mean daily maximum °C (°F)	4.6 (40.3)	5.6 (42.1)	9.3 (48.7)	14.5 (58.1)	18.3 (64.9)	21.3 (70.3)	23.6 (74.5)	23.3 (73.9)	19.3 (66.7)	14.0 (57.2)	8.6 (47.5)	5.4 (41.7)	14.0 (57.2)
Daily mean °C (°F)	2.2 (36.0)	2.6 (36.7)	5.2 (41.4)	9.4 (48.9)	13.2 (55.8)	16.2 (61.2)	18.4 (65.1)	18.0 (64.4)	14.3 (57.7)	10.0 (50.0)	5.8 (42.4)	3.1 (37.6)	9.9 (49.8)
Mean daily minimum °C (°F)	−0.5 (31.1)	−0.5 (31.1)	1.1 (34.0)	3.9 (39.0)	7.5 (45.5)	10.5 (50.9)	12.9 (55.2)	12.6 (54.7)	9.6 (49.3)	6.0 (42.8)	2.8 (37.0)	0.5 (32.9)	5.5 (41.9)
Mean minimum °C (°F)	−8.8 (16.2)	−7.9 (17.8)	−5.1 (22.8)	−2.8 (27.0)	0.5 (32.9)	4.8 (40.6)	7.6 (45.7)	7.0 (44.6)	3.4 (38.1)	−0.9 (30.4)	−4.3 (24.3)	−7.5 (18.5)	−11.4 (11.5)
Record low °C (°F)	−21.8 (−7.2)	−23.6 (−10.5)	−18.7 (−1.7)	−7.6 (18.3)	−3.5 (25.7)	0.5 (32.9)	3.0 (37.4)	3.4 (38.1)	−1.2 (29.8)	−7.8 (18.0)	−14.1 (6.6)	−17.5 (0.5)	−23.6 (−10.5)
Average precipitation mm (inches)	58.4 (2.30)	43.6 (1.72)	45.6 (1.80)	39.5 (1.56)	49.8 (1.96)	62.3 (2.45)	75.3 (2.96)	69.3 (2.73)	58.3 (2.30)	57.1 (2.25)	51.2 (2.02)	59.9 (2.36)	670.3 (26.39)
Average precipitation days (≥ 0.1 mm)	18.1	15.0	15.1	12.8	13.9	14.5	15.5	15.5	13.9	15.8	17.0	18.2	185.4
Average snowy days (≥ 1.0 cm)	1.4	1.2	0.5	0	0	0	0	0	0	0	0.2	0.9	1.6
Average relative humidity (%)	86.9	83.7	78.9	72.4	71.5	73.0	73.4	75.2	80.4	85.0	88.5	88.7	79.8
Mean monthly sunshine hours	47.8	69.8	120.4	182.0	213.2	204.8	213.5	198.0	151.2	109.8	53.3	40.2	1,604
Source 1: NOAA
Source 2: DWD; wetterkontor.de; Infoclimat

== Population ==
Historical population
Year	Pop.	±%
1350	10,000	—
1650	25,000	+150.0%
1811	36,630	+46.5%
1852	57,055	+55.8%
1864	70,692	+23.9%
1871	82,969	+17.4%
1890	125,684	+51.5%
1900	161,184	+28.2%
1910	247,437	+53.5%
1919		—
1925	295,585	—
1933	324,189	+9.7%
1939	431,800	+33.2%
1945	366,427	−15.1%
1951	463,049	+26.4%
1961	569,862	+23.1%
1971	594,591	+4.3%
1981	553,261	−7.0%
1991	551,219	−0.4%
2001	540,950	−1.9%
2011	542,707	+0.3%
2022	575,071	+6.0%
Population size may be affected by changes in administrative divisions.

Bremen's economy boomed in line with the West German Wirtschaftswunder of the 1950s and 60s. This saw the growth, and permanent settlement, of a large migrant worker population, drawn largely from Turkey and southern Europe. A new wave of immigration occurred after the turn of new century, following the entry of Poland, Bulgaria and other former East Bloc countries into the European Union, and after 2015 with the settlement of refugees from Syria and other war-torn regions. Today Bremen has a population of 567,000 and is the 11th largest city in Germany and 5th largest city by area with area of 318.21 km^{2} (122.86 sq mi), which makes this city area bigger than Munich.

By the second decade of the century out of a population (including Bremerhaven) of approximately 680,000, over 115,000 had foreign citizenship, and nearly twice that number, almost a third of the total population, could be classified as having non-German origin/ethnicity.

Number of minorities in Bremen by nationality as of 31 December 2024:

Rank	Nationality	Population (2024)
1	Turkey	23,765
2	Syria	18,805
3	Ukraine	12,905
4	Bulgaria	9,290
5	Poland	8,925
6	Afghanistan	5,410
7	Russia	4,385
8	Romania	4,120
9	Ghana	3,965
10	Serbia	3,940
11	Nigeria	2,820
12	Iran	2,750
13	Portugal	2,430
14	Italy	2,375
15	Kosovo	2,285

The recent influx has somewhat moderated the tendency toward an accelerated ageing of the population. As it is, more than half the population of the state of Bremen are over 40, and more than a quarter are over 60.

== Politics ==
The Stadtbürgerschaft (municipal assembly) is currently made up of 72 of the 87 legislators of the state legislature, the Bremische Bürgerschaft who reside in the city of Bremen. The legislature is elected by the citizens of Bremen every four years.

Parliament building at the Market square

Bremen has a reputation as a left-wing city. The port, shipyards and related industries sustained a large and unionised working class. This translated into support for the Social Democrats, considered Bremen's natural governing party. However, in the 1980s mechanization of the port and closure of the city's leading shipbuilder induced an employment crisis and shook the confidence of the party's traditional voter base. The SPD, which had still polled 51% in 1987, lost its effective majority. The once dominant left-liberal vote split, and coalition government became the norm. The state today is governed by a coalition of the Social Democratic Party, The Greens and The Left.

In November 2019 the right-wing group Phalanx 18 was banned by the city-state of Bremen.

One of the two mayors (Bürgermeister) is elected President of the Senate (Präsident des Senats) and serves as head of the city and the state. The current mayor is Andreas Bovenschulte.

=== Last state election, 2023 ===
Party	Votes	%	Swing	Seats		Total seats	Change
Party	Votes	%	Swing	Bremen	Bremerhaven	Total seats	Change
Social Democratic Party (SPD)	376,610	29.8	▲4.9	23	4	27	▲4
Christian Democratic Union (CDU)	331,380	26.2	▼0.4	21	3	24	0
Alliance 90/The Greens (GRÜNE)	150,263	11.9	▼5.5	9	2	11	▼5
The Left (DIE LINKE)	137,676	10.9	▼0.4	9	1	10	0
Citizens in Rage (BiW)	118,695	9.4	▲7.0	6	4	10	▲9
Free Democratic Party (FDP)	64,155	5.1	▼0.9	4	1	5	0
Volt Germany (Volt)	24,828	2.0	New	0	–	0	New
Human Environment Animal Protection Party	13,819	1.1	New	0	–	0	New
Die PARTEI	12,052	1.0	▼0.7	0	–	0	0
Grassroots Democratic Party (dieBasis)	9,988	0.8	New	0	–	0	New
MERA25	7,912	0.6	New	0	–	0	New
Ecological Democratic Party (ÖDP)	5,498	0.4	New	0	0	0	New
Basic Income for All (GFA)	5,351	0.4	New	0	–	0	New
Pirate Party Germany (Piraten)	2,184	0.2	▼0.8	–	0	0	0
Marxist–Leninist Party of Germany (MLPD)	1,993	0.2	New	0	–	0	New
Party for Biomedical Rejuvenation Research	1,484	0.1	New	0	–	0	New
Total	1,263,908	100.0		72	15	87	▲3
Invalid	6,698	2.6	▲0.3				
Turnout	262,099	56.9	▼7.2				
Registered voters	460,778						
Source: Wahlen Bremen

=== Administrative structure ===
Stadtbezirk (borough)	Stadtteile (urban districts), Ortsteile (subdistricts, selectively)	Area	Population	Density of population	Maps	
Mitte (Central); 1	Mitte (Central); Altstadt (Old city), incl. Schnoor; Ostertor, part of Viertel (Bremen); Häfen (Ports)	33.741 km²	17,392	515 / km²	Mitte	Häfen
Süd (South); 2	Neustadt (New Town); Alte Neustadt (Old New Town, near the Weser, opposite of the City); Buntentor (an old suburb, southeast of Alte Neustadt); Huckelriede, between Buntentor and Habenhausen; Hohentor, west of Alte Neustadt; Neuenland, with Bremen Airport and some hightech companies; Neustadt, Südervorstadt and Gartenstadt Süd between Alte Neustadt and the airport city: Obervieland; Arsten (near Weser river, upstream); Habenhausen (near Weser, north of Arsten); Kattenesch (west of Arsten); Kattenturm (northwestern section); Huchting, mainly west of river Ochtum; Woltmershausen with Rablinghausen, between Weser river and Neustädter Hafen; Seehausen, a village near river Weser; Strom, a village	66.637 km²	123,303	1,850 / km²	Neustadt Huchting Seehausen	Obervieland Woltmershausen Strom
Ost (East); 3	Östliche Vorstadt (Eastern Suburb); Steintor (near the city), part of Viertel (Bremen); Fesenfeld (northern part of Steintor); Peterswerder (with Weserstadion); Hulsberg (north of Peterswerder); Schwachhausen; Vahr (with Aalto-Hochhaus); Horn-Lehe (with University of Bremen); Borgfeld; Oberneuland; Osterholz; Hemelingen; Hastedt (near Östliche Vorstadt); Sebaldsbrück (east of Hastedt); Hemelingen (south of Sebaldsbrück, near Weser river); Arbergen (east of Hemelingen); Mahndorf (east of Arbergen)	108.201 km²	218,843	2,023 / km²	Östliche Vorstadt Vahr Borgfeld Osterholz	Schwachhausen Horn-Lehe Oberneuland Hemelingen
West; 4	Blockland; Findorff; Walle; Gröpelingen; Oslebshausen	56.606 km²	89,216	1,576 / km²	Blockland Findorff	Walle Gröpelingen
Nord (North); 5	Burglesum; Vegesack; Blumenthal; Rönnebeck; Farge; Rekum (with Valentin submarine pens)	60.376 km²	98,606	1,633 / km²	Burglesum Blumenthal	Vegesack

== Main sights ==
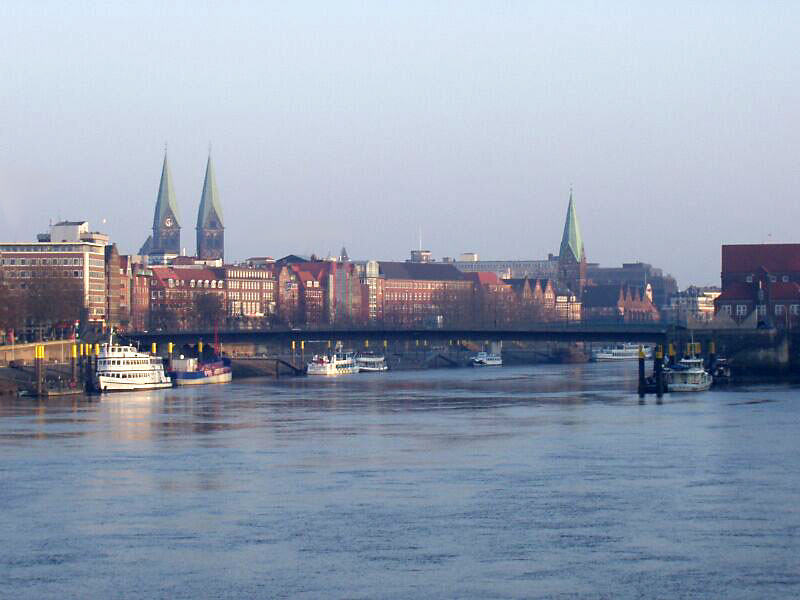
View from the Stephani-Bridge in the direction of the Cathedral

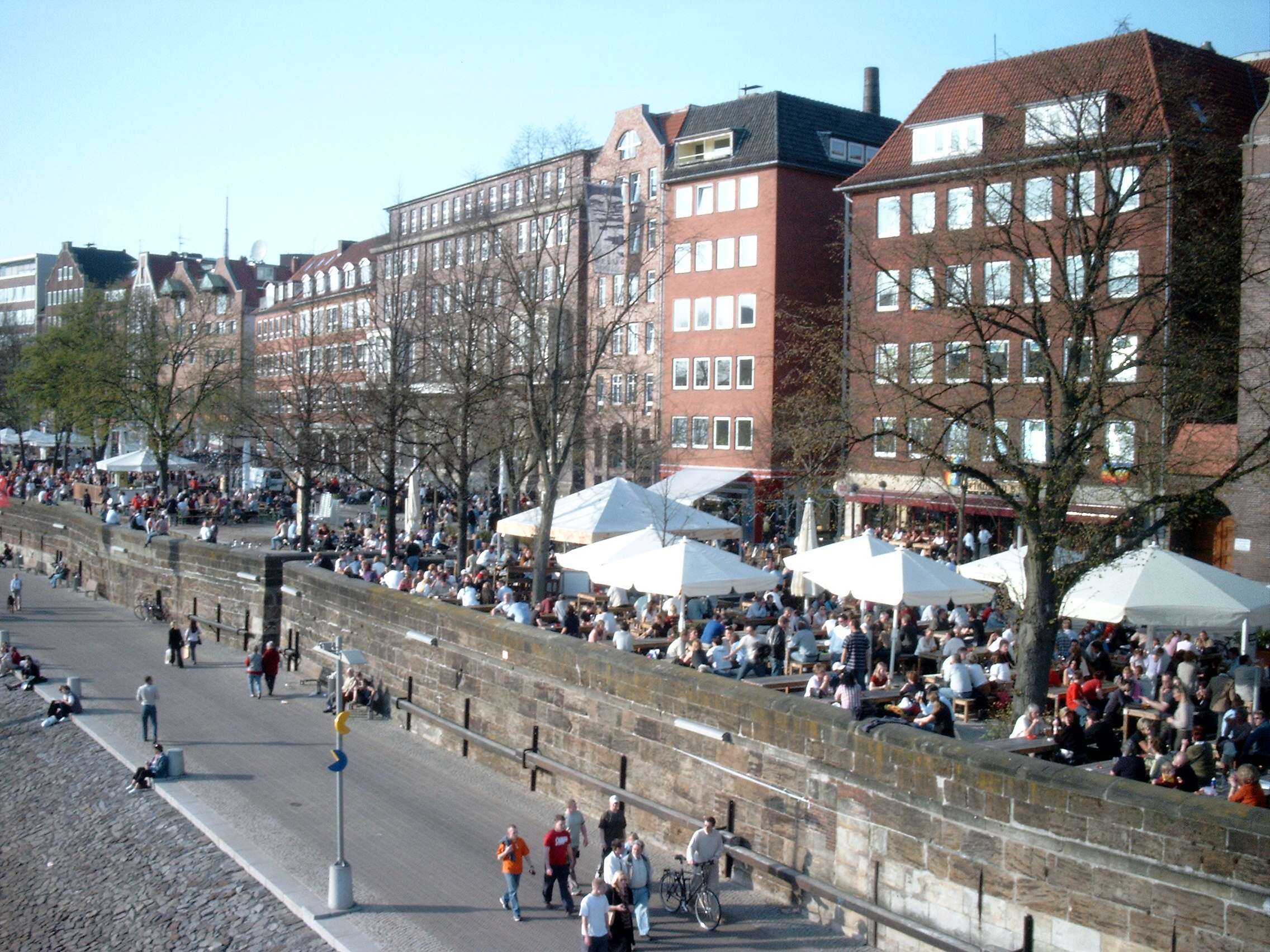
Schlachte

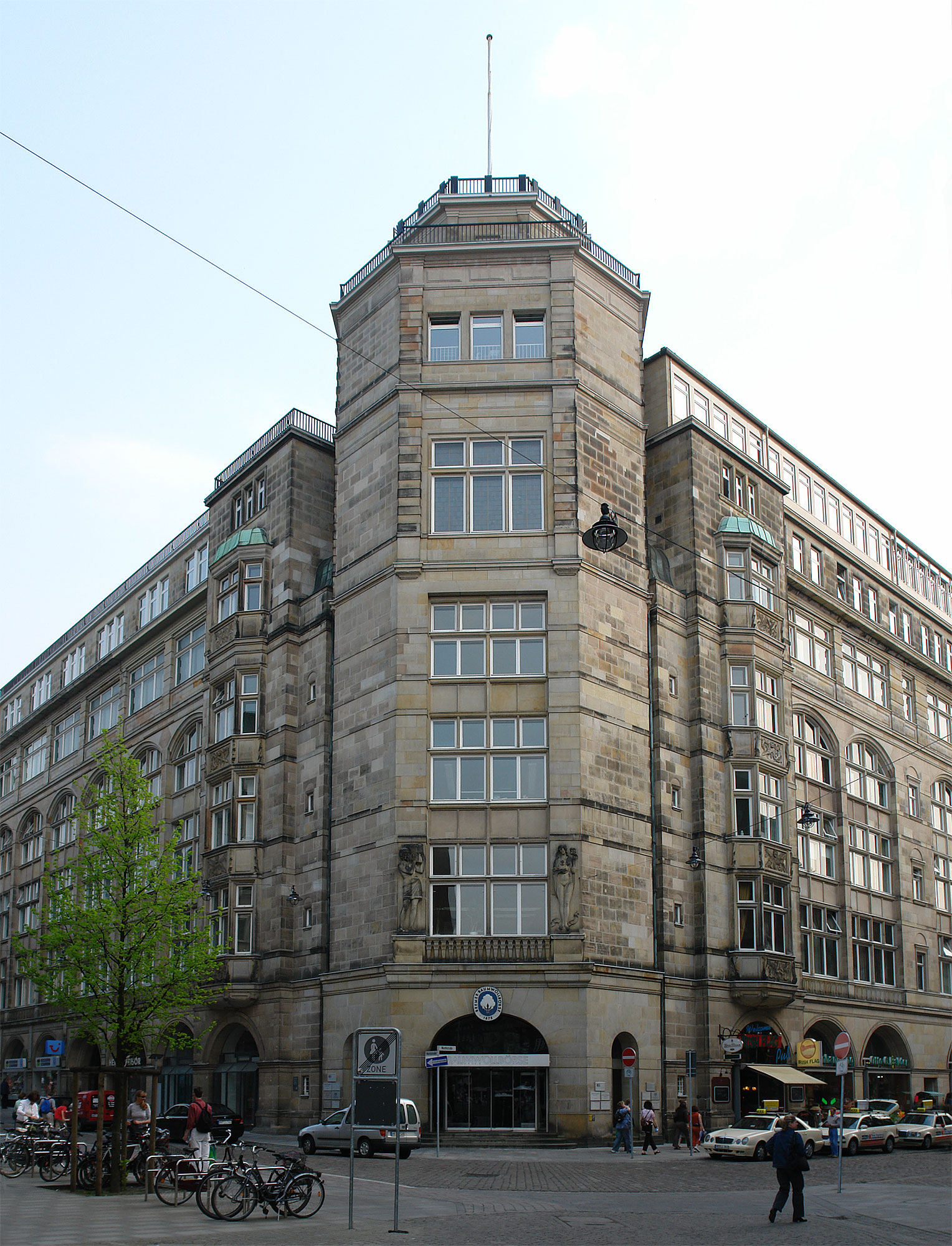
Baumwollbörse (Cotton exchange)

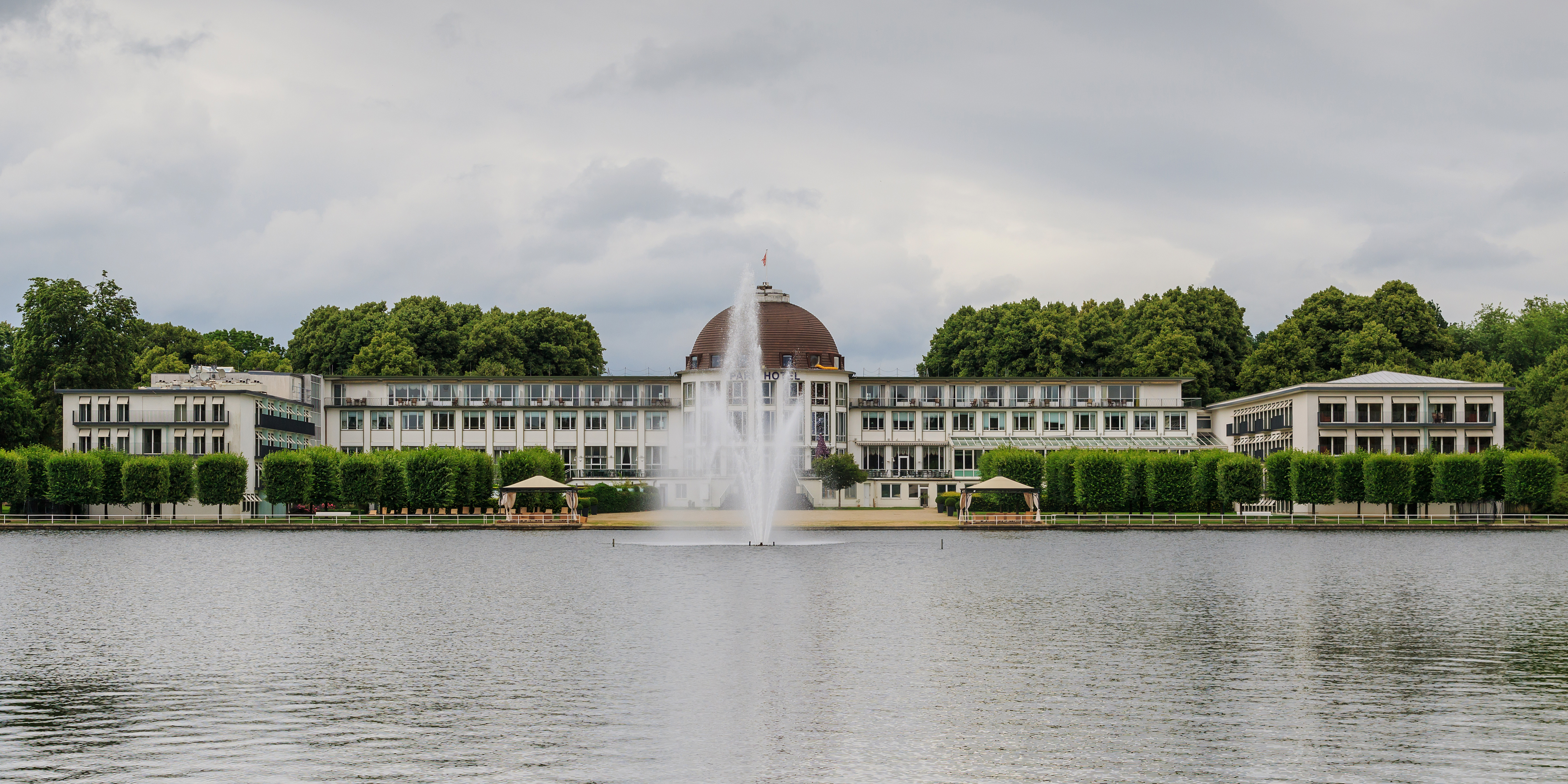
The Parkhotel in the Bürgerpark (central park)

- Many of the sights in Bremen are found in the Altstadt (Old Town), an oval area surrounded by the Weser River, on the southwest, and the Wallgraben, the former moats of the medieval city walls, on the northeast. The oldest part of the Altstadt is the southeast half, starting with the Marktplatz and ending at the Schnoor quarter.
- The Marktplatz (Market square) is dominated by the opulent façade of the Town Hall of Bremen. The building was erected between 1405 and 1410 in Gothic style, but the façade was built two centuries later (1609–12) in Renaissance style. The Town Hall is the seat of the president of the Senate of Bremen. Today, it hosts a restaurant in original decor with gigantic wine barrels, the Ratskeller in Bremen. In July 2004, along with the Bremen Roland, the building was added to the list of UNESCO World Heritage Sites.
- Two statues stand to the west side of the Town Hall: one is the statue Bremen Roland (1404) of the city's protector, Roland, with his view against the Cathedral and bearing Durendart, the "sword of justice" and a shield decorated with an imperial eagle. The other near the entrance to the Ratskeller is Gerhard Marcks' bronze sculpture (1953) Die Stadtmusikanten (Town Musicians), which portrays the donkey, dog, cat and rooster of the Grimm Brothers' fairy tale.
- Other interesting buildings in the vicinity of the Marktplatz are the Schütting, a sixteenth-century Flemish-inspired guild hall, Rathscafé, Raths-Apotheke, Haus der Stadtsparkasse and the Stadtwaage, the former weigh house (built in 1588), with an ornate Renaissance façade, and the nearby Essighaus, once a fine Renaissance town house. The façades and houses surrounding the market square were the first buildings in Bremen to be restored after World War II, by the citizens of Bremen themselves.
- St Peter's Cathedral (13th century), to the east of the Marktplatz, with sculptures of Moses and David, Peter and Paul and Charlemagne. The Bismarck Monument is also outside the cathedral, which is the only monument in Germany to depict Otto von Bismarck in an equestrian format.
- On Katherinenklosterhof to the northwest of the cathedral, a few remaining traces can be found of St. Catherine's Monastery, Bremen dating back to the thirteenth century.
- The Liebfrauenkirche (Our Lady's Church) is the oldest church of the town (11th century). Its crypt features several impressive murals from the fourteenth century.
- Off the south side of the Markplatz, the 110 m (120 yd) Böttcherstraße was transformed in 1923–1931 by the coffee magnate Ludwig Roselius, who commissioned local artists to convert the narrow street (in medieval times, the street of the barrel makers) into an inspired mixture of Gothic and Art Nouveau. It was considered "entartete Kunst" (degenerate art) by the Nazis. Today, the street is one of Bremen's most popular attractions, with the Glockenspiel House at No. 4 with its carillon of Meissen porcelain bells.
- At the end of Böttcherstraße, by the Weser bank, stands the Martinikirche (St Martin's Church), a Gothic brick church built in 1229, and rebuilt in 1960 after its destruction in World War II.
- Tucked away between the Cathedral and the river is the Schnoor, a small, well-preserved area of crooked lanes, fishermen's and shipper's houses from the seventeenth and eighteenth centuries, now occupied by cafés, artisan shops and art galleries. The Convent of Saint Birgitta (Birgittenkloster) founded in 2002 is a small community of just seven nuns offering guest accommodation.
- Schlachte, the medieval harbour of Bremen (the modern port is some kilometres downstream) is today a riverside boulevard with pubs and bars aligned on one side and the banks of Weser on the other.
- The Viertel district to the east of the old town combines rows of nineteenth-century Bremen houses (Bremer Häuser) with museums and the theatres of Theater Bremen along the city's cultural mile (Kulturmeile (Bremen)).
- Knoops Park which is one of the larger green spaces in the city that many locals love to visit especially when the weather is warmer. There is also an option to rent small rowboats in the middle of the park.
- The Nasir Moschee is the first purpose built mosque of the Ahmadiyya Muslim Community in Bremen.

More contemporary tourist attractions include:

- Universum Science Center, a modern science museum
- The Rhododendron-Park Bremen, a major collection of rhododendrons and azaleas; also includes a botanical garden
- Botanika, a nature museum within the Rhododendron-Park Bremen that attempts be to the same as the Universum, but for biology
- Beck's Brewery, tours are available to the public which include beer tasting
- The Kunsthalle Bremen, an art museum with paintings from the nineteenth and twentieth century, maintained by the citizens of Bremen
- Focke Museum, museum of art and cultural history
- The Übersee Museum Bremen (Overseas (World) Museum) is a natural history and ethnographic museum near by the Central Station Bremen.
- The Kunstsammlungen Böttcherstraße, an art museum in expressionist architecture from Bernhard Hoetger with paintings from the twentieth century from Paula Modersohn-Becker
- The Weserburg Museum für moderne Kunst ("Weserburg Modern Art Museum"), a modern art museum located in the middle of the Weser River

=== Structures ===
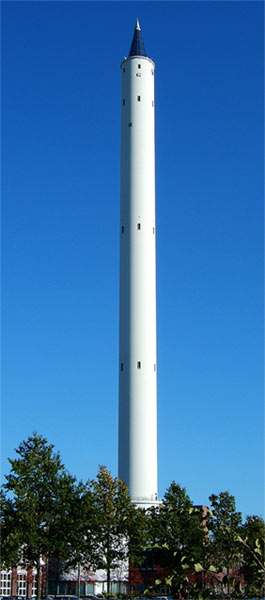
The Fallturm (Drop Tower) of the University of Bremen

- Mediumwave transmitter Bremen
- Fallturm Bremen
- Bremen-Walle Telecommunication Tower

The Freie Waldorfschule in Bremen-Sebaldsbrück was Germany's first school built to the Passivhaus low-energy building standard.

== Economy ==
According to OECD data, Bremen had a GDP per capita of $53,379 in 2013, higher than the average for Germany as a whole. For comparison, in 2013, the World Bank reported Germany had a GDP per capita of $46,268, and the EU overall had a GDP per capita of $35,408 in the same year.

Bremen is the second development centre of the region, after Hamburg. It forms part of the production network of Airbus SAS and this is where equipping of the wing units for all widebody Airbus aircraft and the manufacture of small sheet metal parts takes place. Structural assembly, including that of metal landing flaps, is another focal point. Within the framework of Airbus A380 production, assembly of the landing flaps (high lift systems) is carried out here. The pre-final assembly of the fuselage section (excluding the cockpit) of the A400M military transport aircraft takes place before delivery on to Spain.

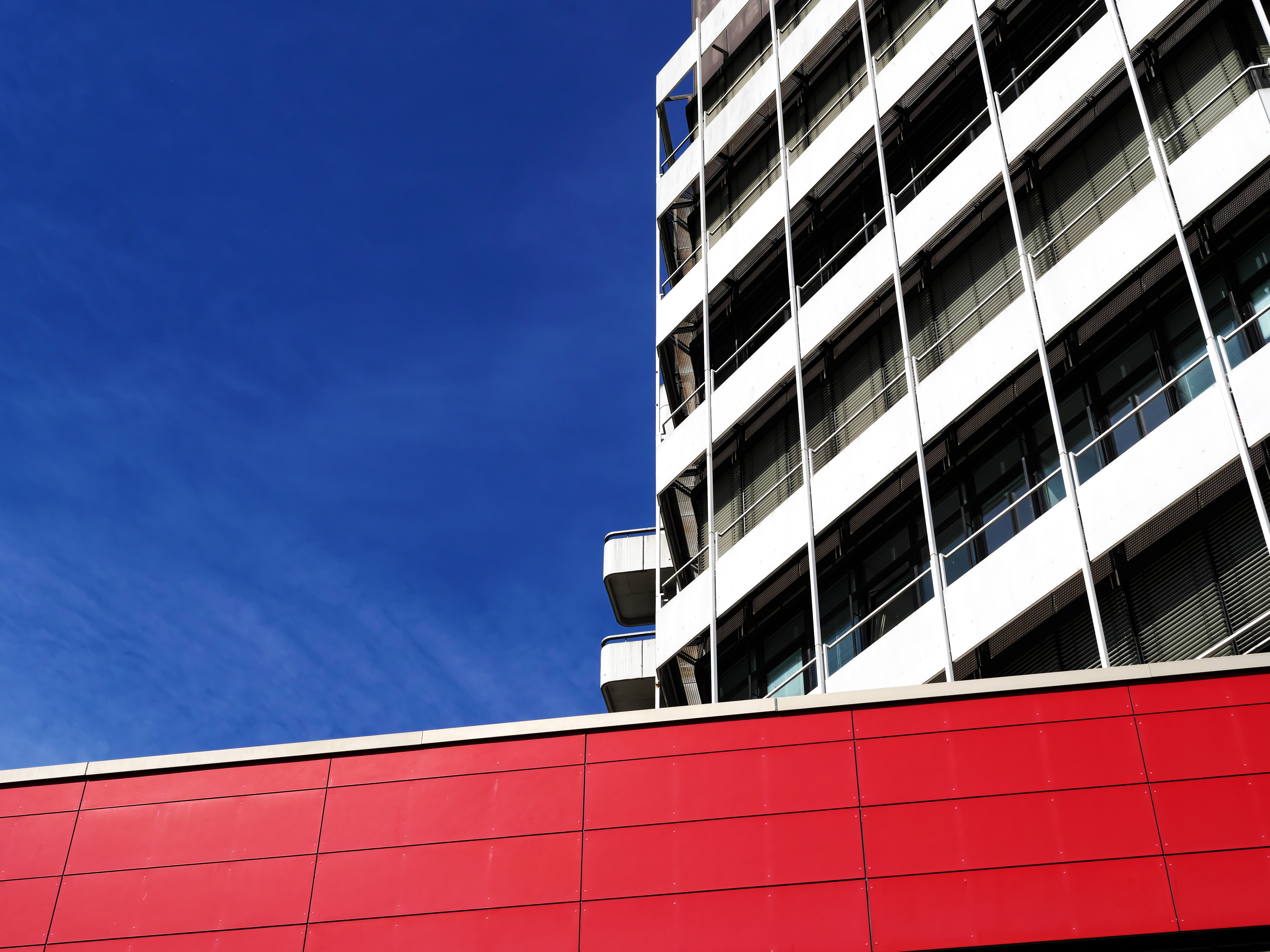
MZH building, campus of the University of Bremen

More than 3,100 persons are employed at Airbus Bremen, the second largest Airbus site in Germany. As part of the Centre of Excellence – Wing/Pylon, Bremen is responsible for the design and manufacture of high-lift systems for the wings of Airbus aircraft. The entire process chain for the high-lift elements is established here, including the project office, technology engineering, flight physics, system engineering, structure development, verification tests, structural assembly, wing equipping and ultimate delivery to the final assembly line. In addition, Bremen manufactures sheet metal parts like clips and thrust crests for all Airbus aircraft as part of the Centre of Excellence – Fuselage and Cabin.

In Bremen there is a plant of EADS Astrium and the headquarters of OHB-System, respectively the first and the third space companies of European Union.

There is also a Mercedes-Benz factory in Bremen, building the C, CLK, SL, SLK, and GLK series of cars.

Beck & Co's headlining brew Beck's and St Pauli Girl beers are brewed in Bremen. In past centuries when Bremen's port was the "key to Europe", the city also had a large number of wine importers, but the number is down to a precious few. Apart from that there is another link between Bremen and wine: about 800 years ago, quality wines were produced here. Bremen is not the place where the largest wine cellar in the world is located although it was once said to hold over 1 million bottles, but during WWII was raided by occupying forces.

A large number of food producing or trading companies are located in Bremen with their German or European headquarters: Anheuser-Busch InBev (Beck's Brewery), Kellogg's, Kraft Foods (Kraft, Jacobs Coffee, Milka Chocolate, Milram, Miràcoli), Frosta (frosted food), Nordsee (chain of sea fast food), Melitta Kaffee, Eduscho Kaffee, Azul Kaffee, Vitakraft (pet articles and food for cats, dogs, birds, fish, rodents and other pets), Atlanta AG (Chiquita banana), chocolatier Hachez (fine chocolate and confiserie), feodora chocolatier.

Bremer Woll-Kämmerei (BWK), a worldwide operating company for manufacturing wool and trading in wool and similar products, is headquartered in Bremen. Gleistein is a German cordage factory with head office in Bremen.

== Transport ==
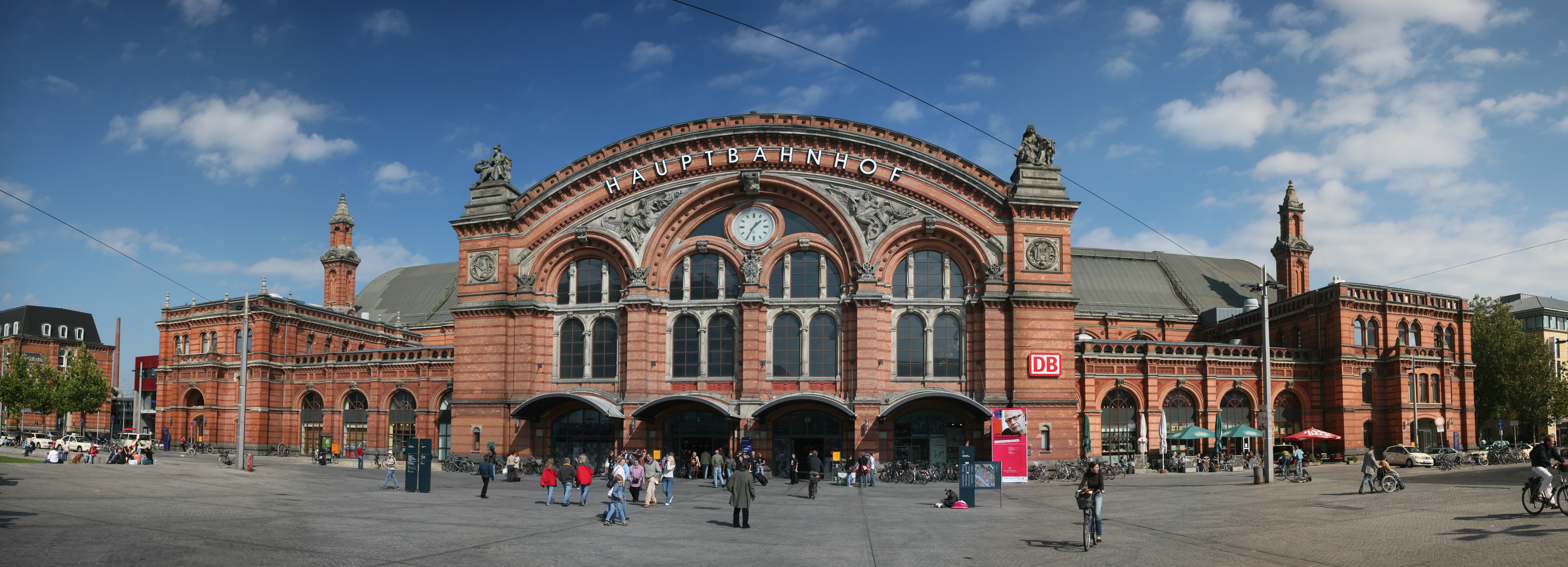
Bremen Central Station

Map of the Bremen S-Bahn

Bremen has an international airport situated 3 km (2 mi) south of the city centre.

Trams in Bremen and local bus services are offered by the Bremer Straßenbahn AG (translates from German as Bremen Tramways Corporation), often abbreviated BSAG, the public transport provider for Bremen.

The Bremen S-Bahn covers the Bremen/Oldenburg Metropolitan Region, from Bremerhaven in the north to Twistringen in the south and from Oldenburg in the west, centred on Bremen Central Station. It has been in operation since 2010. This network unified existing regional transport in Bremen as well as surrounding cities, including Bremerhaven, Delmenhorst, Twistringen, Nordenham, Oldenburg, and Verden an der Aller. The network lies completely within the area of the Bremen-Lower Saxony Transport Association, whose tariff structure applies.

== Events ==
- On August 8, 1992, in Weserstadion, Michael Jackson performed a show as part of his Dangerous World Tour. It was one of his three shows in Bremen and on his next and last tour he kicked off the HIStory World Tour in Bremen.
- Every year since 1036, in the last two weeks of October, Bremen has hosted the Freimarkt ("Free market"), one of the world's oldest and in Germany one of today's biggest continuously celebrated fairground festivals.
- Bremen is host to one of the four big annual Techno parades, the Vision Parade.
- Bremen is also host of the "Bremer 6 Tage Rennen" a bicycle race at the Bremen Arena.
- Every year the city plays host to young musicians from across the world, playing in the International Youth Symphony Orchestra of Bremen (IYSOB).
- On March 12, 1999, the rock band Kiss played a live show in Bremen. Before the show, they were told by the fire marshall not to use any fireworks. They did not use any fireworks until the very end, when they set off all of the fireworks at once. Because of this, they are now banned from playing in Bremen.
- Bremen was host to the 2006 RoboCup competition.
- Bremen was host to the 32nd Deutscher Evangelischer Kirchentag, 20–24 May 2009.
- Bremen hosted the 50th International Mathematical Olympiad (IMO) from 10–22 July 2009.
- The Rolling Stones named a Live Album "Bridges to Bremen", which was recorded 1998 in Bremen.

== Sports ==
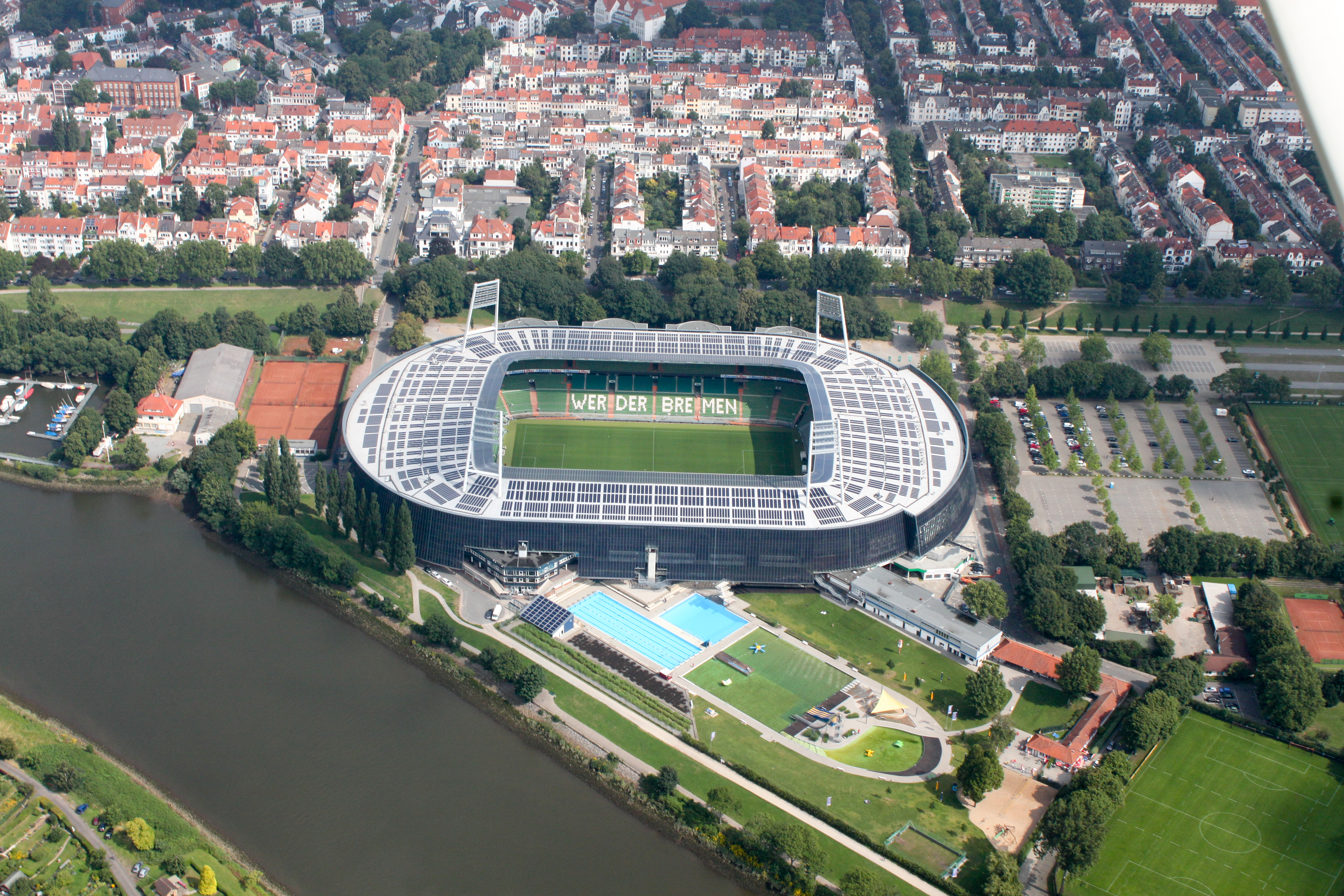
Weserstadion is the home ground of Werder Bremen.

Bremen is home to the football team Werder Bremen, who won the German Football Championship for the fourth time and the German Football Cup for the fifth time in 2004, making them only the fourth team in German football history to win the double; the club won the German Football Cup for the sixth time in 2009. The home stadium of SV Werder Bremen is the Weserstadion, a pure football stadium, almost completely surrounded by solar cells. It is one of the biggest buildings in Europe delivering renewable energy.

== Education ==
With 18,000 students, the University of Bremen is the largest university in Bremen, and is also home to the international Goethe-Institut and the Fallturm Bremen. Additionally, Bremen has a University of the Arts and the Bremen University of Applied Sciences. In 2001, the private Jacobs University Bremen was founded. All major German research foundations maintain institutes in Bremen, with a focus on marine sciences: The Max Planck Society with the Max Planck Institute for Marine Microbiology, and the Gottfried Wilhelm Leibniz Scientific Community with the Center for Tropical Marine Ecology (zmt). The Bremerhaven-based Alfred-Wegener-Institute of the Helmholtz Association closely cooperates with the aforementioned institutes, especially within the MARUM a center for marine environmental sciences, affiliated to the University of Bremen. Furthermore, The Fraunhofer Society is present in Bremen with centers for applied material research (IFAM) and medical image computing (MEVIS). The Centre for Economics Education in the Unterwesergebiet (BWU) is a vocational education and training institution based in Bremen. It specializes in providing business-related education and professional development programs for individuals and businesses.

== Miscellaneous ==
- In December 1949, Bremen hosted the lecture cycle Einblick in das, was ist by the philosopher Martin Heidegger, in which Heidegger introduced his concept of a "fourfold" of earth and sky, gods and mortals. This was also Heidegger's first public-speaking engagement following his removal from his Freiburg professorship by the Denazification authorities.
- Bremen is connected with a fairy tale by the Brothers Grimm, the Town Musicians of Bremen, although they never actually reach Bremen in the tale.
- The 1922 film Nosferatu, eine Symphonie des Grauens was set mostly in Bremen.
- In July 2022, Yorushika released a song titled Bremen.
- The UK Comedy podcast "Three Bean Salad" have great affection for Bremen, and regularly listeners to their podcast will claim to be from Bremen, and they have postulated potential world tours including Bremen.

== Twin towns – sister cities ==
Bremen is twinned with:

- Gdańsk, Poland (1976)
- Riga, Latvia (1985)
- Dalian, China (1985)
- Rostock, Germany (1987)
- Haifa, Israel (1988)
- Bratislava, Slovakia (1989)
- Corinto, Nicaragua (1989)
- İzmir, Turkey (1995)
- Pune, India (1997)
- Durban, South Africa (2011)
- Odesa, Ukraine (2023)

== See also ==
- List of mayors of Bremen
