= Bremen (state) =

State in Germany

Free Hanseatic City of Bremen Freie Hansestadt Bremen (German) Free Hansestadt Bremen (Low German)
- State
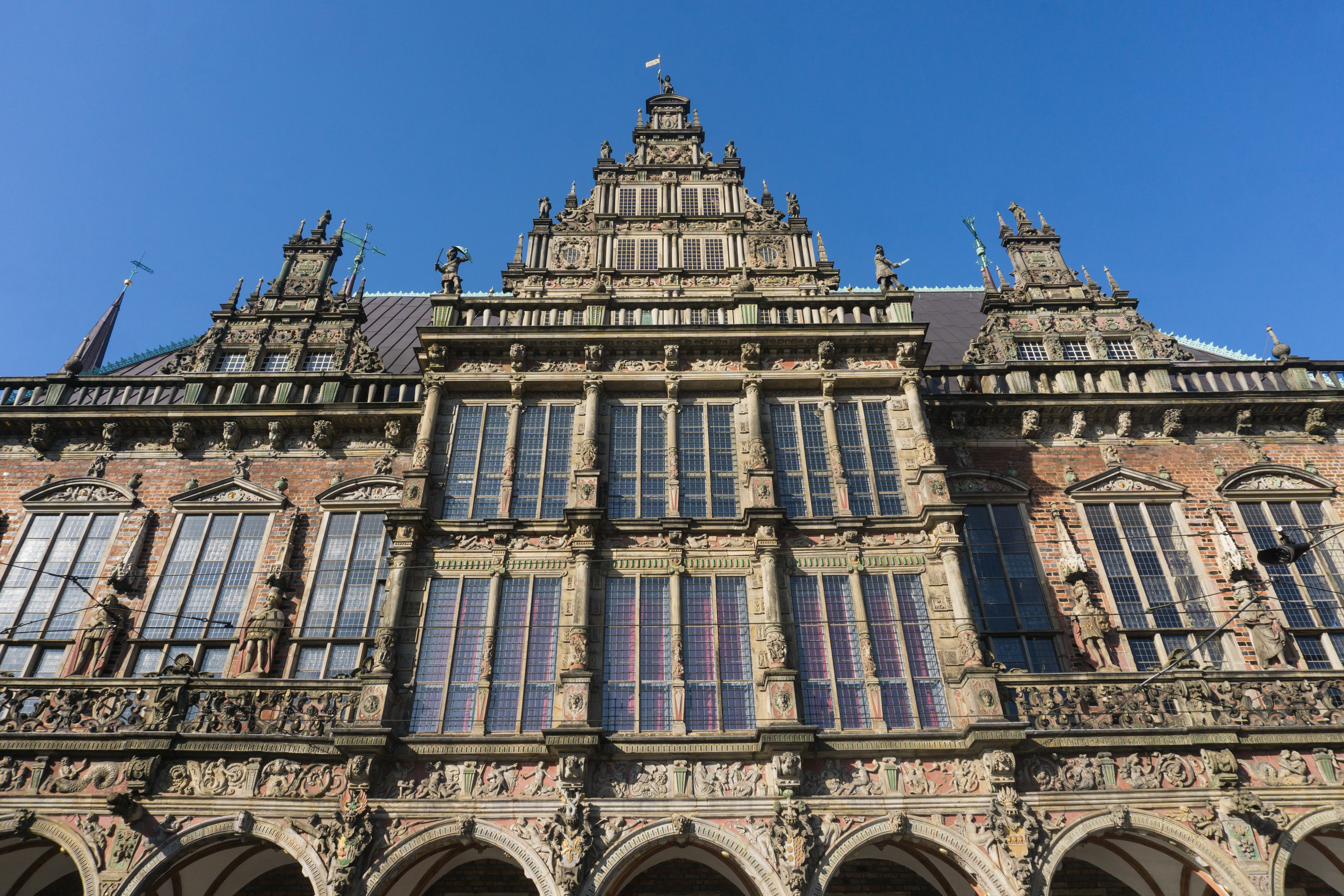
- Bremen City Hall

- Flag Coat of arms Brandmark
- Interactive map of Free Hanseatic City of Bremen
- Coordinates: 53°20′50″N 8°35′29″E
- Country: Germany
- Capital (and largest city): Bremen

Government
  - Body: Bürgerschaft of Bremen
  - Senate President and Mayor: Andreas Bovenschulte (SPD)
  - Governing parties: SPD / Alliance 90/The Greens / The Left
  - Bundesrat votes: 3 (of 69)
  - Bundestag seats: 5 (of 630) (as of 2025)

Area
  - City: 419.61 km^{2} (162.01 sq mi)

Population (2023-12-31)
  - City: 691,703
  - Density: 1,648.4/km^{2} (4,269.4/sq mi)

GDP
  - Total: €43.011 billion (2025)
  - Per capita: €61,019 (2025)
- Time zone: UTC+1 (CET)
  - Summer (DST): UTC+2 (CEST)
- ISO 3166 code: DE-HB
- Vehicle registration: HB (1906–1947; again since 1956); BM (1947); AE (1947–1956)
- NUTS Region: DE5
- HDI (2022): 0.954 very high · 5th of 16
- Website: bremen.de

Bremen (German: [ˈbʁeːmən]), officially the Free Hanseatic City of Bremen (German: Freie Hansestadt Bremen; Low German: Free Hansestadt Bremen), is the smallest and least populous of Germany's 16 states. It is informally called Land Bremen ('State of Bremen'), although the term is sometimes used in official contexts. The state consists of the capital and larger city of Bremen and a less populated seaport exclave, Bremerhaven, surrounded by the larger state of Lower Saxony in northern Germany.

== Geography ==
The state of Bremen consists of four non-contiguous territories. The two primary enclaves contain Bremen, officially the 'City' (Stadtgemeinde Bremen) which is the state capital, and the city of Bremerhaven (Stadt Bremerhaven). Both are located on the River Weser; Bremerhaven ("Bremen's harbour") is further downstream on the mouth of the Weser with open access to the North Sea. Both enclaves are completely surrounded by the neighbouring State of Lower Saxony (Niedersachsen). Of the two smaller non-contiguous territories of the state of Bremen, the first is an exclave of Bremerhaven north east of the city and part of the Fehrmoor Ortsteil (which is part of the larger Leherheide Neighborhood). The second is a tiny exclave of the City of Bremen on its north side, centered on Opitzstrasse and comprising only about 4.3 hectares. Like the two primary territories of the State of Bremen, these two smaller territories are completely surrounded by the neighbouring State of Lower Saxony. In addition, an exclave of the City of Bremen, known as "Citybremian Overseas Port Area Bremerhaven" (Stadtbremisches Überseehafengebiet Bremerhaven), lies entirely within the City of Bremerhaven. The highest point in the state is in Friedehorst Park (32.5 metres; 107 ft).

== History ==
When the Holy Roman Empire was dissolved in 1806, what had been the Free Imperial City of Bremen since 1646 (after earlier privileges of autonomy of 1186) was not mediatised. Rather than being incorporated into the enlarged territory of one of the surrounding monarchies, it was recognised (along with Hamburg and Lübeck) as a sovereign Free Hanseatic City. Its currency until 1873 was the Bremen thaler.

In 1811, in an effort to enforce Napoleon's Berlin Decree embargoing Britain, the First French Empire had annexed the city-state. But at the Congress of Vienna of 1815, Bremen's emissary, and later burgomaster, Johann Smidt, lobbied successfully to have the city's independence restored as one of the 39 sovereign states within the new German Confederation.

In 1827, Bremen bought land at the mouth of the Weser from the Kingdom of Hanover, in order to build a new seaport, Bremerhaven. This ensured that Bremen remained Germany's main port of embarkation for emigrants to the Americas, and that it developed as an entrepôt for Germany's late developing colonial trade.

In 1867, the year following Prussia's defeat of Austria and its annexation of Hanover, Bremen joined the North German Confederation. In 1871, following victory over the French, this became the German Empire with Bremen as one of the Reich's 26 constituent states.

As an international port and industrial centre, Bremen had a strong left and liberal tradition. In January 1913, at the last elections to the Imperial Reichstag in Berlin, the Social Democrats (SPD) secured over half the vote, or 53.4%. Left Liberals (Linksliberale) took another 41.4%. Only 5.1% went to the Conservatives. During the Weimar Republic, there were seven elections to the Bürgerschaft, the Bremen parliament. At the November 1932 German federal election, the last broadly free election during this time, the Social Democrats won 31.2% of the vote, and the Communists (KPD) 16.8%, compared to 20.8% for the Nazis.

Following the heavily compromised national elections of March 1933, the Nazis still achieved only a third of the popular vote in Bremen (32.7%). Bremen, like all the German states, then underwent the process of Gleichschaltung (coordination) whereby the Nazi regime, through a campaign of violent demonstrations and intimidation, first forced the resignation of the executive Senate and later dissolved the Bürgerschaft. Bremen remained for the next twelve years under the direct authority of a Reichsstatthalter (Reich Governor) who simultaneously held the post of Nazi Party Gauleiter of Gau Weser-Ems. During these years, Bremen's small Jewish community (1,438 people registered at the beginning of 1933) was destroyed through coerced emigration and deportation to death camps in the occupied east.

Allied bombing during World War II destroyed or severely damaged 60% of the city's built fabric, including much of its historic centre. Following a further bombardment, British troops entered Bremen in late April 1945. Transferred to the Americans, Bremen became the supply port for the US zones of occupation in west Berlin and southern Germany.

The city was reestablished as a state in 1947 and, from 1949, was again known as the Free Hanseatic City of Bremen, becoming a Land or state of the new Federal Republic of Germany, informally referred to as "West Germany" until 1990.

Religion in Bremen – 31 December 2025
Religion	Percent
None or other	67.4%
EKD Protestants	24.7%
Roman Catholics	7.9%

== Politics ==
=== Political system ===
The legislature of the state of Bremen is the 87-member Bürgerschaft (citizens' assembly), elected by the citizens in the two cities of Bremen and Bremerhaven.

The executive is constituted by the Senate of Bremen, elected by the Bürgerschaft. The Senate is chaired by the President of the senate (Senatspräsident), who is also one of the mayors of the city of Bremen (Bürgermeister) and is elected directly by the Bürgerschaft. The Senate selects one of its members as a second mayor who serves as deputy of the president. In contrast to the Federal Chancellor of Germany or other German states, the President of the Senate has no authority to override senators on policy, which is decided upon by the senate collectively. Since 1945, the Senate has continuously been dominated by the Social Democratic Party.

On a municipal level, the two cities in the state are administered separately:

- The administration of the city of Bremen is headed by the two mayors and controlled by the portion of the Bürgerschaft elected in the city of Bremen (72 members).
- Bremerhaven, on the other hand, has a municipal assembly distinct from the state legislature and an administration under a distinct head mayor (Oberbürgermeister) and a distinct second mayor.

=== Political majorities ===
In post-war Bremen, the port, shipyards and related industries sustained a large and unionised working class. As before 1933, this translated into support for the Social Democrats, considered Bremen's natural governing party. However, in the 1980s mechanisation of the port and closure of the city's leading shipbuilder induced an employment crisis and shook the confidence of the party's traditional voter base. The SPD, which had still polled 51% in 1987, lost its effective majority. The once dominant left-liberal vote split, and coalition government became the norm.

The 2019 Bremen state election was held on 26 May 2019 to elect the members of the Bürgerschaft of Bremen, as well as the city councils of Bremen and Bremerhaven. The election took place on the same day as the 2019 European Parliament election. The Christian Democratic Union (CDU), for the first time, became the largest party in the Bürgerschaft, while the Social Democratic Party (SPD) fell to second place. The Greens and The Left made small gains. After the election, the SPD, Greens, and Left agreed to form a coalition government. Carsten Sieling resigned as mayor and was replaced by fellow SPD member Andreas Bovenschulte.

Summary of the 26 May 2019 election results for the Bürgerschaft of Bremen
Party	Votes	%	+/-	Seats		Total seats	+/-	Seats %
Party	Votes	%	+/-	Bremen	Bremerhaven	Total seats	+/-	Seats %
Christian Democratic Union (CDU)	391,709	26.7	▲4.3	20	4	24	▲4	28.6
Social Democratic Party (SPD)	366,375	24.9	▼7.9	19	4	23	▼7	27.4
Alliance 90/The Greens (Grüne)	256,181	17.4	▲2.3	13	3	16	▲2	19.0
The Left (Linke)	166,378	11.3	▲1.8	9	1	10	▲2	11.9
Alternative for Germany (AfD)	89,939	6.1	▲0.6	4	1	5	▲1	6.0
Free Democratic Party (FDP)	87,420	5.9	▼0.7	4	1	5	▼1	6.0
Citizens in Rage (BiW)	35,808	2.4	▼0.8	0	1	1	0	1.2
Die PARTEI (PARTEI)	24,433	1.7	▼0.2	0	0	0	±0	0
Free Voters (FW)	14,205	1.0	▲1.0	0	0	0	±0	0
Pirate Party Germany (Piraten)	14,143	1.0	▼0.5	0	0	0	±0	0
Others	22,915	1.6		0	0	0	±0	0
Total	1,469,506	100.0		69	15	84	▲1	
Voter turnout		64.1	▲13.9					

Popular Vote
CDU	26.66%
SPD	24.93%
B'90/GRÜNE	17.43%
DIE LINKE	11.32%
AfD	6.12%
FDP	5.95%
BiW	2.44%
Other	5.15%

Bürgerschaft seats
CDU	28.57%
SPD	27.38%
B'90/GRÜNE	19.05%
DIE LINKE	11.90%
AfD	5.95%
FDP	5.95%
BiW	1.19%

=== Coat of arms ===
The coat of arms and flag of Bremen state include:

Flag of Bremen

Greater coat of arms

Medium coat of arms

Lesser coat of arms

Coat of arms symbol

== Economy ==
Bremen's post-World War II economy boomed in line with the Wirtschaftswunder (English: "economic miracle") of the 1950s and 1960s in West Germany. This saw the growth and permanent settlement in Bremen of a large migrant worker population of Gastarbeiter (English: "guest workers"), drawn largely from Turkey and other countries in Southern Europe.

Some of the city's heavier industries failed to recover from the 1973 oil-price-shock recession. Specialist construction yards, ship outfitters and parts suppliers remain, but AG Weser (which employed 16,000 workers at its peak) and Bremer Vulkan, Bremen's major shipbuilders, closed in 1983 and 1997 respectively. Further job losses were caused by the restructuring and increasing mechanization of harbour-related activities and other industrial sectors. Semi and unskilled harbour workers found it very difficult to re-enter the labour market, and unemployment—for a period in the 1980s almost double the West German average—remained comparatively high.

At a time when structural change in the economy has forced Bremen to spend more on social services, suburbanization has reduced population and tax revenue, namely due to 1969 federal tax reform—before that, income taxes would be collected by the municipality of the workplace, but after that, by the municipality of the residency. Incorporating surrounding suburban municipalities is not an option for the state of Bremen, as these already belong to the state of Lower Saxony.

With financial assistance from the European Union and the Federal Government of Germany, economic policy has focused on supporting those established economic sectors that are based on advanced technology, such as aerospace and aircraft production, automobile production, maritime and logistics services, and on developing the education and business-park infrastructure for new science-based and digital enterprises. In this an important role is accorded to the growing university sector. Further investment went into the revitalisation of the city centre but a culture-driven regeneration around entertainment and tourism was not very successful. Several experts described Bremen's service sector as underdeveloped, due to a lack of major company headquarters.

=== Unemployment ===
At the turn of the 21st century, unemployment in Bremen stood at 13%, a rate matched in the Federal Republic only by the "new states" in the former German Democratic Republic (GDR). By 2022, while reduced to 10.2% it was the highest among all 16 German states.

Year	2000	2001	2002	2003	2004	2005	2006	2007	2008	2009	2010	2011	2012	2013	2014	2015	2016	2017	2018	2019	2020	2021
Unemployment rate in %	13.0	12.4	12.5	13.2	13.2	16.8	14.9	12.7	11.4	11.8	12.0	11.6	11.2	11.1	10.9	10.9	10.5	10.2	9.8	9.9	11.2	10.7

=== Industries ===
Despite continuing job losses in the industrial sector, the state of Bremen has retained, and continues to develop, a broad manufacturing base:

- Automotive with Mercedes-Benz factory, which is main manufacturing base of C-Class (12,500 employees). Automotive components from Hella and Lear. Assembly lines for powertrain and batteries are supplied from ThyssenKrupp Automation Engineering.
- Aerospace with Airbus aircraft component factories (4,100 employees), rocket components Ariane (550 empl.) and spacecraft OHB (1,200 empl.)
- Iron & Steel with large ArcelorMittal work (3,000 employees);
- Electronic manufacturers for naval/marine Atlas Elektronik (1,400 employees) and defence Rheinmetall Defence Electronics (1,200 employees)
- Shipbuilding represented Lürssen Bremen features the full spectrum of construction, production and assembly facilities for superyachts greater than 100 in length (1,200 employees).
- Food manufacturing of coffee (Kraft, Jacobs, Melitta, Eduscho, Azul), beer (Beck's Brewery), fish (Frosta, Frozen Fish, Deutsche See), dairy products (DMK Deutsches Milchkontor), pet food (Vitacraft)

=== Education ===
The University of Bremen is the largest university in Bremen. It is one of 11 institutions classed as an "Elite university" in Germany, and teaches approximately 23,500 people from 126 countries. Bremen also has a University of the Arts Bremen, a University of Applied Sciences with campuses in both Bremen city and Bremerhaven, and more recently the Jacobs University Bremen, an international research university located in Vegesack.

=== Transport ===
Bremen Airport is the state's main airport which provides flights to other parts of Germany and other European destinations.

== See also ==
- Former countries in Europe after 1815
- Timeline of Bremen (city) history
