= Bremer Woll-Kämmerei =

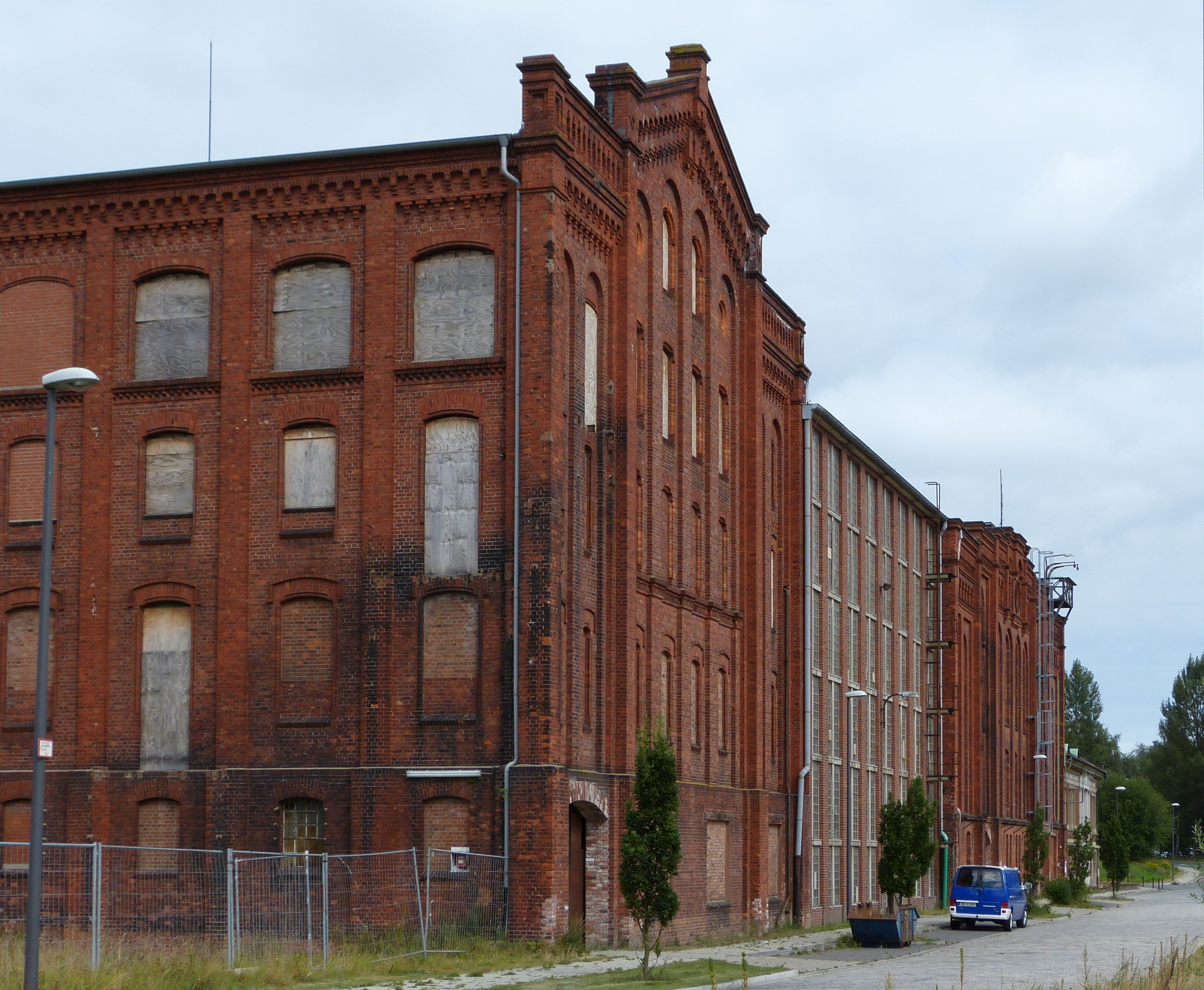
- Bremer Wollkämmerei, house 100 and 101, ridge warehouse in Bremen, Landrat-Christians-Straße 95
- Company type: public limited company ISIN DE000A0BVXQ0
- Industry: Textile industry
- Founded: 1883
- Headquarters: Bremen, Germany
- Key people: Günther Beier, CEO
- Number of employees: 260 (year 2006)
- Website: www.bwk-bremen.de/en/bwk-bremen

Bremer Woll-Kämmerei (BWK) is a worldwide operating company for manufacturing wool and trading in wool and similar products. The company is located in Bremen and has branches in Australia, New Zealand, and Turkey. For some time, it has been the world's largest company in this special section of economy.

== History ==
The origin Bremer Woll-Kämmerei was founded in 1883 as a joint stock company. Investors were the consuls Albrecht, Weinlich and Delius, the merchants H. Claussen, J. Fritze, J. Hachez and C. Kulenkampff. Ferdinand Ullrich became business director, and Paul Zschörner technical director. Zschörner chose an area of 500,000 squaremetres between the River Weser and the Blumenthaler Aue. On 11 September 1884, the production started with 150 workers. In 1896, already 2000 workers were busy, and the number increased to 3700 until 1930.

A new branch near Istanbul (Turkey) started production in 2003. Since 20 March 2007, the company was no longer listed on the Bremen Stock Exchange, the main shareholder and investor Elders took 100% of the Aktiengesellschaft. With this, an important part of the history of the Bremen Stock Exchange ended after 119 years.

The shareholders decided to close the production facilities in Bremen during the year 2009.
