= Mahndorfer See =

Lake in Bremen, Germany

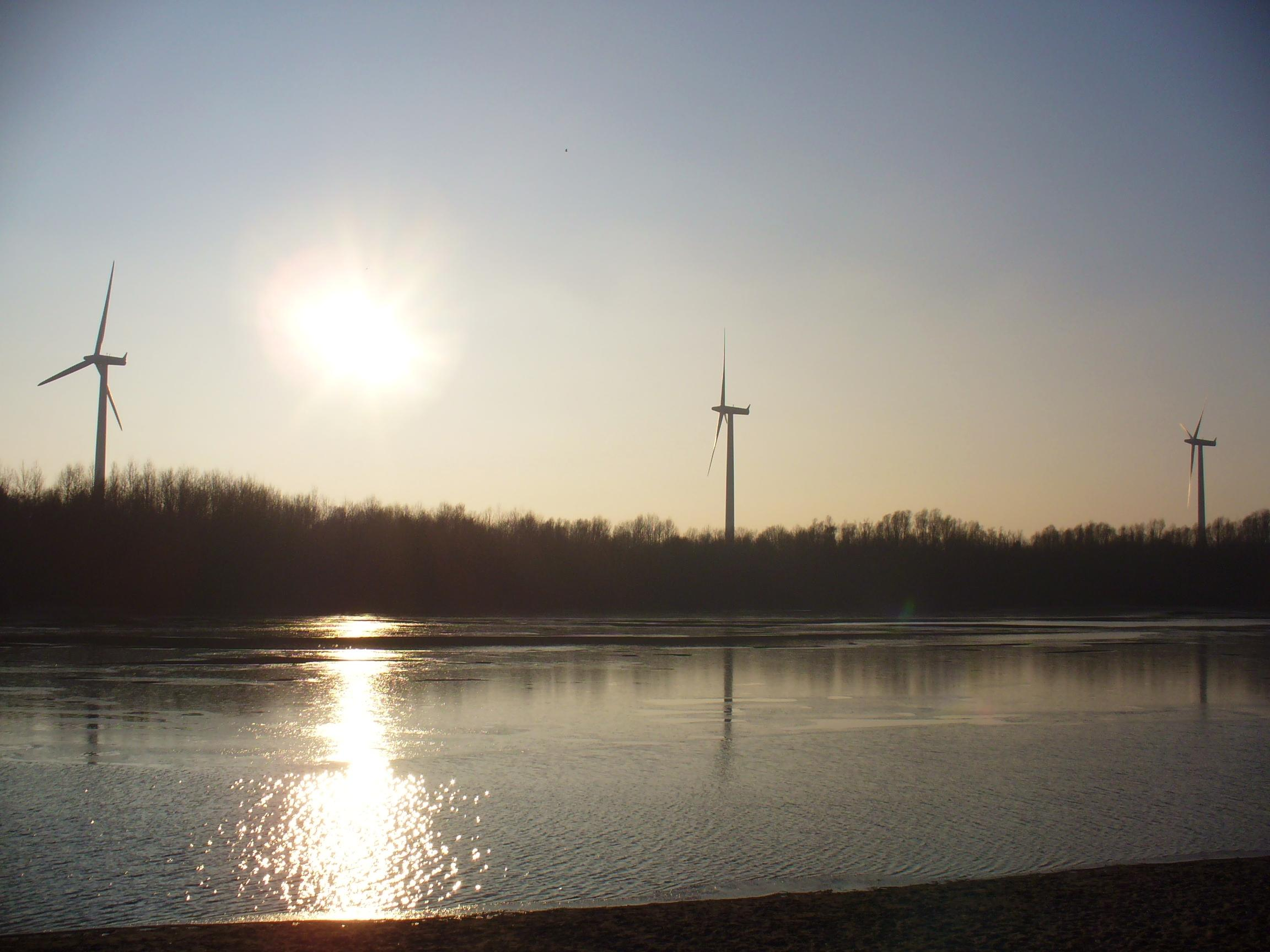

- Location within Germany
- Location: Bremen
- Coordinates: 53°01′47″N 08°56′34″E
- Basin countries: Germany
- Surface area: 22.4 ha (55 acres)
- Max. depth: 13 m (43 ft)
- Settlements: Bremen

Mahndorfer See is a lake in Bremen, Germany. Its surface area is 22.4 hectares (55 acres), and its maximum depth 13 metres (43 ft).

== See also ==
- Stadtwaldsee (Bremen)
- Kuhgrabensee
