= Bürgerpark and Stadtwald =

Public park and forest in Bremen, Germany

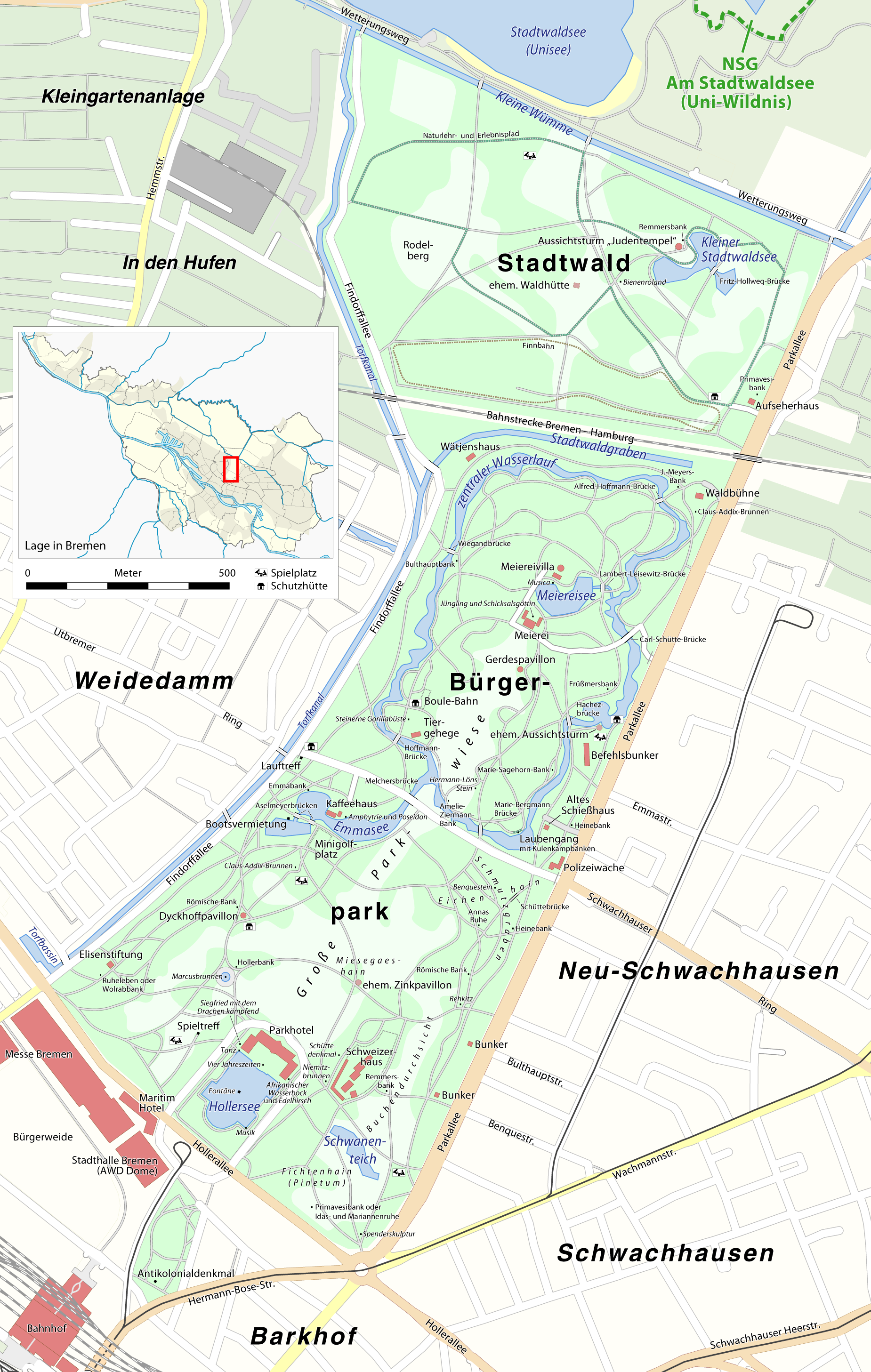
- Map of the Bürgerpark and the city forest

- Location within Bremen
- Coordinates: 53°05′52″N 8°49′47″E
- Area: 200 ha (490 acres)

Bürgerpark and Stadtwald are the best-known parks in Bremen. With a combined area of more than 200 hectares, it is the second largest green space in the Hanseatic city after the Park links der Weser.

The Bürgerpark was created in the second half of the 19th century not far from the main railway station as a classic public garden with lakes, coffee houses and sunbathing lawns within the wooded areas. In the period after 1900, the 65-hectare city forest was created to the north. Together they now offer visitors a wide range of leisure activities with attractions as diverse as animal enclosures, a boat hire service, a Finnish course, nature trails and mini golf and boules pitches.

Both the city forest and the Bürgerpark are home to numerous sculptures and monuments, some of which are more than 130 years old, as well as several listed buildings in harmonious natural ensembles. To this day, maintenance is carried out without regular funding from the public purse by the Bürgerparkverein, which is supported exclusively by contributions and donations. One of its most important sources of income is the "Bürgerpark Tombola", which has been held annually from the beginning of February until May since 1953.

== Location ==
Bürgerpark and Stadtwald are located around one kilometer north-east of Bremen's old town and extend in an irregular quadrangle in the same direction. They are located in the Bürgerpark and Neu-Schwachhausen districts of Schwachhausen. Starting in the south at Hollerallee, directly opposite the Stadthalle (now Bremen Arena), the green corridor is bordered by the Torfkanal and Findorffallee to the west along its entire length and by Parkallee to the east. The Bremen loop between Sagehorn and Dreye of the Bremen-Hamburg railroad line acts as the boundary between Bürgerpark and Stadtwald. The two areas are connected by two small pedestrian underpasses on either side of the park. The Wetterungsweg forms the northern boundary. However, the 28.2 hectare Stadtwaldsee (Unisee) and the 11.4 hectare nature reserve "Am Stadtwaldsee (Uni-Wildnis)" extend above it, connecting the parks with the Blockland and thus extending into the city like a green tongue from the extensive marshes.

Unlike many other large urban parks, such as New York's Central Park or Berlin's Tiergarten, Bürgerpark and Stadtwald are not dissected by roads. The only large, uniform passageway from one side to the other is a wide, closed route that begins at the police station in the east, passes the Emmasee lake to the north and exits on the west side. It represents the non-trafficable link in the cross-district road system Waller Ring, Osterfeuerberger Ring, Utbremer Ring in the west and Schwachhauser Ring, Kirchbachstraße in the east. Bürgerpark can be reached by streetcar lines 5, 6 and 8 and bus lines 22, 24, 25, 26, 27 and 28 of Bremer Straßenbahn AG. The surrounding stops are Am Stern, Bürgerpark, Findorffallee, Weidedamm, Weidedamm III, Parkallee, Busestraße/Bürgerpark and Emmastraße/Bürgerpark.

== History ==
=== Citizens' park ===
==== Planning ====
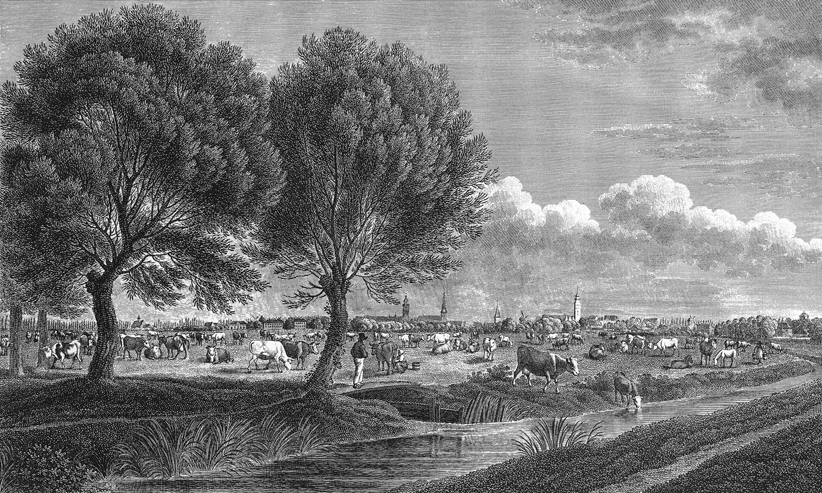
The Bürgerweide looking south towards the city in 1822

The rural cultivation of Bremer Bürgerweide - originally 450 hectares of meadowland north of the city, but reduced in size in the course of urbanization - steadily declined in the 1860s and was completely discontinued in 1864. Another possible use had to be considered. From July 16 to 24, 1865, several thousand marksmen held the Second German Federal Shoot on the meadow. The participants suffered from the strong sunlight and heat on the bare surface, and the idea of a shooting range under trees came up. Although the city authorities planned further events on the Bürgerweide to strengthen "Bremen's reputation in the German Reich", the expanding city also needed recreational areas and green spaces, which at the time were only available in the ramparts.

The merchant and businessman Johann Hermann Holler was probably the main initiator of the idea of reforesting the area. The first meeting of interested citizens took place on September 25 of the same year in Bremen's Ratskeller under the leadership of the merchant Franz Ernst Schütte. It soon became clear that the Senate would not make any funds available for such a project, which is why a citizens' initiative was formed. It was constituted on November 16 as the Committee for the Reforestation of the Bürgerweide with an initial 60 members.

The committee soon commissioned Carl Friedrich Wilhelm Nagel to draw up a general plan. This envisaged playgrounds, a concert garden, lakes, meadows, a riding arena and other typical design elements of a public park. However, Nagel himself rejected his proposal and eventually withdrew it. The project then stalled somewhat, but the committee entered into negotiations with three garden architects. In the end, Wilhelm Benque's plans were chosen. Following this agreement, which promised rapid progress on the work, the association became very popular and soon had around 800 members. Benque was appointed as an employee of the committee and future park director. A complete design plan had been drawn up and a lot of money had been raised in the form of donations before the committee's board submitted a request to the Senate with the intention of putting a section of the Bürgerweide to a different use and creating an "urban grove". The request was granted, and the Senate and the citizens signed over an area of 76 hectares to the planners.

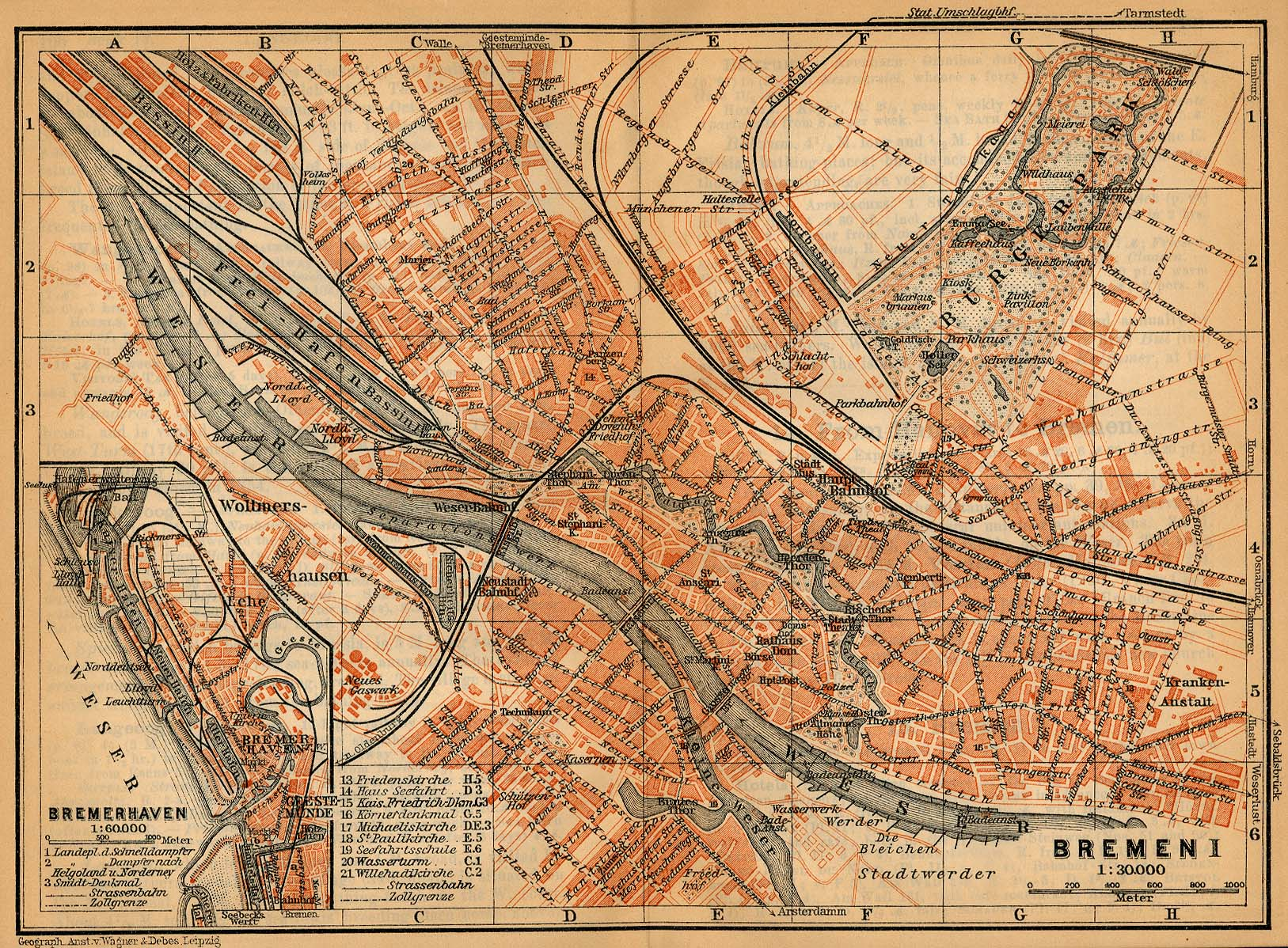
Bremen in 1910, with the Bürgerpark clearly visible. The city forest, which had already been completed and annexed in that year, is not yet shown.

==== Origin ====
The ground-breaking ceremony took place on June 28, 1866, and almost 170 workers completed the first garden architectural measure with the excavation of today's Emmasee. Although Benque revised his plans again at the turn of the year 1866/1867 (including moving the large water basin - later Hollersee - further south on the advice of garden director Johann Heinrich Gustav Meyer), the first trees were planted in the spring of 1867. A few months later, the first coffee house with music pavilion and grotto was built. In August, work began on the main grounds to the south, including the Hollersee lake, which was completed three years later. Almost at the same time, however, Benque withdrew from the project at the end of 1870. Other sources speak of a dismissal.

In 1872, the Bürgerweide woodland committee gave rise to the Bürgerparkverein, which still exists today, and those responsible in the municipal committees approved a further 60 hectares as an extension of the site to the north ("Bürgerwald"). The large parking garage was built in 1873. In that year, the park presented itself for the first time as a homogeneous design unit from the beginning in the south to the street of the Schwachhauser Ring, i.e. over a length of almost one kilometer. In 1874, the shooting range, which had originally prompted the redesign of the Bürgerweide, was opened, and from June 13 to 21 of the same year, the International Agricultural Exhibition was held in the new park. In 1877, the merchant Franz Ernst Schütte was appointed chairman of the association and, as such, significantly advanced the expansion and progress of the design - not least through massive financial contributions from his assets acquired through oil imports. Benque also resumed his post as park director in 1877 and saw the completion of the Meierei three years later. In 1884, he finally resigned after controversial discussions regarding the further development of the park. His successor was Carl Ohrt. The construction work was completed in 1886 and the Bürgerpark was finally laid out.

==== More history ====
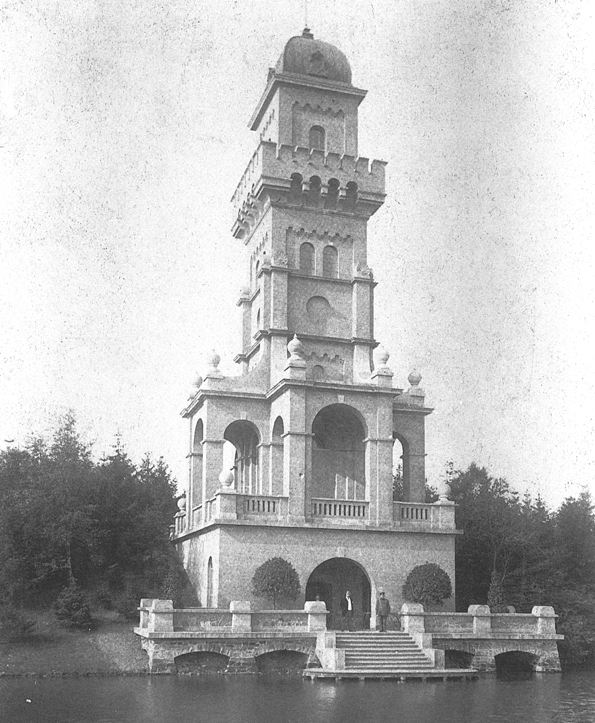
The observation tower in Bürgerpark, built in 1889, destroyed in the Second World War and demolished in 1962

An event of supra-regional importance was the Northwest German Trade and Industrial Exhibition, which was held from May 31 to October 15, 1890, on a 37.5-hectare area in the southern part of the park. The parking garage was demolished and a new building was erected as the main exhibition building. However, this burned down in a major fire in 1907, which is why a third parking garage in the style of a princely country estate was inaugurated six years later.

In Bremen during the National Socialist era, three air raid shelters were built on the east side of the Bürgerpark during the Second World War, which are still preserved. The one opposite the junction of Emmastraße and Parkallee initially served as a command bunker for the 8th anti-aircraft division and later, in 1945, for the combat commander. The other two are located in the section between Bulthauptstrasse and Benquestrasse. In the course of the air raids, the green spaces suffered massive devastation - for example, the multi-storey parking lot and the tall observation tower in Bürgerpark, which was donated by Franz Ernst Schütte, were destroyed. The former was rebuilt as a park hotel in 1956.

=== City forest ===
At a meeting on July 6, 1906, the committee and board of the Bürgerparkverein decided to submit an application to the Senate with the request that the trapezoidal area north of the railroad line up to Wetterungsweg - the so-called Bürgerweidekämpe - be transferred to the association for the creation of a city forest. The park director at the time, Carl Ohrt, was responsible for the garden design, and the businessman and chairman of the Bürgerparkverein, Franz Schütte, agreed to provide 100,000 gold marks from his private assets to cover the costs. In July, the members of the association approved the request at an extraordinary general meeting, which was then sent immediately. On September 14, the Senate announced its approval:

[...] The Senate believes that, despite the not inconsiderable loss of rent in view of the undeniable advantage that will accrue to the entire population of Bremen through the creation of a city forest, the Bürgerparkverein's application should not be denied approval. It warmly welcomes the action of the Bürgerparkverein in the interests of Bremen, it is of the opinion that the offer of the association's friend, which has made its action possible, deserves the warmest thanks, and requests the Bürgerschaft to unite with the resolution that the desired area be transferred to the Bürgerparkverein as soon as possible under the same conditions as those laid down for the Bürgerpark.

In October of the same year, two locomobiles and a steam plough with an associated water tank wagon, which had been borrowed from the Oldenburg forestry administration, were used in the course of the initial work. The silty clay soil over fenland with locally heavy groundwater had to be ploughed up to 70 centimetres deep at first. As the high groundwater level prevented the formation of a wide root network, the trees were planted extremely close together so that they could support each other. A total of 525,000 deciduous and coniferous tree seedlings, 75,000 coppice seedlings and 1,940 avenue trees were planted over an area of 265 acres. Avenues with a total length of 5,270 meters were created, and the excavation of the Kleiner Stadtwaldsee lake made it possible to build a seven-meter-high mound on its banks. On both the east and west sides, a conifer conservation area was created and the forest opened up into four small, scattered clearings with sunbathing lawns. The footpaths were designed in grass form, giving them a carpet-like appearance and requiring considerably lower maintenance costs. The most remarkable feature, however, were two large avenues. The north–south axis ran dead straight for a length of almost 600 meters, and the slightly curved west–east transversal was 20 meters wide and had two rows of trees on either side. The forest hut was built at the intersection of the two routes in the middle of the city forest. In May 1908, after less than two years of construction, the board of the association announced the completion of the redesign at a general meeting. In the end, the costs had more than doubled and Schütte paid 250,000 gold marks.

After the First World War, the city forest resembled a neglected grove with no maintenance, which is why external experts suggested to park director Hugo Riggers that all the trees should be cut down, as it would be impossible to restore order there. Riggers, however, decided against this radical measure; instead, he raised the paths, thinned out the tree population and helped the city forest to regain its popularity. In 1962 and 1972, hurricanes caused sometimes severe devastation. The storms had good opportunities to attack the thin, weak trunks and sparsely developed crowns of the trees due to the poor soil conditions. In 1972 alone, 1,730 trees broke - mainly on the eastern side of the city forest in a conifer plantation - more than twice as many as in the entire Bürgerpark.

At the beginning of April 1971, the Kleine Stadtwaldsee was in danger of drying out when the water level dropped rapidly. On April 2, a large-scale operation was carried out by nature lovers, members of the Bürgerparkverein and animal rights activists, who used inflatable boats and landing nets to rescue pike and other fish species. The reason for the drought was the construction work on the new university. The former marshland meadows were filled with sand, which required large quantities of water. This led to a rapid lowering of the groundwater level in the area. With the help of a quickly laid pipeline and a pump, the lake in the city forest could be refilled. While the Bürgerpark still barely deviates from Benque's plans today, the face of the city forest has changed considerably over the years. The initially designed avenues have given way to meadow views and the western conifer grove to a clearing. The forest hut no longer exists either.

== Appearance ==
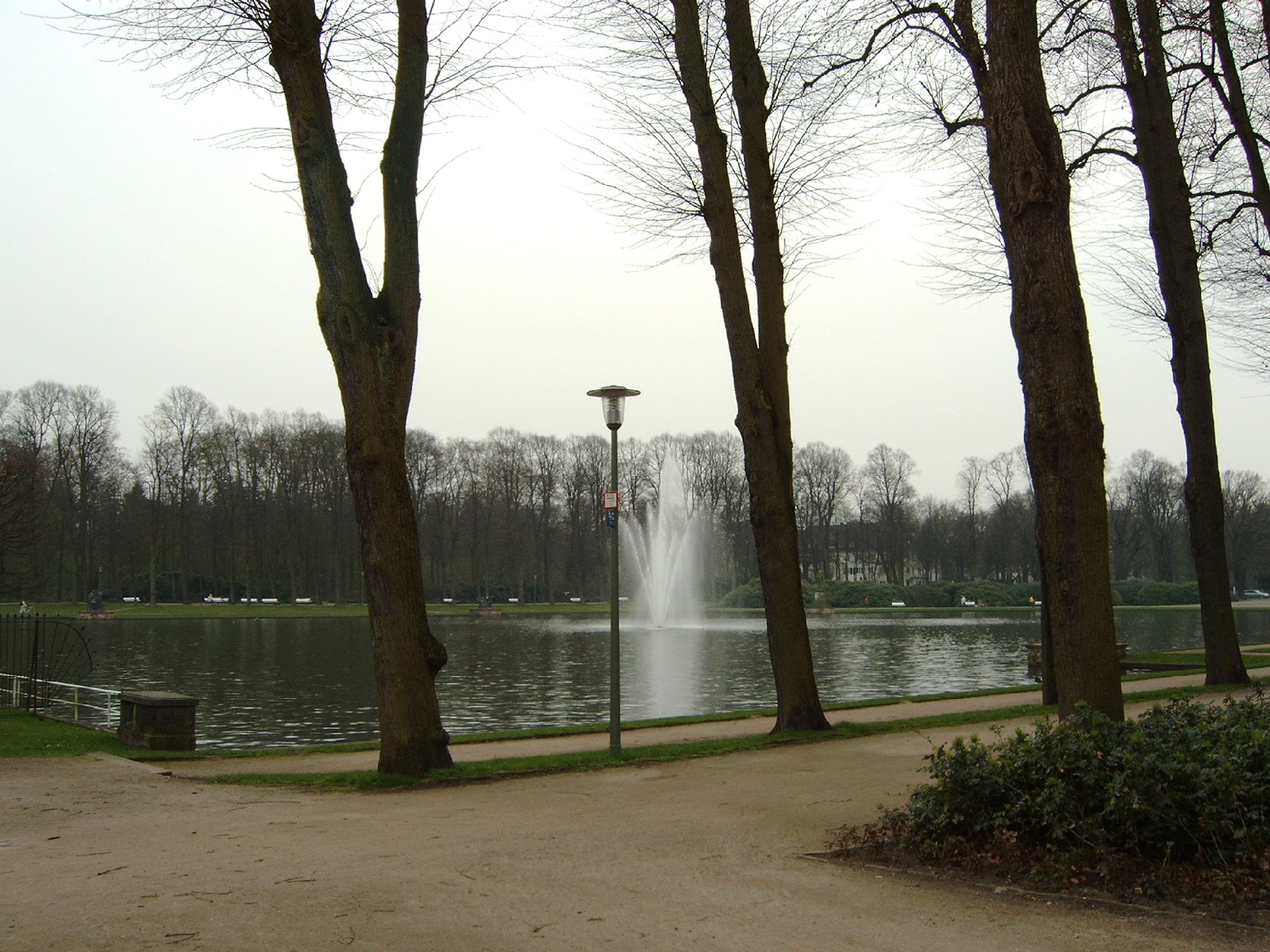
A small section of the Hollersee with the fountain

Bürgerpark and Stadtwald have a combined area of 202.5 hectares. The Bürgerpark accounts for 136 of this and the latter for 66.5. Together, they are among the largest inner-city parks in Germany after the Englischer Garten in Munich, the Großer Tiergarten in Berlin and the Altonaer Volkspark in Hamburg. The green corridor has a total length of up to 2.56 kilometers, the width varies between 0.6 and 1.17 kilometers. 142 hectares (a good 70 percent of the total area) are planted with trees, 30 hectares (15 percent) are lawns and other grass areas and 15 hectares (7.5 percent) are water areas. The park is dominated by five large lakes. In the north-eastern corner of the city forest is the 2,500 square meter, three-part Small City Forest Lake. In the south-eastern corner of the Bürgerpark is the Schwanensee lake and, in a central location, the artificially bordered Hollersee lake in front of the Parkhotel. The latter is equipped with a high fountain in the summer months. To the north, in the western part of the park, is the Emmasee, on the banks of which there is a well-known coffee house and where rowing boats can be hired. These can be used to navigate the extensive central watercourse of the Bürgerpark, which flows in a ring through the entire section of the park between the railroad line and the footpath that crosses it. Included in this circle of water is the Meiereisee lake next to the Meierei restaurant. From here, Bremen's longest visual axis (2.9 kilometers) stretches across the adjoining meadowland to the south, the large park meadow and the Parkhotel all the way to Bremen Cathedral. While the watercourses run irregularly in the Bürgerpark, they flow relatively parallel in a checkerboard pattern in the Stadtwald. The Stadtwaldgraben runs along the entire eastern side of the Stadtwald and is its largest stream. Numerous bridges, some of them elaborately decorated, cross the watercourses in both parks. They are either named after their founders (Alfred-Hoffmann-Brücke, Aselmeyerbrücken, Carl-Schütte-Brücke, Hachezbrücke, Hoffmann-Brücke, Marie-Bergmann-Brücke, Melchersbrücke from 1881/82, Schüttebrücke, Wiegandbrücke, Fritz-Hollweg-Brücke) or commemorate well-known Bremen personalities (Lambert-Leisewitz-Brücke).

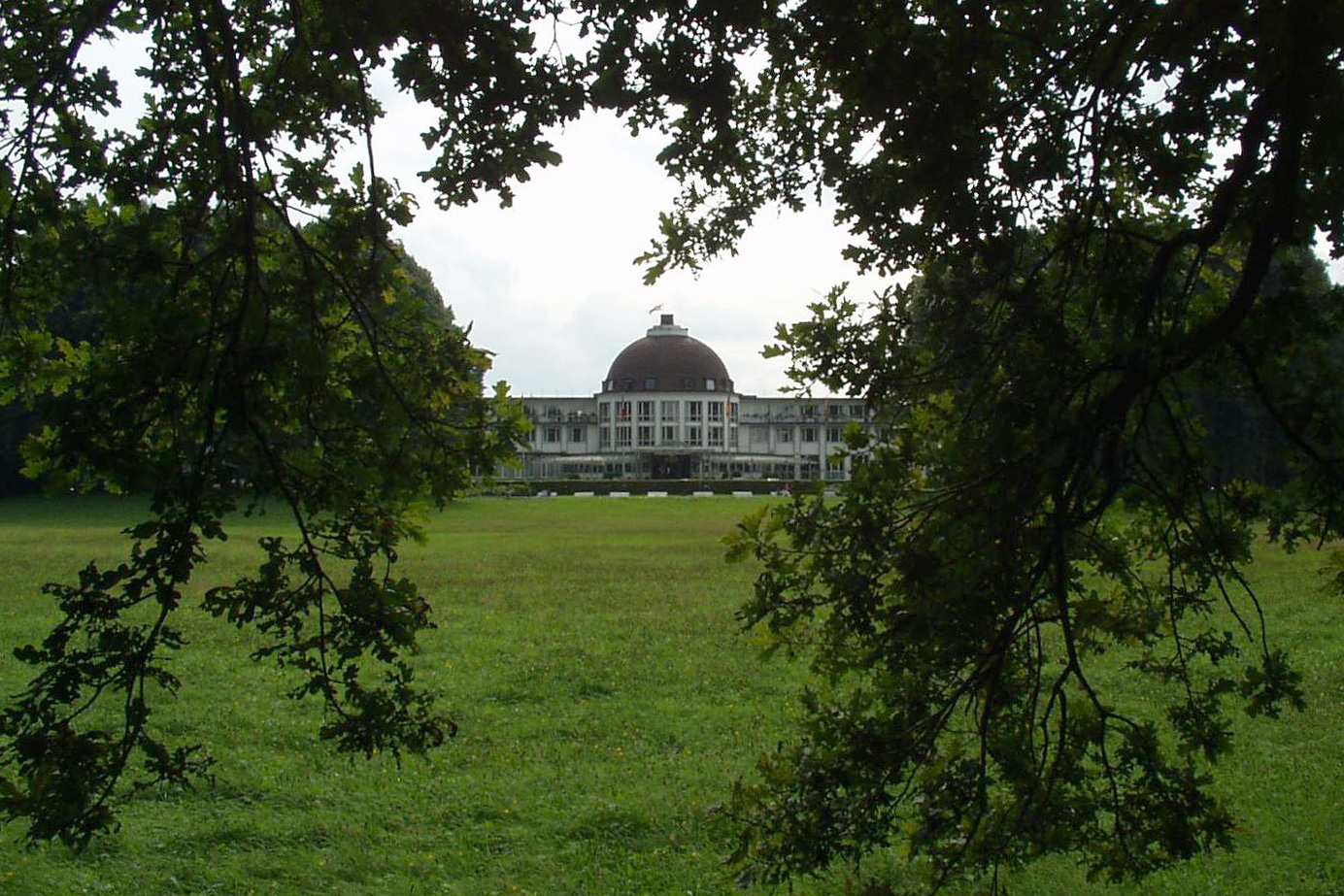
View in a southerly direction of the large park meadow and the Parkhotel

The city forest and Bürgerpark are fully developed and criss-crossed by a dense network of paths. The footpaths have a total length of 31.5 kilometers, the cycle paths are 14 kilometers long and the roads are 7.3 kilometers long. In addition, since 19 November 1977 there has been a 1,667-metre-long finned track in the southern section of the city forest just above the railroad line, which is floodlit in the dark. This was last revised in 2004 in cooperation with the Bremen Institute for Applied Prevention and Performance Diagnostics. During these measures, the track was widened to 1.5 meters and raised by 30 centimetres to improve water drainage. The Bürgerparkverein also created a nature and adventure trail in the Stadtpark in 2000 on the initiative of the Bremen State Hunting Association. In addition to a mini-golf course at Emmasee and a boules court, there are five playgrounds within the park boundaries - four in the Bürgerpark and one in the city forest, some of which are designed as large adventure playgrounds. There is also a toboggan hill in a clearing in the western third of the city forest.

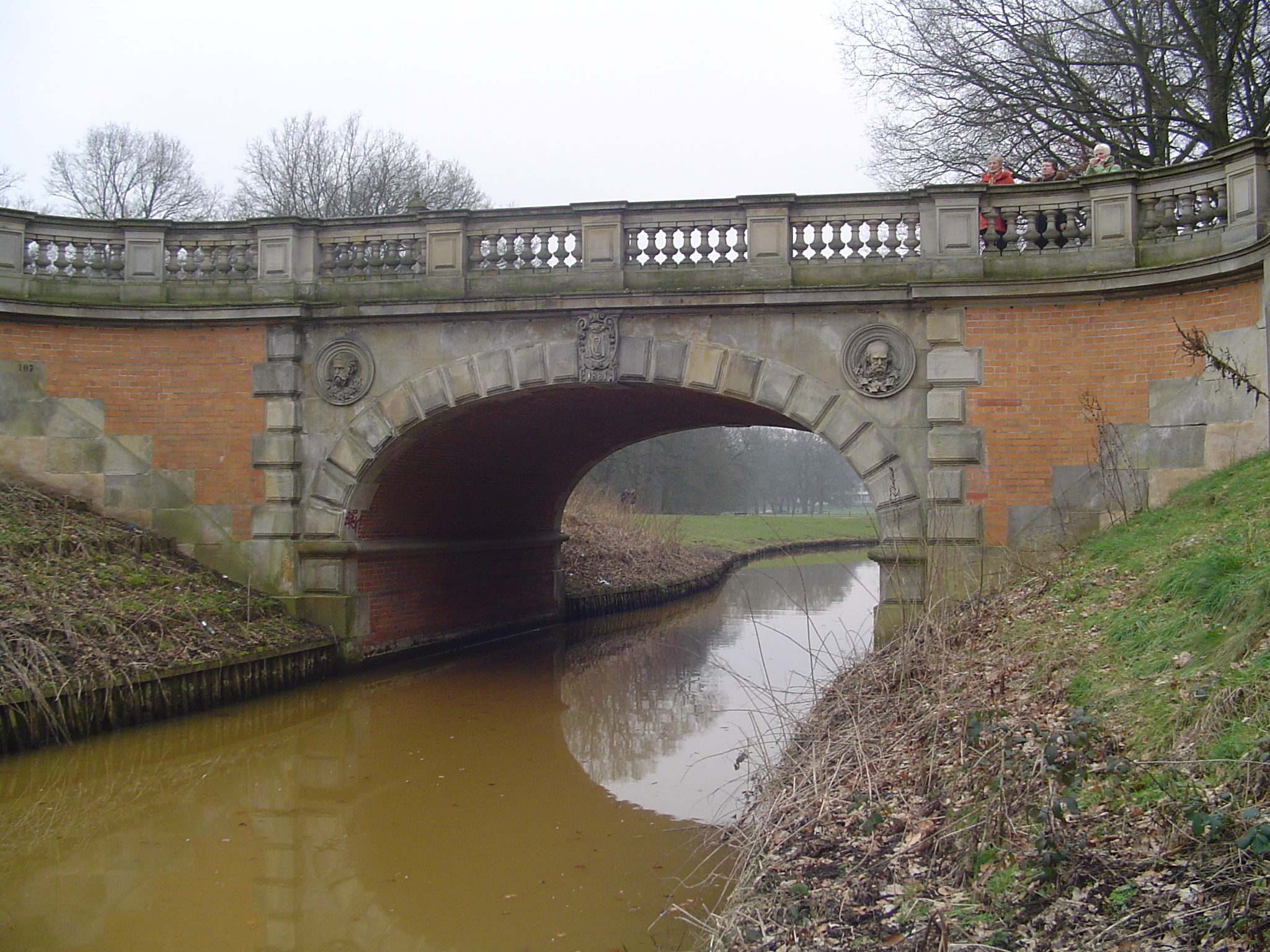
The Melchers Bridge

A special feature of the park is the different horticultural landscapes within the park structure. Probably the best known is the oak grove in the middle-eastern section of the Bürgerpark. It goes back to an initiative of the park director Carl Ohrt, who, in consultation with Benque, had a unique collection of 105 different oak species planted at this location in 1884. When arranging and grouping the trees, attention was paid not only to the shape of the leaves but also to the geographical distribution and the autumn colors in order to create a harmonious picture. Today, around 20 oak species can still be found in the oak grove. Further south, on the south bank of the swan pond, is the spruce grove, a pinetum in which Ohrt - again following Benque's concept - had many coniferous species planted. This is one of only three spots in both parks where mainly conifers grow; otherwise, a wide variety of deciduous trees dominate, grouped according to main tree species as determined by Benque. Miesegaeshain is the name given to a small grouping of oaks on the large park meadow, which was donated by August Friedrich Miesegaes. An ornate zinc pavilion had previously been built on the same site in 1880, which was presumably demolished in the course of the "metal donation" of 1942. Benque planned the so-called "beech view" from the swan pond to the north along the east side of the Schweizerhaushof with the idea of the typical "Thuringian landscapes" as a representation of a "lush meadow valley". The lawns in this area are surrounded by mighty beech trees.

Both parks were designed in the style of the popular public gardens typical of expanding cities at the time, which is why Wilhelm Benque and his colleagues were keen to harmonize different garden architectural directions and styles and create a harmonious park. For example, the Meierei or the Parkhotel and Hollersee areas feature strictly geometric and symmetrical designs with straight flowerbeds and curved paths, while in other places, winding paths lead through seemingly wild nature. The partially hidden ditches, lakes and watercourses serve to irrigate and drain the park and are intended to give visitors the opportunity to gain new, unusual impressions and insights into the green space from the water side.

=== Monuments ===
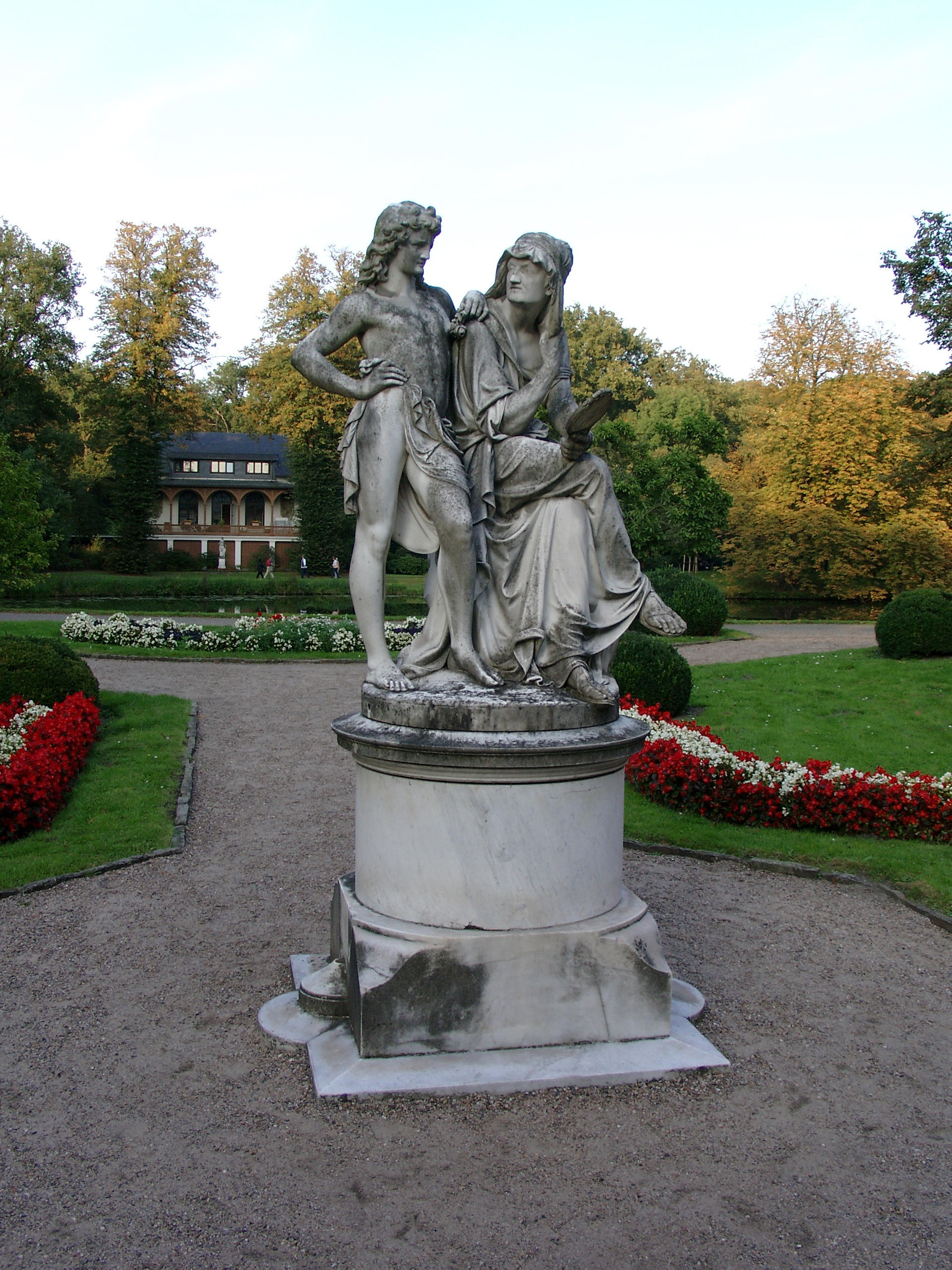
Young man and goddess of fate in the Meierei courtyard

Scattered throughout the park are a wide variety of sculptures, statues, memorials, busts and monuments. They are located almost exclusively in the Bürgerpark.

The more unusual gems include:

- The donor sculpture, a bronze sculpture with floral elements, which the Bürgerparkverein has erected as a sign of thanks to all donors and supporters.
- The stone gorilla bust, which stands in a pavilion by the animal enclosure.

Dausch sculptures: The sculptor Constantin Dausch designed no less than three portraits. In 1875, following a commission from the Bremen merchant H. Lamotte, he created Siegfried fighting the dragon from Carrara marble on a round stone plinth in the Italian capital Rome. In Bremen, the work was converted into a fountain during the Northwest German Trade and Industrial Exhibition in 1890 and presented to the Bürgerparkverein by Lamotte's wife. Today, Siegfried the Dragon Slayer stands on the west side of the Parkhotel. Dausch created the marble Musica in 1877 and, like the cityscape Jüngling und Schicksalsgöttin (Youth and Goddess of Fate), which was created a year later, it was initially placed in the park of Schloss Mühlenthal St. Magnus before being moved to the Meiereivilla in 1933. The two-figure work from 1878 has also stood just 100 meters away in the Meierei garden since 1933.

Hollersee is flanked by several statues, each of which stands at the corners of its shore.

- Music and dance: made of marble as idealized personifications by Diedrich Kropp from 1885.
- The sculpture ensemble Four Seasons (1991) with the four sculptures Spring, Summer, Autumn and Winter at Hollersee was created by Bernd Altenstein and was erected to mark the 125th anniversary of the Bürgerpark.

Works by Theodor Georgii: In 1909 and 1910, Eduart Schrodt's legacy was used to erect the sculptures African Waterbuck and Noble Deer on the east side of what was then the multi-storey parking lot and is now the Parkhotel. Both figures have a base made of shell limestone and are made of bronze according to designs by Theodor Georgii.

Loans from the Kunstverein: In 1972, the non-profit Kunstverein in Bremen, which sponsors the Kunsthalle, gave the Bürgerparkverein two permanent loans. The Amphytrite by Kurt Edzard and the Poseidon by Ernesto de Fiori, both of which were originally made for a North German Lloyd passenger steamer in 1929, were added to the park. Both bronze statues now stand in the garden of the coffee house on Emmasee.

Hermann Löns Stone: In the early 1930s, hunters, nature lovers and enthusiasts of the writings of the local poet Hermann Löns, who died in the First World War, organized a fundraising campaign for a memorial. In 1933, a simple memorial stone with the inscription "Löns" was made from a boulder found near Nienburg. This Hermann Löns stone was donated to the Bürgerparkverein by the Bremer Jägervereinigung e. V. (Bremen Hunters' Association).

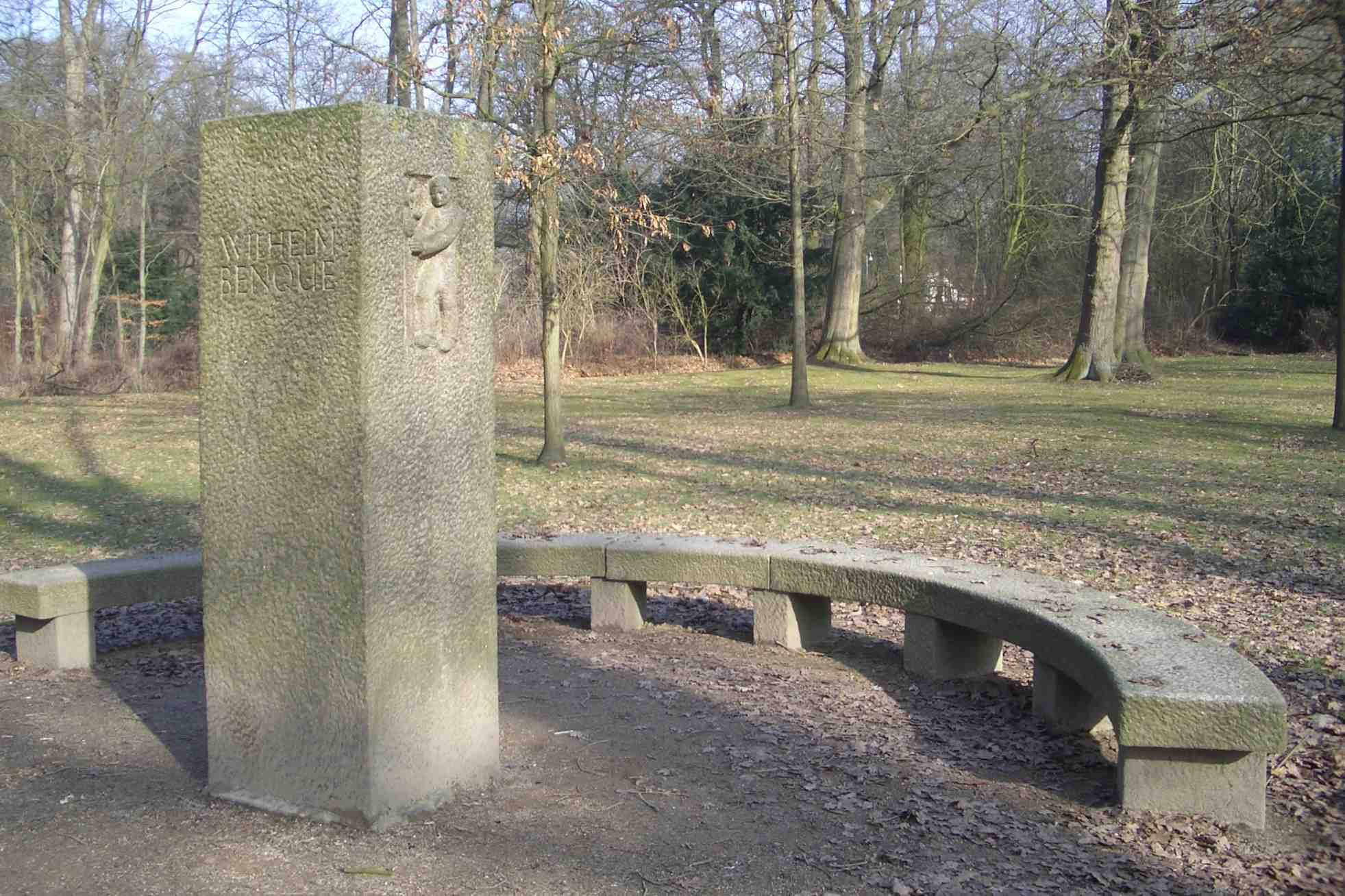
The Benque stone

Bust of Schütte: After his death, a committee collected donations for a monument in memory of Franz Ernst Schütte, the chairman of the Bürgerparkverein and greatest patron of the parks, who died in 1911 and had rendered outstanding services to the Bürgerpark and the city forest. In 1913, the mayor at the time and Schütte's successor as president of the association, Carl Georg Barkhausen, was able to unveil the marble bust of Schütte created by Adolf von Hildebrand. The inscription reads "Franz Schütte dedicated to the highly deserving fellow citizen by his friends MDCCCCXIII". Forty years after its erection, the bust was replaced by a copy in 1953 for safety reasons. The original was given a place in the Kunsthalle and, since 1989, in the Meierei.

Benque memorial: The leading landscape gardener, garden architect and long-time park director Wilhelm Benque is also commemorated. He had spoken out against any tribute during his lifetime, so it was not until 42 years after his death that the architect Eduard Gildemeister proposed the creation of a memorial in 1937. The Bremen-born sculptor and director of the Nordic College of Art in Bremen, Ernst Gorsemann, was responsible for the design. The Benquestein in the oak grove, a simple granite block from the Fichtelgebirge, is surrounded by a semi-circular low bench of the same material and bears the inscription "Wilhelm " and two reliefs of a digging and a planting worker, symbolizing the activities in the park.

=== Benches ===
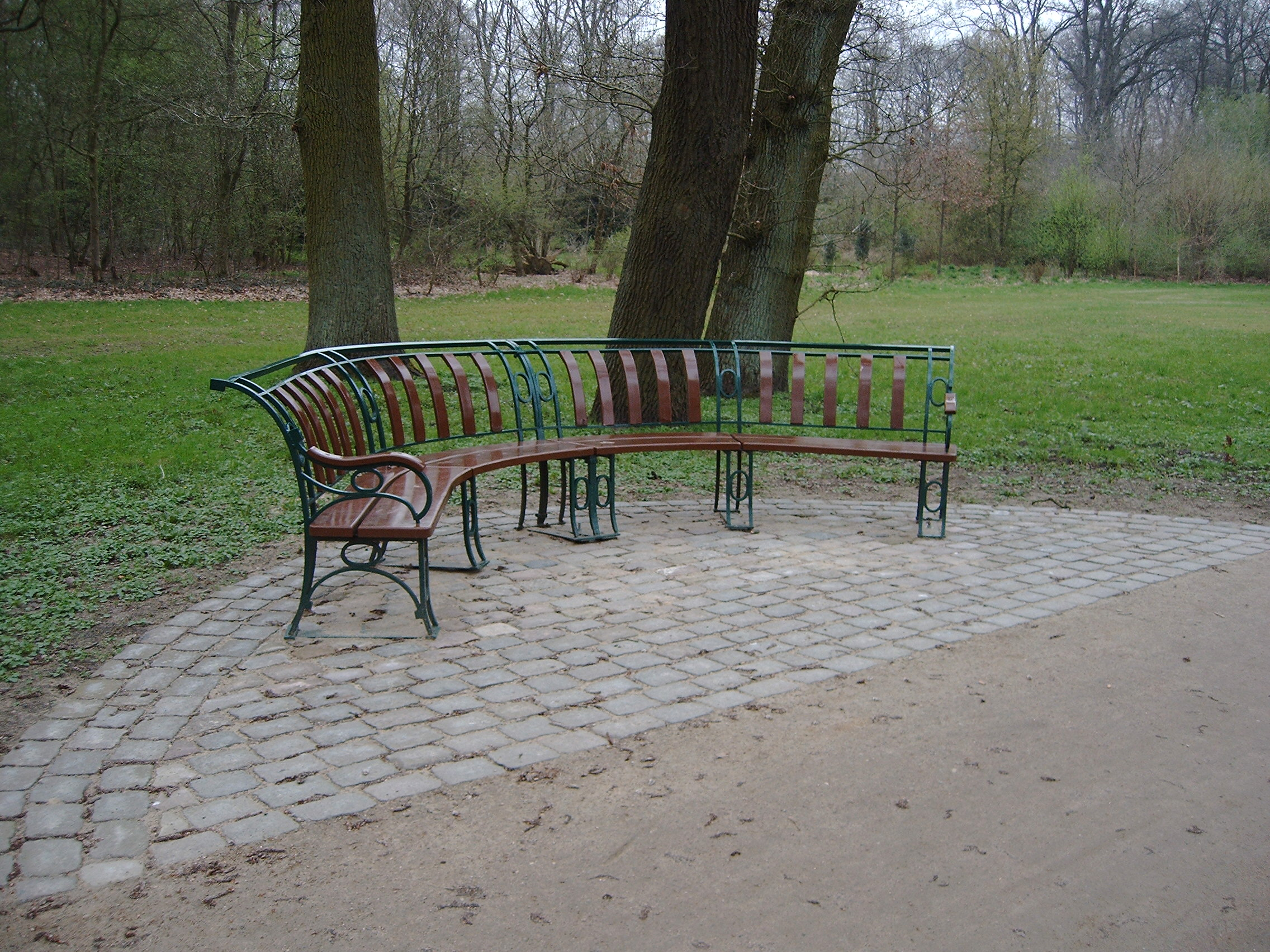
The Amelie Ziermann bench

The numerous artistically crafted benches in the Bürgerpark and the city forest, which exist alongside the normal seating, should be highlighted as special design elements. Almost all of them are the result of private donations and often bear the name of the donor or the person they are intended to commemorate.

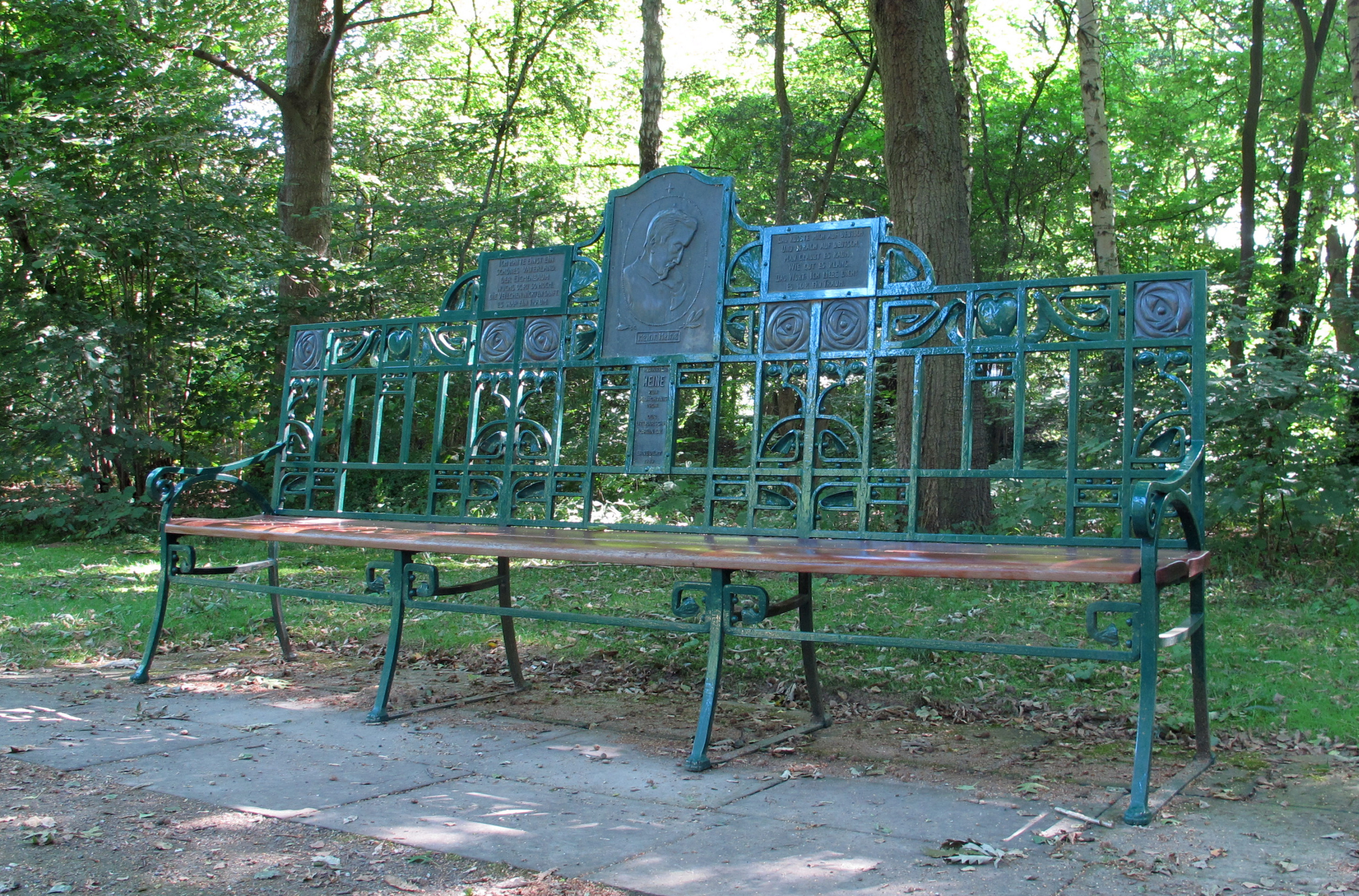
Heine Bank (a copy from 1989)

In addition to these six benches, there are others that were not made by Leidenberg. mini|Heine bench (a copy from 1989)

- The best known of these is the relatively small wrought-iron Heine bench in Art Nouveau style. It stands as a memorial to Heinrich Heine in the oak grove and goes back to ideas put forward by the Bremen Literary Association in 1902 to erect a monument to the famous writer. These plans were realized in 1904 according to the designs of Hans Lassen. Initially, the bench bore a large relief portrait medallion of Heine (sculptor: Hugo Berwald) in the middle of the backrest as well as two flanking small bronze text panels with verses of poetry. After the end of the First World War, however, the large plaque was desecrated by anti-Semites who stole it. It was repaired in 1924 before park director Hugo Riggers was forced to hide all three plaques in 1933 when the National Socialists came to power. During the Allied air raids, the bench was destroyed by bombs. In 1969, the slabs were attached to a stone bench before the restoration of the Heine bench to its original form was celebrated in 1989. The Heine bench was missing from Bürgerpark in 2010 as it was part of Bremen's stand at Expo 2010 in Shanghai.
- The Emma bench on the western shore of Lake Emma, which was made of sandstone in 1868 to designs by Heinrich Müller, looks more like a monument than a bench, as it consists of a large memorial stone and just two small seats flanking it. The inscription commemorates the start of construction work on the Bürgerweide forest, the legendary Emma von Lesum and Bremen's Bishop Hartwig I von Stade, who confirmed ownership of the Bürgerweide in a document issued by the city in 1159. The bench also bears the motto of the Bürgerpark "For lord and servant, man, woman and child. For the benefit and joy of all time". A notch in the stone also refers to the double flood of 1880/1881, the worst flooding the park has experienced to date. In 1966, the bench underwent a minor relocation.
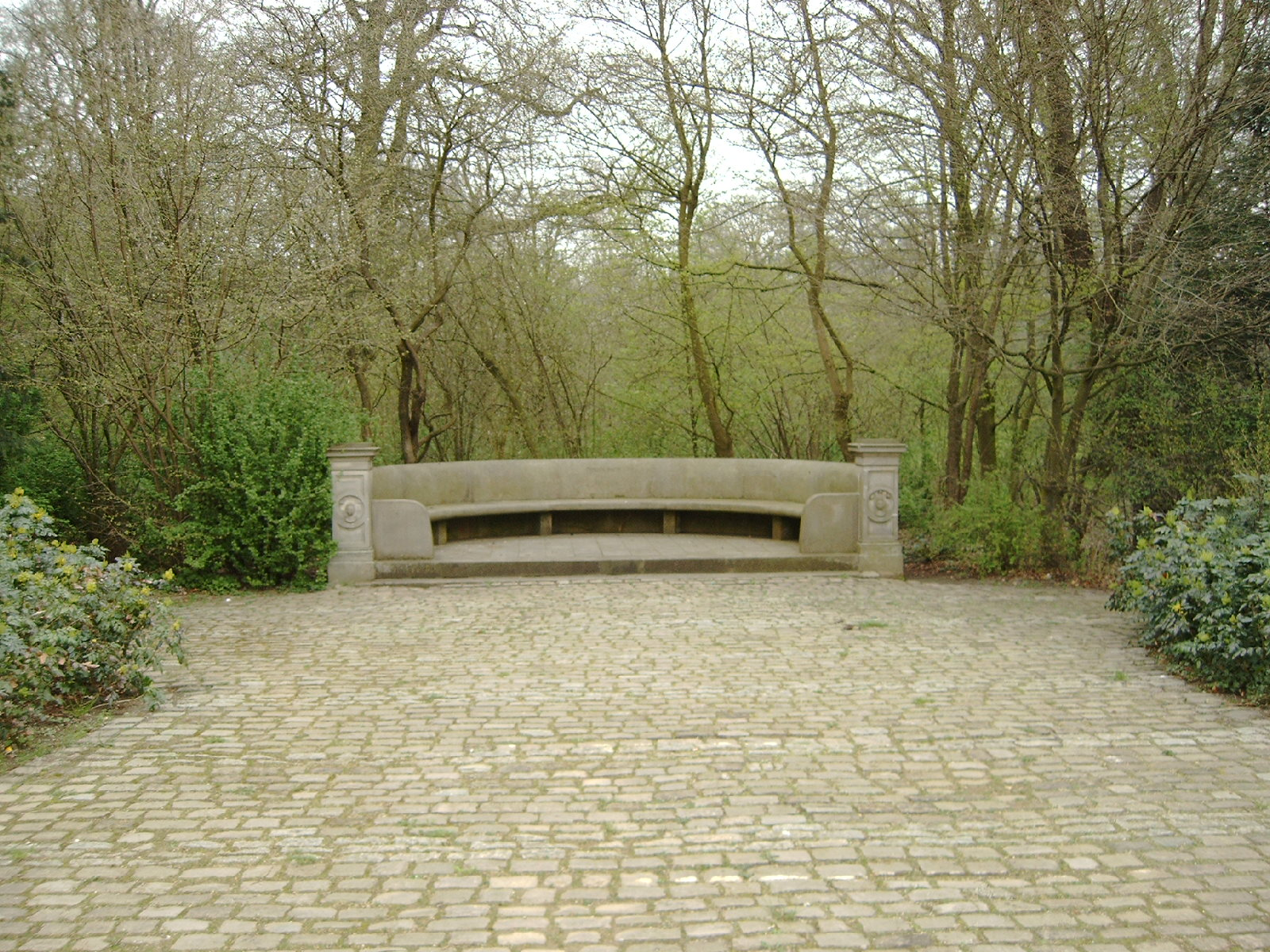
  The Hollerbank
- The semi-circular Holler bench made of sandstone was designed by architects Müller and Runge in 1869 to commemorate Johann Hermann Holler, who had died a year earlier and whose ideas had a significant influence on the creation of the Bürgerpark. The bench is located by the Marcusbrunnen fountain.
- The so-called Roman bench made of sandstone was designed in 1898 by the director of the Bremen Trade Museum, August Töpfer. It forms a semicircle and is stylistically based on the formal language of antiquity. The initials M. S. refer to the donor Meta Schütte.
- Near the Wiegand Bridge is the stone Bulthaupt bench from 1909, with a bronze portrait plaque commemorating the poet and writer Heinrich Bulthaupt, who is said to have been a frequent visitor to this spot.
- The massive stone Primavesi bench, also known as the "Idas and Mariannenruhe", was designed by building councillor Hugo Weber in 1912. This seat was destroyed during the Second World War and rebuilt in 1969
- Very similar in design to the Hollerbank is the Wolrabbank, also known as the "Ruheleben". It was donated by Elise Wolrab in 1914 in memory of her deceased brother Carl. While the bench was initially flanked by two stone figures in the form of a child and an animal sculpture, these were later removed due to frequent damage.
- Anna's Rest is a small bench with stone cheeks and a wooden seat that was donated by two siblings in 1915 in memory of a deceased sister.
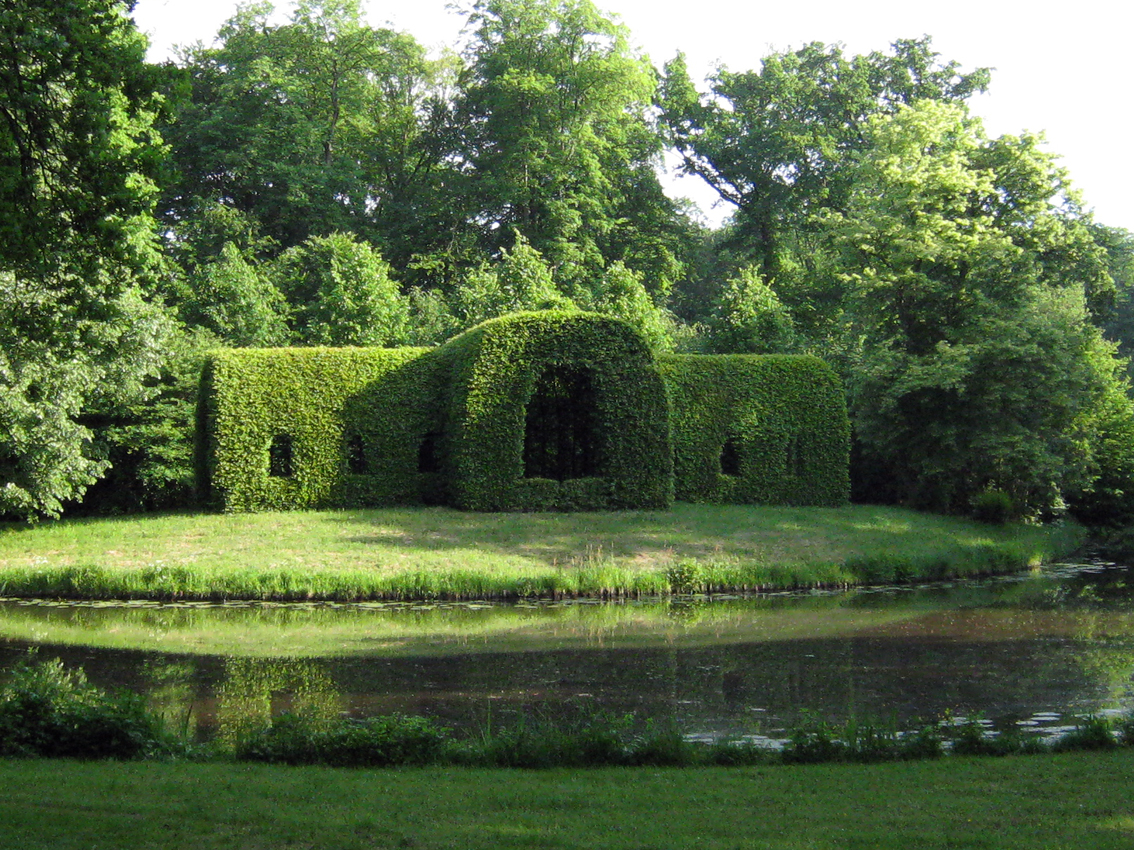
Hornbeam arbor

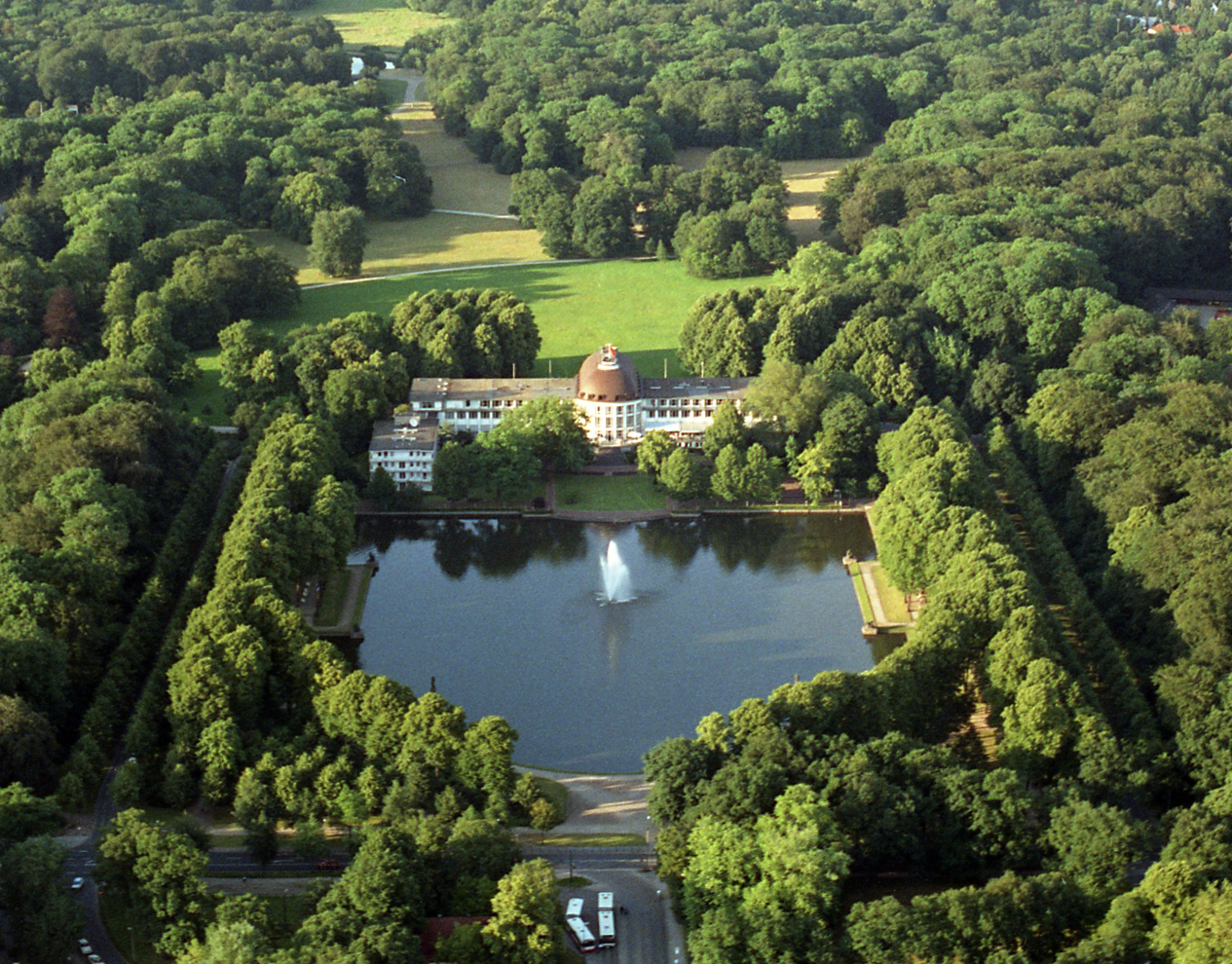
Aerial view

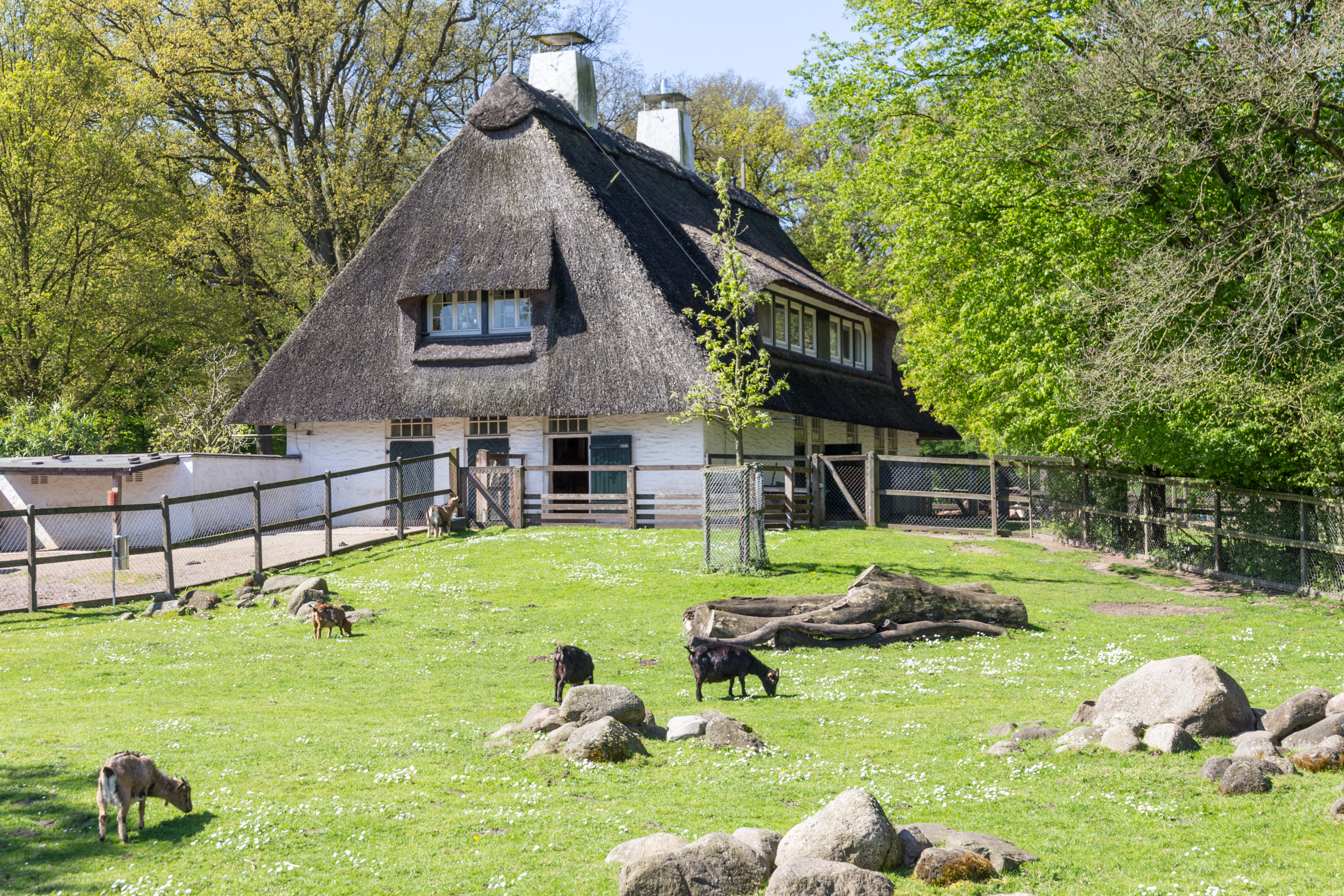
Animal enclosure in the Bürgerpark

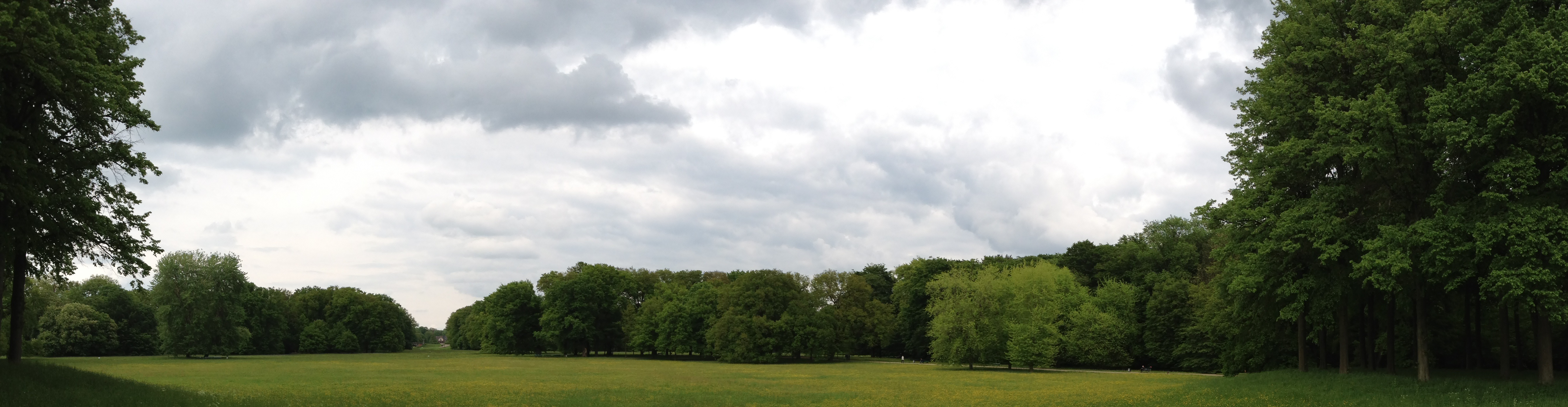
Panorama

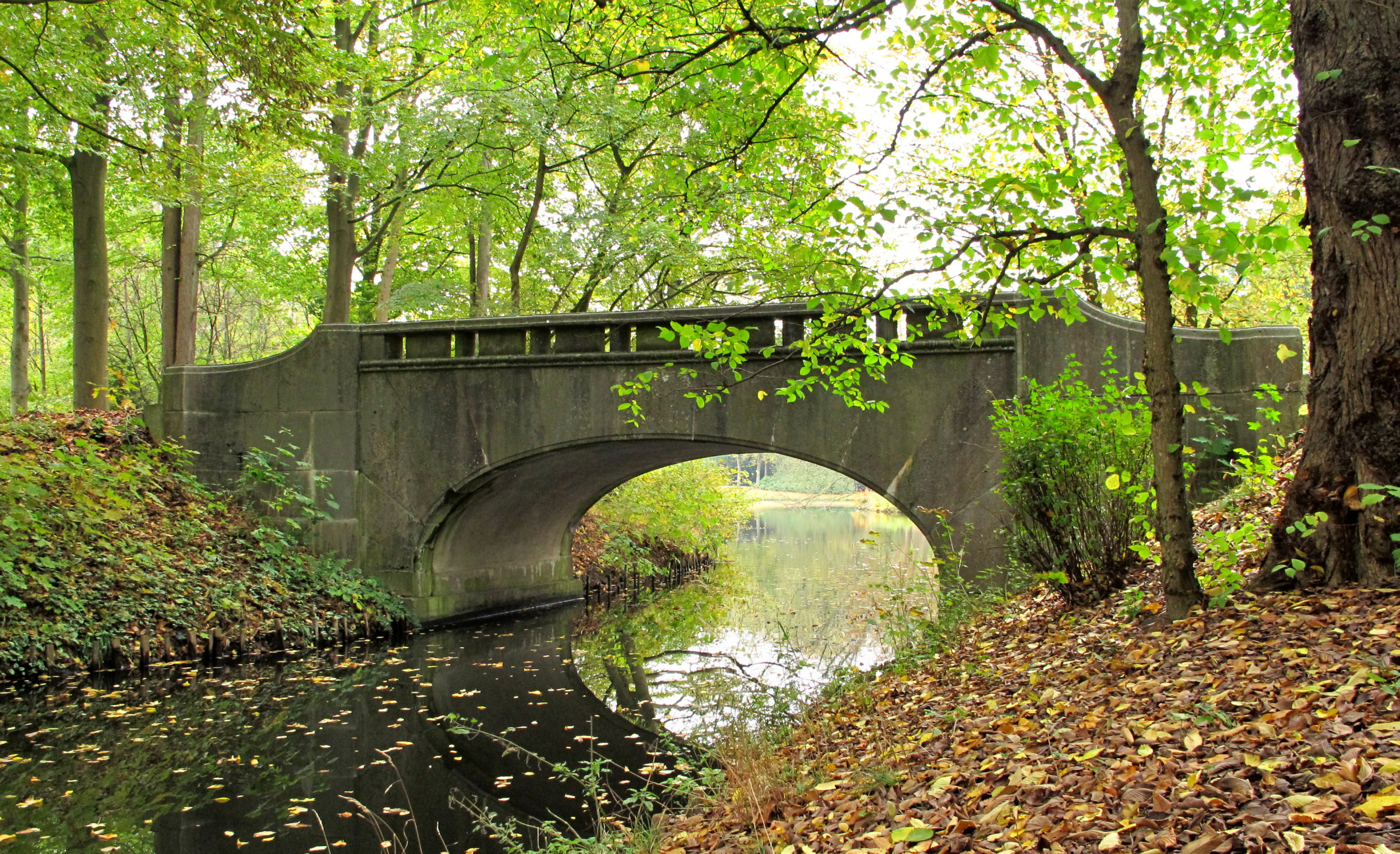
Lambert-Leisewitz Bridge

=== Animal enclosure ===
One of the main attractions of the park is the animal enclosure surrounded by watercourses and large lawns in the middle section of the Bürgerpark. It has existed in various forms since 1869, when a basin for otters was created, which existed until 1886. Small zoological presentations were common in many public parks during the 19th century to entertain visitors. However, otters, as nocturnal creatures, were very shy, which is why an enclosure with a stable for reindeer and deer was built in 1871, which was given a wooden superstructure a year later. This made it possible to keep native, diurnal animals that could tolerate the sometimes adverse weather conditions. In 1874, another game stable was built in the former beech grove, which was moved to the western part of the Bürgerpark in 1884. In 1903, this was replaced by a new building with a square and a round tower, which had a birch framework visible from the outside and formed the center of a large enclosure with many animal species. In the meantime, attempts were made to keep exotic animals in order to increase the attraction, but it soon became clear that the costs were too high. Nevertheless, kangaroos lived in the Bürgerpark for decades and multiplied in large numbers. After the Second World War, the dromedary "Bobby" became a public favorite and in 1954 a new building was erected, which today also houses the gamekeeper's apartment. Fallow deer and sika deer have been living in the enclosures since 1966. In addition, most of the animals kept here today are native species; as well as grey mountain goats, domestic sheep and ducks, there are also Bentheim pigs, wild boars, geese, domestic donkeys, alpacas, mouflons, peacocks and guinea pigs.

== Bauten ==
=== Gebäude ===
In addition to the extensive green spaces, woods, meadows and streams of the Bürgerpark and the municipal forest, there are also numerous buildings within the park. Some of these are used for recreation or catering for visitors or house the administrative offices. In addition, there are five shelters where hikers and cyclists can take shelter during bad weather. The two largest buildings are located in the immediate vicinity in the southern area of the Bürgerpark. One is the Parkhotel am Hollersee and the other is the Schweizerhaus. The latter was built in 1871 with a donation from the money and exchange broker Heinrich Christian Dieckmann according to plans by Carl Scheinpflug in the "Schweizerhaus style" and initially served as a caretaker's house and office of the Bürgerparkverein. It housed a small apartment, a bureau and a conference room for the association's board. An extension was added in 1881 and a kitchen was added five years later. However, care was taken to preserve the original style. Today, it still serves as the park director's residence and is now part of a larger paved courtyard as part of a seven-part ensemble of buildings, which, however, are grouped together under the name Schweizerhaus.

The Old Shooting House was built by master bricklayer F. Holländer in 1861 on the former military shooting range north of the Ringstrasse. During the expansion of the park in 1874, the property was given to the Bürgerparkverein, which converted it into a warden's house. Today, the house on the easternmost edge of the Bürgerpark serves as an official residence. Another warden's house was built near the south-western entrance to the park in 1901 thanks to a donation of 10,000 gold marks from Elise Köncke. This colorfully designed house is known as the Elise Foundation and has ornate wooden decorations in the Nordic style. Two pavilions in the park grounds are also the result of generous donations. The Norwegian-Swedish consul Hermann S. Gerdes donated one of these structures on May 31, 1903, on the occasion of his 80th birthday. The Gerdes pavilion was designed by the architects Friedrich Wellermann and Paul Frölich as a wooden structure with a slate-covered roof on the beech tree canopy not far from the dairy. Fritz Brandt built the Dyckhoff pavilion in 1963 at a fork in the road between Emmasee and Marcusbrunnen, which the Bremen clothing store H. Dyckhoff had donated two years earlier as a "child protection hut" for its 75th company anniversary. The round building was renovated in 1986 and fitted with a gilded spire. In the north-western corner of the Bürgerpark, between the main watercourse and the railroad line, stands the Wätjenshaus, a country-style house built of bricks with an ornate roof, white plastered wall sections and a rain shelter accessible from the path. Benque had initially planned a shelter for horses and riders on this site. After a donation from the widow of the Bremen merchant and shipowner Diedrich Heinrich Wätjen in 1893, construction began, but a guard's house was built in this area.

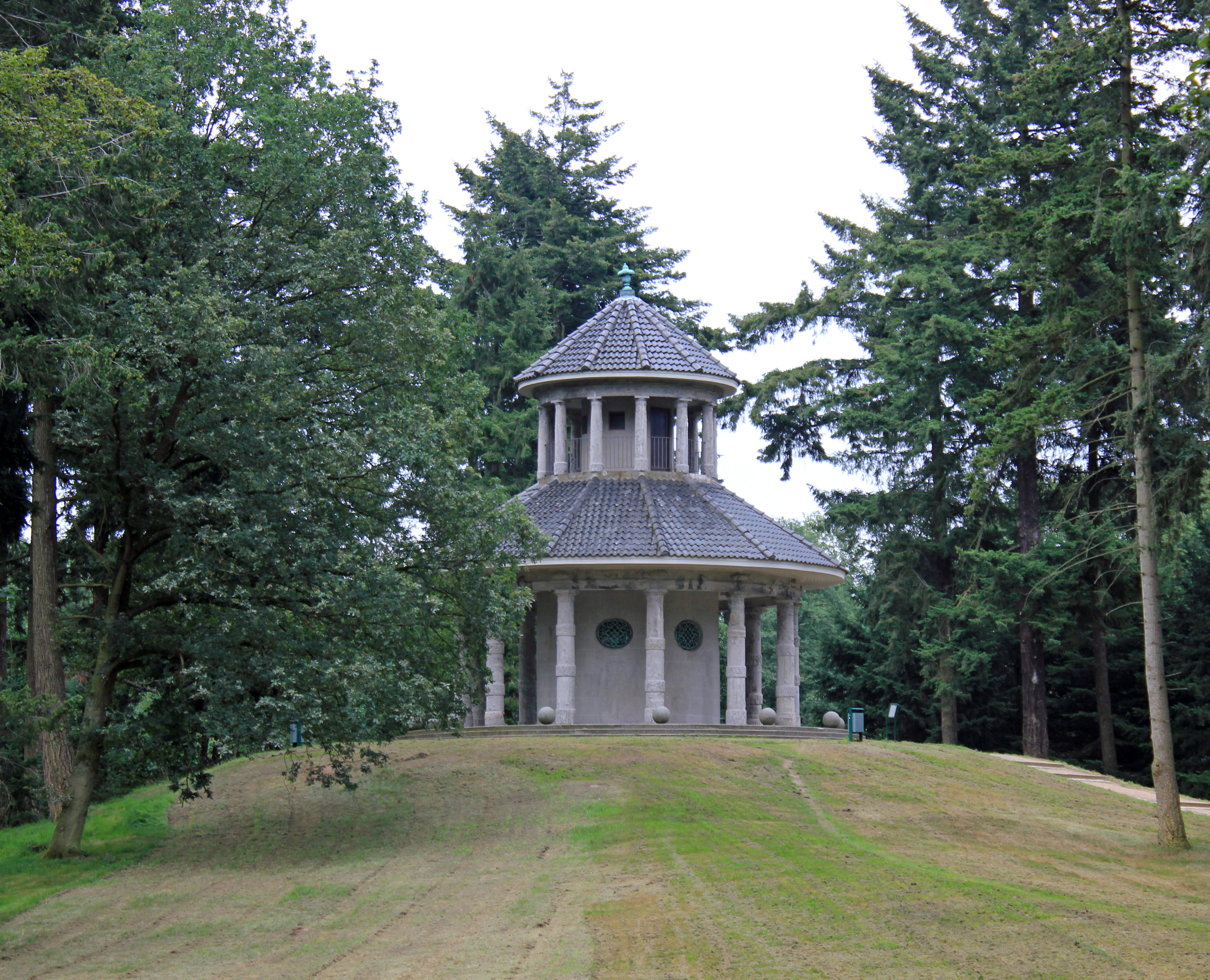
Observation tower on the hill by the Kleiner Stadtwaldsee lake

Two important buildings in the city forest are the warden's house on the eastern edge and the observation tower on the Kleiner Stadtwaldsee lake. The former was donated by Franz Ernst Schütte and was also designed by Wellermann and Frölich as a two-storey, octagonal central building with two side wings, which has a discreet façade with a column-supported monopitch roof facing Parkallee. The building was ready for occupancy in 1908 and was completely renovated between 1996 and 1997. Gabriel von Seidl provided the designs for the observation tower on the hill by the Kleiner Stadtwaldsee and had a tower-like pavilion with a portico built, behind whose oak door a staircase led to the upper platform. From the fall of 1909, the building served as a lookout point and rain shelter, but was closed again immediately afterwards until the summer of 1910, as the view of the newly redesigned park was still considered too unattractive. Soon after its completion, the name "Jewish Temple" became popular for reasons unknown. The tower was repeatedly subjected to vandalism from the outset, which is why the glass windows were replaced with wire ones as early as 1917. In the 1920s, settlement cracks and roof damage had to be repaired and in 1956/1957 the slowly decaying roof was repaired again. As the vandalism continued, the entrance to the tower was bricked up in 1972. Six years later, it was completely restored, but remained inaccessible. In 1984, the observation tower was placed under a preservation order and, with financial support from the Rotary Club Bremen-Weser, it was renovated again in 2004. The entrance door and the glass windows were restored to their original state, but the tower is still only accessible with a guided tour. Despite its exposed location, the tower no longer offers a distant view due to the tall surrounding trees.

==== Forest stage ====
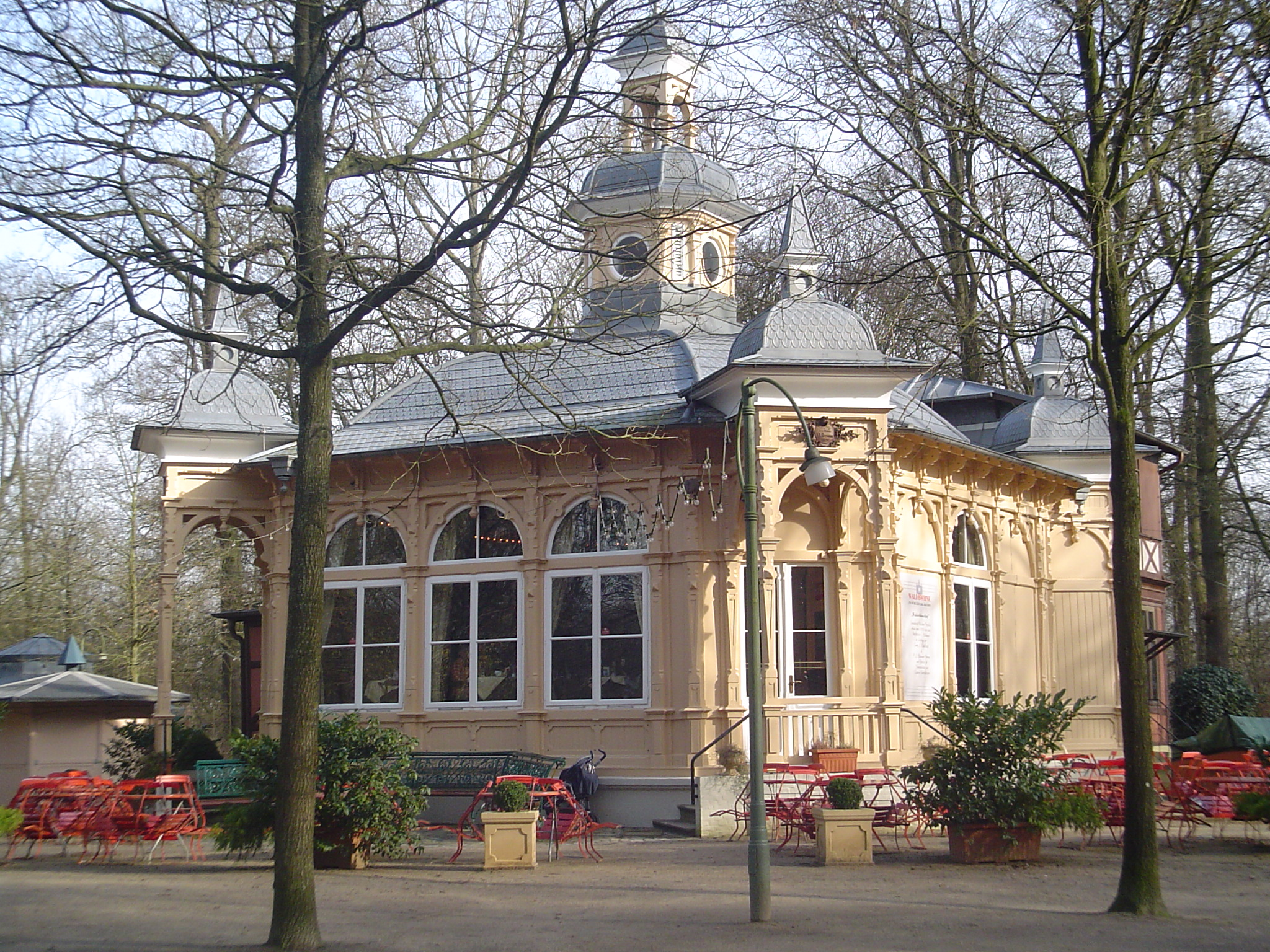
The forest stage

The Waldbühne is the last remaining building from the Trade and Industrial Exhibition of 1890. The wooden structure near the parking garage was built according to designs by architect Carl Bollmann by carpenter J. H. Meyer, joiner Fr. Flathmann and roofer J. Mähl. It served the Bremen cigar company Engelhardt & Biermann as an exhibition pavilion and, according to the original plans, was to be demolished like the other showrooms after the end of the exhibition. However, as no rain shelter or warden's dwelling had been built in the north-eastern corner of the Bürgerpark at that time, the tobacco company decided to donate the pavilion and also covered the costs of moving it to its current location. The restaurant, which opened next to the warden's residence in the small building on July 8, 1891, bore the name Waldschlösschen, which was soon popularly transferred to the little house itself. The Waldbühne survived both world wars without significant damage and was renovated by a brewery in 1966 before the Bürgerparkverein had it extended in 1975 to attract tenants.In 1991, another extensive renovation was carried out with the help of the State Office for the Preservation of Monuments. The richly decorated building was given a slate roof, returning it to its original state. Numerous nostalgic decorative elements can be found in the interior. Since the mid-1970s, the Waldbühne has been a popular meeting place in the parks. It houses a restaurant with a large garden and a stage where numerous concerts are held all year round, with a focus on jazz. In summer, a jazz morning pint is held on an outdoor stage on Sunday mornings.

==== The Meierei ====
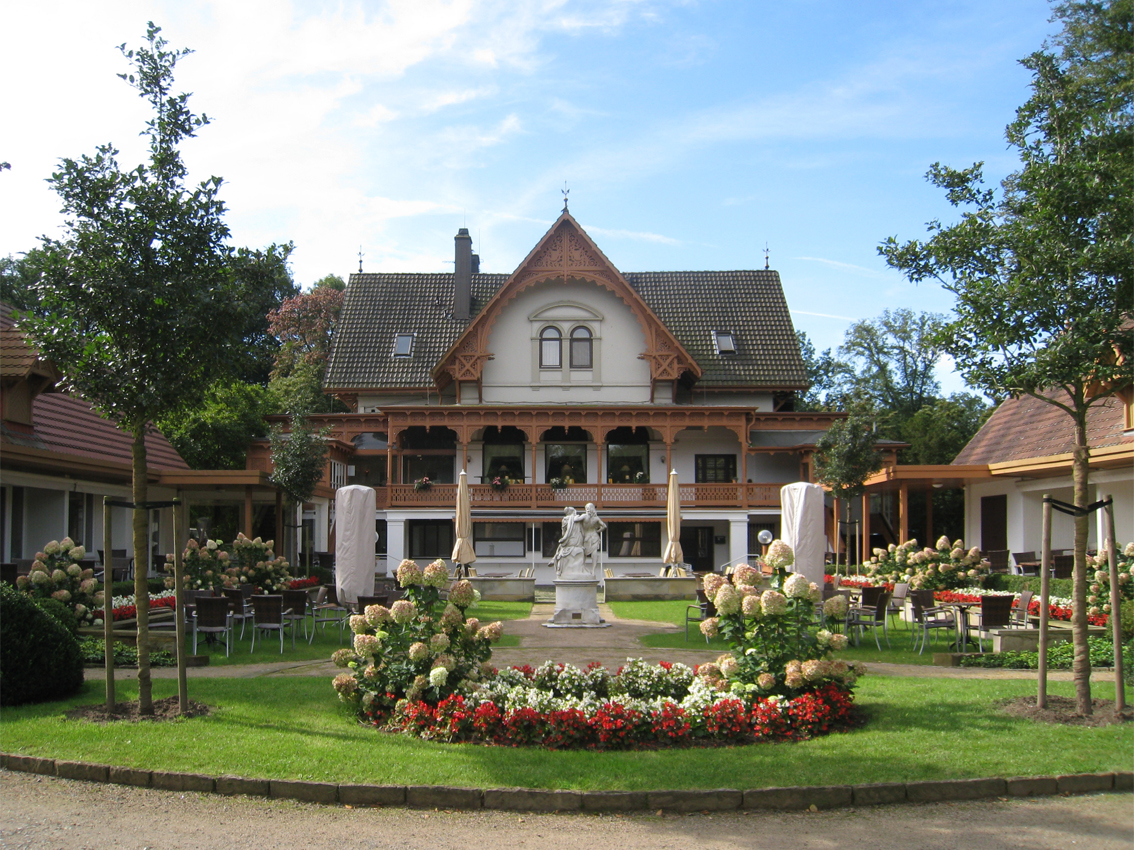
The dairy

The Meierei (dairy farm) is located at the centre of the park, on the southern bank of a small lake (the Meiereisee). First built as a dairy in the 19th century, it is now a well-known location for excursions and events. Its almost 400-metre-long access road from Parkallee is the only public path in the two parks on which motor vehicles are permitted. In 1879, a small dairy was built on the site with twelve dairy cows grazing on the surrounding meadows. Just two years later, the current "Swiss-style" building with several verandas was built with a donation from Schütte and according to plans by Heinrich Müller. The inner courtyard, bordered by a stable for 36 cows and a coach house, was transformed into a garden with flowerbeds and a dovecote. The dairy now also served as a restaurant and also sold the manufactured products, such as milk, butter, layered cheese, whipped cream and yoghurt. The basement of the building housed the kitchen, dairy rooms and cheese dairy, while the mezzanine floor was home to the guest rooms, the large central hall and a ladies' and gentlemen's room at each side. Servants' rooms and the tenant's apartment were located on the top floor.

To increase the attractiveness and make the business more profitable, a boat rental with a water train was built on the Meiereisee in 1883 and a monkey cage in 1886. With its culinary offerings, musical performances and mineral water cures, the Meierei soon became a well-known address. However, the stables had to be abandoned in 1900 after increasing complaints from guests and for reasons of hygiene. Initially, there were plans to relocate them, but the necessary financial resources were lacking for this measure, so dairy farming came to an end. Five years later, the dovecote in the garden was demolished and the sculptor Max Dennert created the marble group Geschwister oder der erste Schritt, financed by Franz Ernst Schütte. This did not survive the Second World War. After the end of the war, the Meierei was confiscated by US soldiers and given to various youth groups for leisure activities, which led to the partial destruction of the interior within six years. In 1951, the Americans released the building from their possession and it was renovated. In 1970, the interior was redesigned and between 1976 and 1980, the exterior facades were renovated. In 1981, the management was taken over by the Parkhotel staff. In 2002, the facades were renovated and the color scheme was restored according to the original plans. In 2014, the building was renovated and the interior redesigned as part of a change of tenant. In addition, the original front staircase, which had been removed when the veranda was widened in the past, was restored in a smaller width.

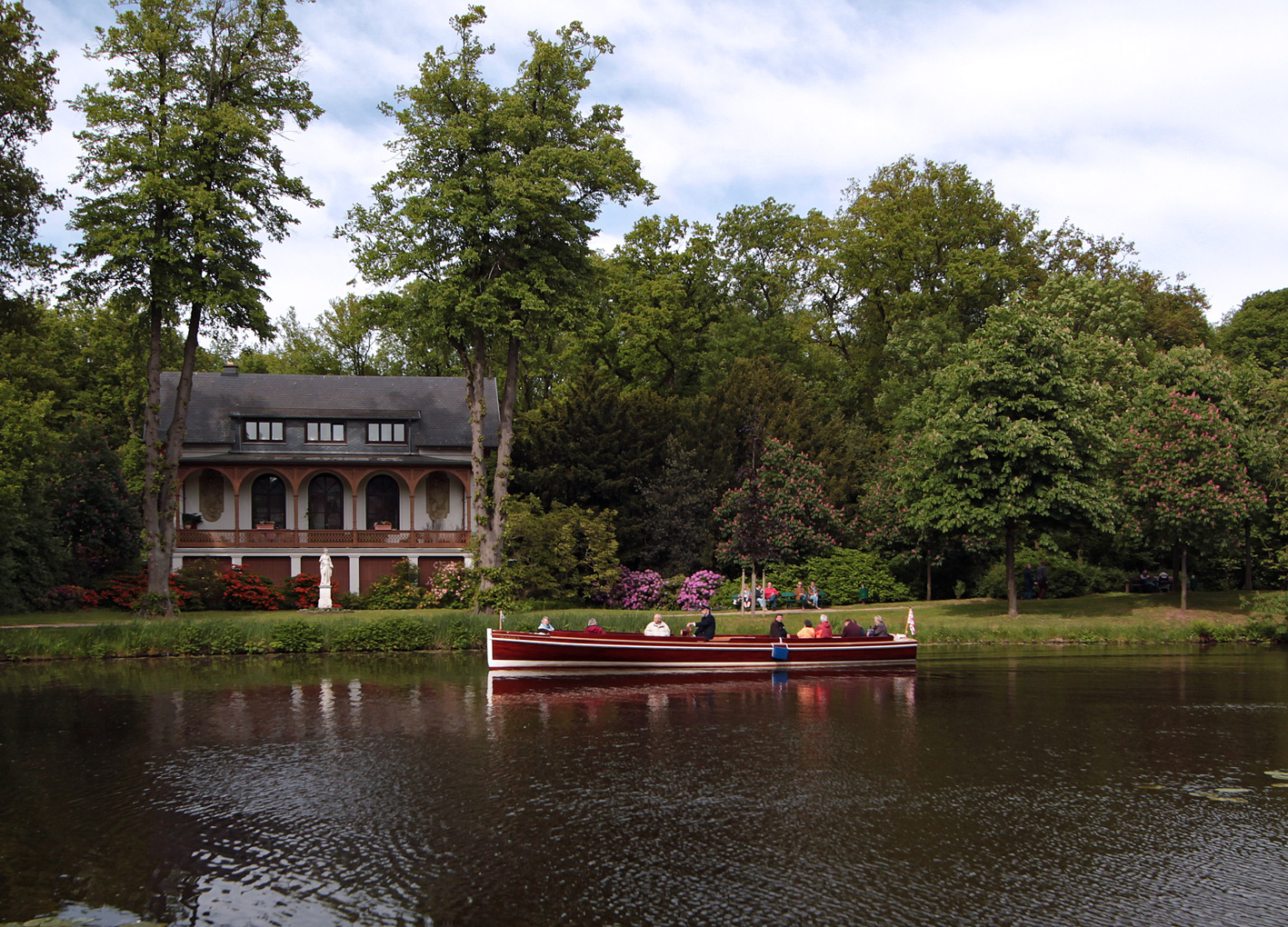
The new Marie 2013 in front of the Meierei Villa

In order to preserve the rural character that Wilhelm Benque originally intended for the Meierei, cows still graze on the meadows to the south of the house in the summer months. Not far from the dairy, on the other side of the lake, stands the Meiereivilla, a building constructed in 1882 as a farmyard for livestock farming. The floor plan was deliberately designed to be wide in order to conceal the courtyard behind it from the eyes of visitors to the park. The façade was given a screen to match the dairy; today the villa serves as an apartment for park staff. The boathouse for the replica of the historic excursion boat Marie from 1913, which was completed in 2013, is also located on the Meiereisee. The boat, which is powered by an electric motor, sails a circular route across the waters of the Bürgerpark at weekends and on public holidays from May to October. Four moorings were set up on the waterway for this purpose in 2012.

==== Emmasee coffee house ====
Heinrich Müller designed the coffee house on the northern shore of Lake Emmasee in 1867 as a light, flat wooden building called the "Zelt". In recognition of the great popularity of this establishment among the people of Bremen, permission was granted to extend the access paths and ornamental plantings, and the tenant was able to add a bandstand in front of the building a year later. The coffee house was extended in 1874. After 30,000 gold marks were paid out to the Bürgerparkverein from J. H. Gräving's legacy and brewery director Lambert Leisewitz donated 50,000 gold marks on the occasion of his silver wedding anniversary, the decision was made to build a solid new building on the same site. This was completed in 1897, in the "Tyrolean style" and had a high decorative tower on the ceiling of the summer hall. In 1908 and 1909, the house received a new music pavilion bearing the name of its benefactor as a gift from the banker Wätjen.

== Organization and financing ==
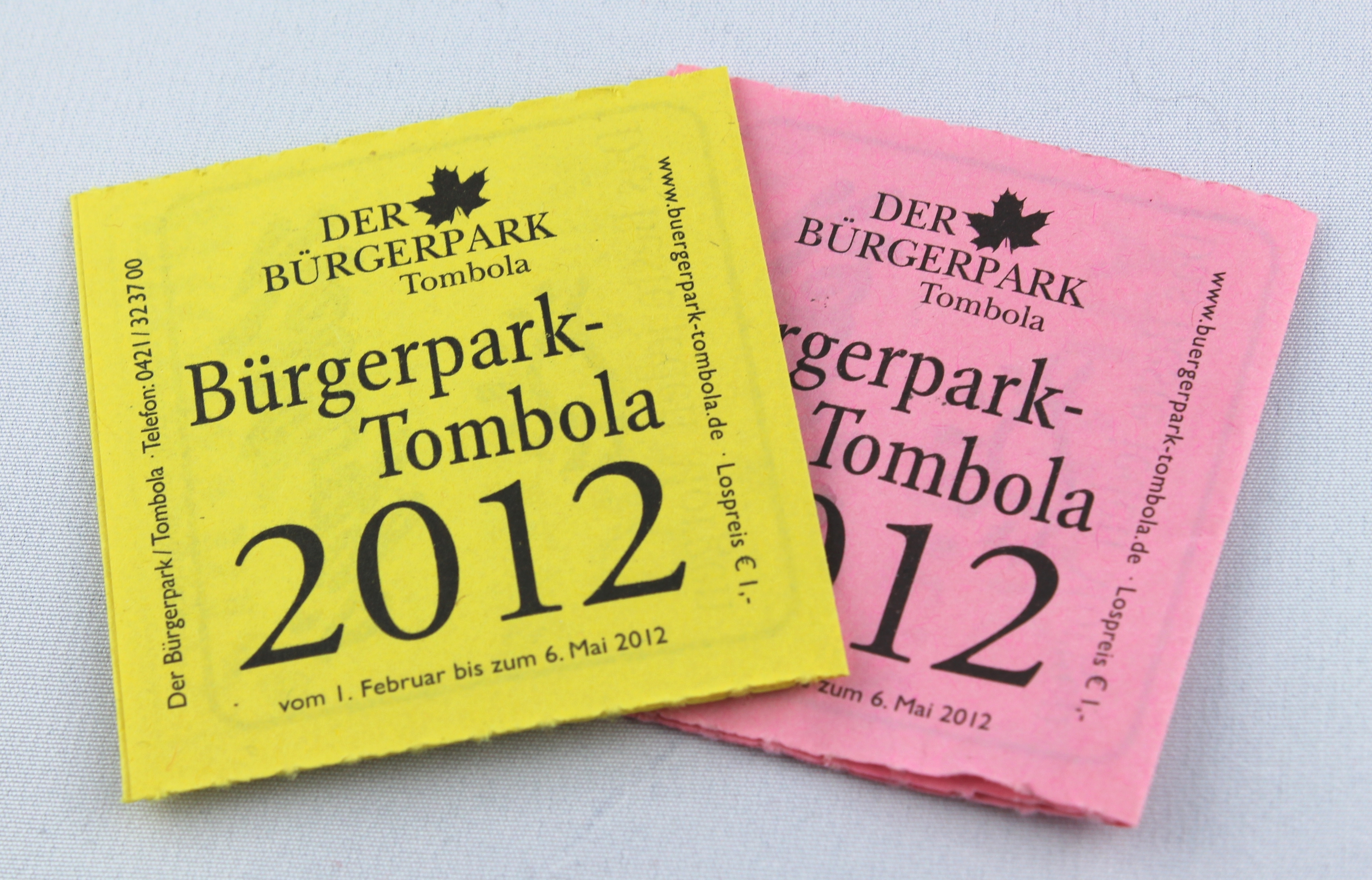
Tickets for the Bürgerpark raffle 2012

To this day, the Bürgerpark and the city forest are maintained without state funding by the Bürgerparkverein, which has a good 2,600 members, making it the largest privately financed city park in Germany. The Bürgerpark tombola is a major source of income. Since 1953, this has been held over a period of three months in the squares of Bremen's city center under the patronage of the respective mayor. In November 2000, the Bürgerparkverein set up the "Gräfin-Emma-Stiftung zur Erhaltung des Bremer Bürgerparks" (Countess Emma Foundation for the Preservation of Bremen's Bürgerpark) in order to permanently consolidate the parks financially. Once a fixed base amount has been reached, this is to serve as a supplementary safeguard. The foundation is administered by Sparkasse Bremen. Joachim J. Linnemann from the real estate company Justus Grosse was president of the Bürgerparkverein from 2004 until his death in 2022. Many of the trees, fountains and benches in Bürgerpark and the city forest are donations from Bremen residents and therefore often bear their names.

Depending on the time of year, the Bürgerparkverein employs 30 to 45 permanent staff in the administration office and as craftsmen and gardeners. The latter are responsible for maintaining the park, repairing damage and implementing new design ideas. In addition, eight to ten part-time staff are employed as security and cleaning personnel, for hunting and muskrat trapping. The association also offers school and work placements as well as a voluntary ecological year.

The average annual budget of the Bürgerpark and the city forest is between 2,000,000 and 2,500,000 euros. As a rule, one third of this amount is covered by legacies and inheritances. The remaining two thirds come from private donations, membership fees, large-scale fundraising campaigns, rental and lease income, foundation assets and funds from the lottery and lottery pots. The net proceeds from the Bürgerpark raffle tickets sold make a significant contribution to the financing - in 2012, 936,100 tickets were sold at one euro each. This makes the Bürgerpark tombola the highest-selling non-cash lottery in Germany. By 2003, the total proceeds amounted to around 46,000,000 and the net profit to around 19,200,000 euros.

== Personalities ==
Chairman (President) of the Bürgerparkverein

- 1865–1872: Justin Friedrich Wilhelm Löning, Kaufmann
- 1872–1876: August Friedrich Miesegaes
- 1877–1911: Franz Ernst Schütte, Kaufmann
- 1911–1917: Carl Georg Barkhausen, Bürgermeister
- 1918–1933: Clemens Carl Buff, Bürgermeister
- 1933–1934: Richard Markert, Bürgermeister
- 1934–1966: Franz Albrecht Schütte, Kaufmann
- 1966–1977: Otto Ronning, Kaufmann
- 1977–1981: Friedrich Selchert
- 1981–1998: Friedrich Rebers, Sparkassendirektor
- 1998–2004: Heinz-Werner Hempel
- 2004–2022: Joachim J. Linnemann

Park directors

- 1865–1870: Wilhelm Benque
- 1877–1884: Wilhelm Benque
- 1884–1908: Carl F.H.A. Ohrt (1852–1908)
- 1909–1918: Theodor G. Karich (1853–1918)
- 1919–1963: Hugo Riggers (1884–1968)
- 1964–1989: Günter Reinsch (1923–?)
- 1989–2012: Werner Damke
- seit 2012: Tim Großmann

== Literature ==
- Günter Reinsch: Der Bürgerpark – ein Beispiel deutscher Stadtparkanlagen in Bremen. In: Die Gartenkunst 2 (1/1990), p. 87–98.
- Günter Reinsch: 125 Jahre Parkpflege Bürgerpark Bremen. Die Gartenkunst 3 (2/1991), p. 225–234.
- Bürgerparkverein Bremen (Hrsg.), Die Wittheit zu Bremen (Hrsg.): 125 Jahre Bremer Bürgerpark. Johann Heinrich Döll-Verlag, Bremen, 1991, ISBN 3-88808-135-1.
- Bürgerparkverein (Hrsg.): Der Bürgerpark. Park begehen – Kultur erfahren. Natur beobachten – Natur erfahren. Kartenblatt. Asco Sturm Druck, Bremen 1994.
- Karolin Bubke: Zehn Jahrhunderte Bürgerweide Bremen. Aschenbeck & Holstein Verlag, Delmenhorst 1999, ISBN 3-932292-17-0.
- Herbert Schwarzwälder: Das Große Bremen-Lexikon. Edition Temmen, Bremen 2003, ISBN 3-86108-693-X.
- Ulrike Graf, Bürgerparkverein (Hrsg.): Der Stadtwald. Wald begehen – Kultur erfahren. Asco Sturm Druck, Bremen 2006.
