= Kuhgrabensee =

Lake in Germany

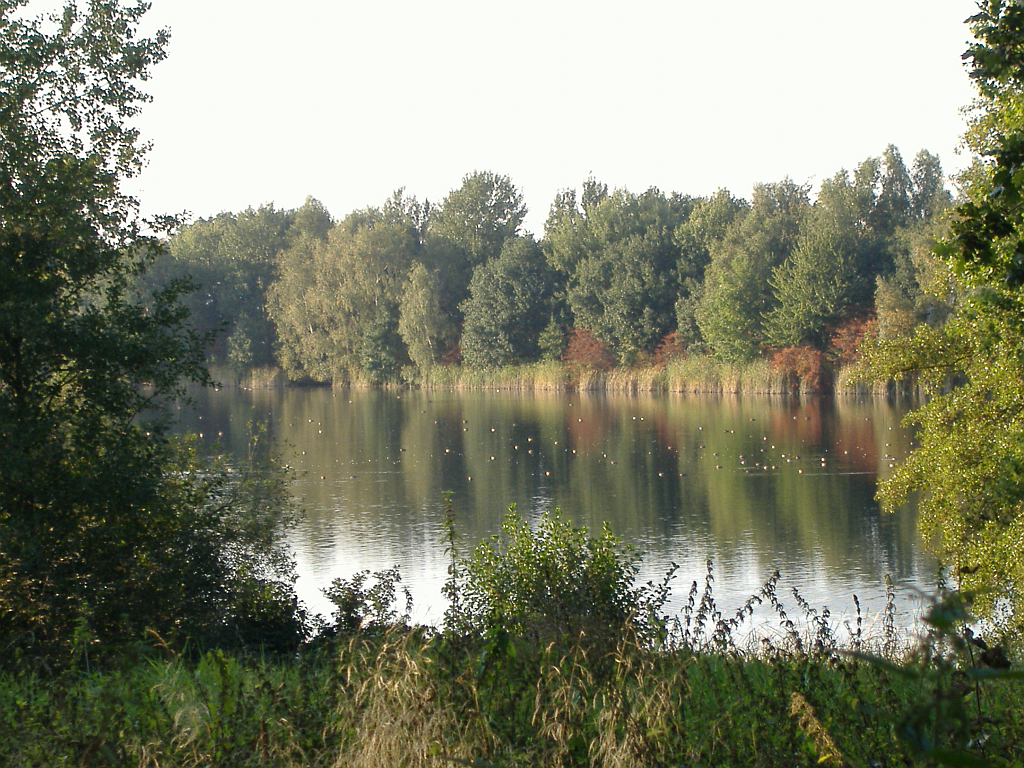

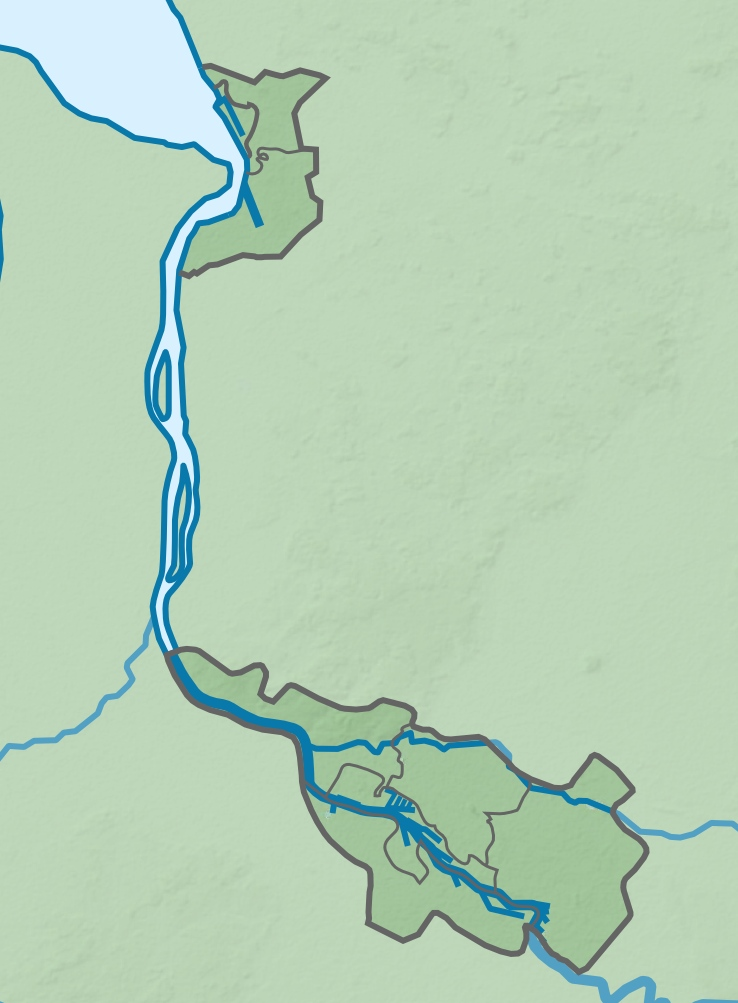
- Location within Bremen
- Location: Bremen
- Coordinates: 53°7′3″N 8°50′46″E
- Basin countries: Germany
- Surface area: 17.8 ha (44 acres)
- Average depth: 13 m (43 ft)
- Max. depth: 16 m (52 ft)
- Water volume: 1,800,000 m^{3} (64,000,000 cu ft)
- Settlements: Bremen

Kuhgrabensee is a lake entirely in the southeast of the Bremen district of Blockland. The lake has a surface area of approximately 17.8 hectares and a maximum depth of 16 meters with an average depth of 13 meters.

The Kuhgrabensee was excavated from 1970 to 1972 during the construction of the A27. Since July 1987 within his bank area is a 29.6-acre nature reserve . In 1998 to 1999 it was extended in the context of environmental compensation measure an approximately 4 acre flat water surface. The lake is groundwater-fed and has the influence of the salt dome Lilienthaler a high salt content. From the water quality of her Kuhgrabensee is mesotrophic.

The lake is entered in the EU as a European bird sanctuary. The lake offers habitat to many pioneer plants, dragonflies and amphibians. The Kuhgrabensee is the breeding ground of many birds, such as the great crested grebe.

== See also ==
- Stadtwaldsee (Bremen)
- Mahndorfer See
