= Stadtwaldsee (Bremen) =

- Unisee
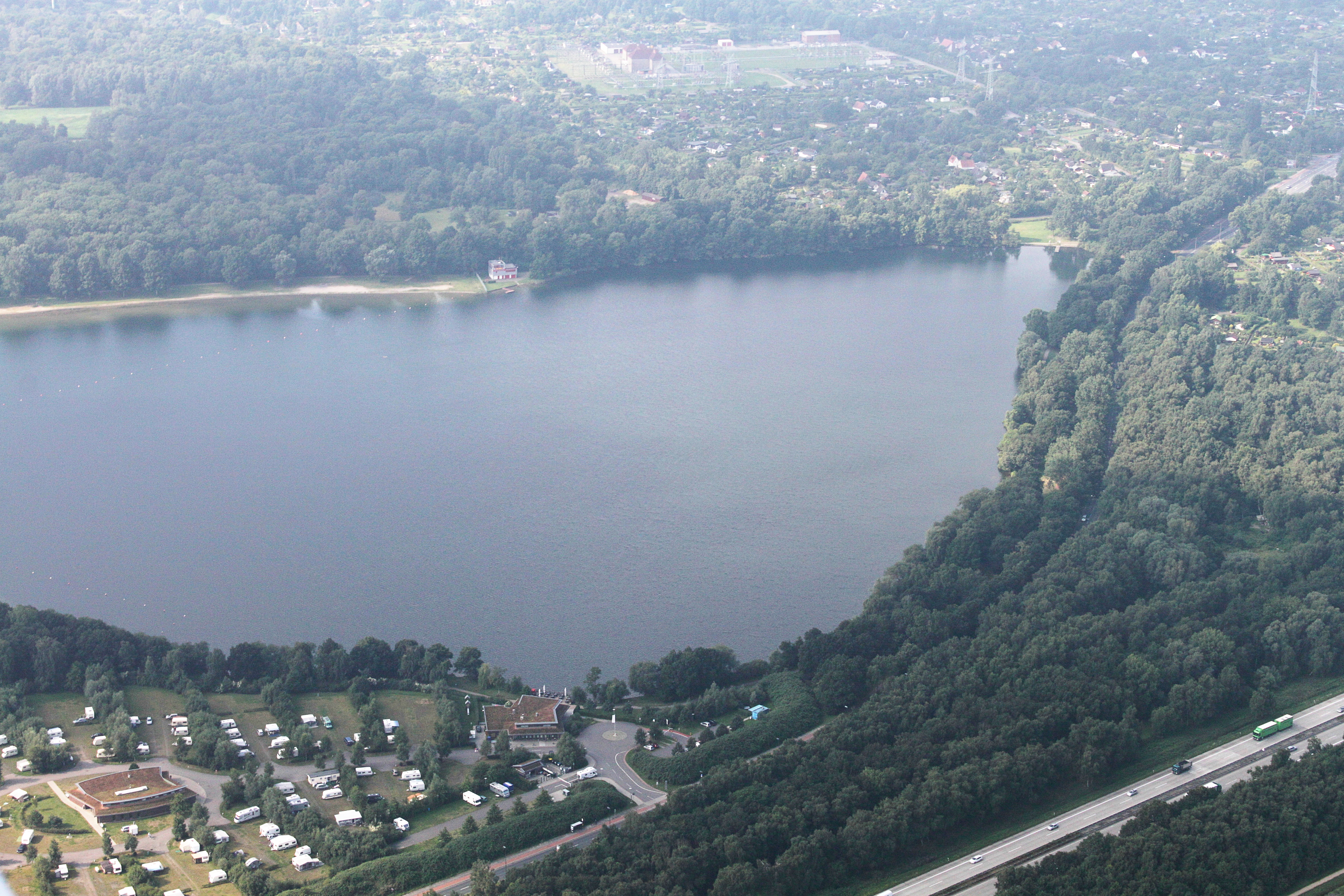
- Aerial view of the lake.

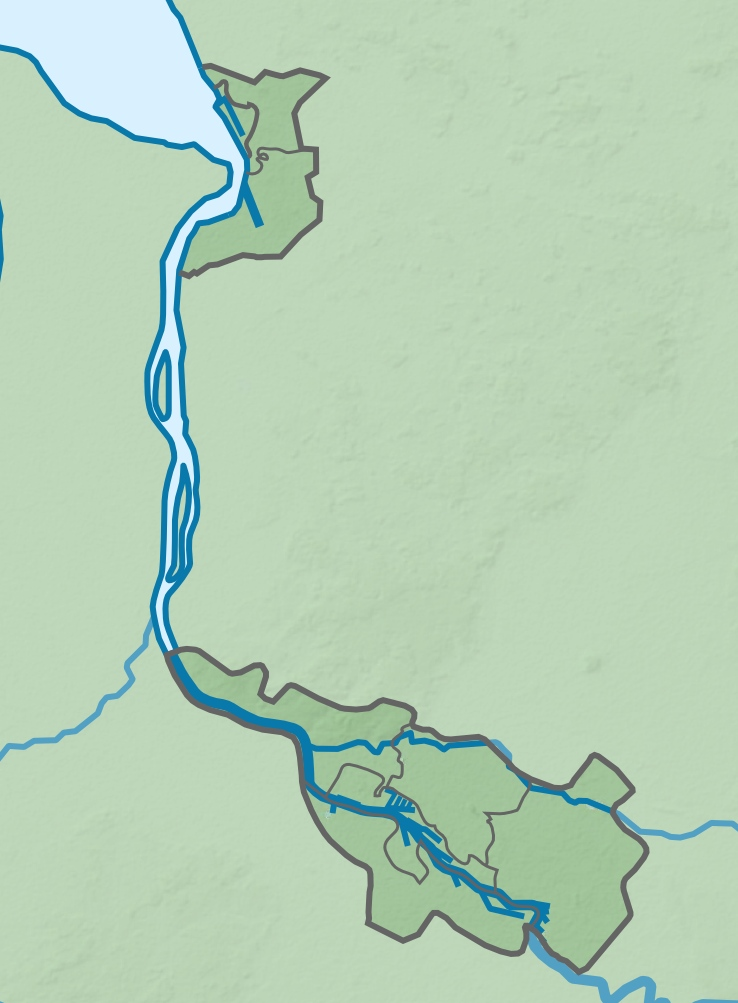
- Location within Bremen
- Location: Bremen, Germany
- Coordinates: 53°6′42″N 8°49′47″E
- Type: Excavation lake
- Surface area: 28.2 ha (70 acres)
- Max. depth: 16.5 m (54 ft)
- Shore length^{1}: 1,882 m (6,175 ft)
- Surface elevation: 1 m (3 ft 3 in)
- ^{1} Shore length is not a well-defined measure.

The Stadtwaldsee (City Forest Lake) is an excavation lake in Bremen, Germany. It is commonly known as the Unisee (University Lake) due to its proximity to Bremen University. At an elevation of 1 m (3 ft 3 in), its surface area is 28.2 ha (70 acres).

== Location ==
The lake is located in the Horn-Lehe district of Bremen, north of Bürgerpark (the main city park) and the Stadtwald (city forest) between Technologiepark Bremen (Bremen Technology Park) and Bundesautobahn 27 in the north.

== Features and usage ==
On the northeastern shore is the so-called "Uni-Wildnis", a nature reserve, a nude beach and, somewhat further west, the camping ground "HanseCamping Bremen". To the southeast, on the shore closest to the university, lies a grassy recreational area with a sand beach that is open to the public for swimming. There are occasional concerts and open air events in this area.

The western end of the lake is currently used by windsurfers, anglers and divers. A water-skiing facility being planned in 2005 and 2007 caused a dispute. A citizens' initiative and a majority of the City Advisory Council on one side were in opposition to the Ministry for Interior and Sport (the potential operator) on the other side.

Several investors plan to build hotels or wellness facilities against the will of the local residents on the north-eastern part of the lake.

In summer, the water often develops an algae buildup, so the lake must occasionally be closed to swimmers.

== History ==
The lake and the nature reserve were created by sand extraction during the development of the A 27 motorway and the construction of the university.

== Public transport access ==
The bus stops of Wetterungsweg, Campingplatz, and Stadtwaldsee on bus line 28 of the Bremer Straßenbahn AG are all near the northwest shore of the lake.

== See also ==
- Kuhgrabensee
- Mahndorfer See
