= Deutsche Bank building, Bremen =

Coordinates: 53°04′36″N 8°48′33″E

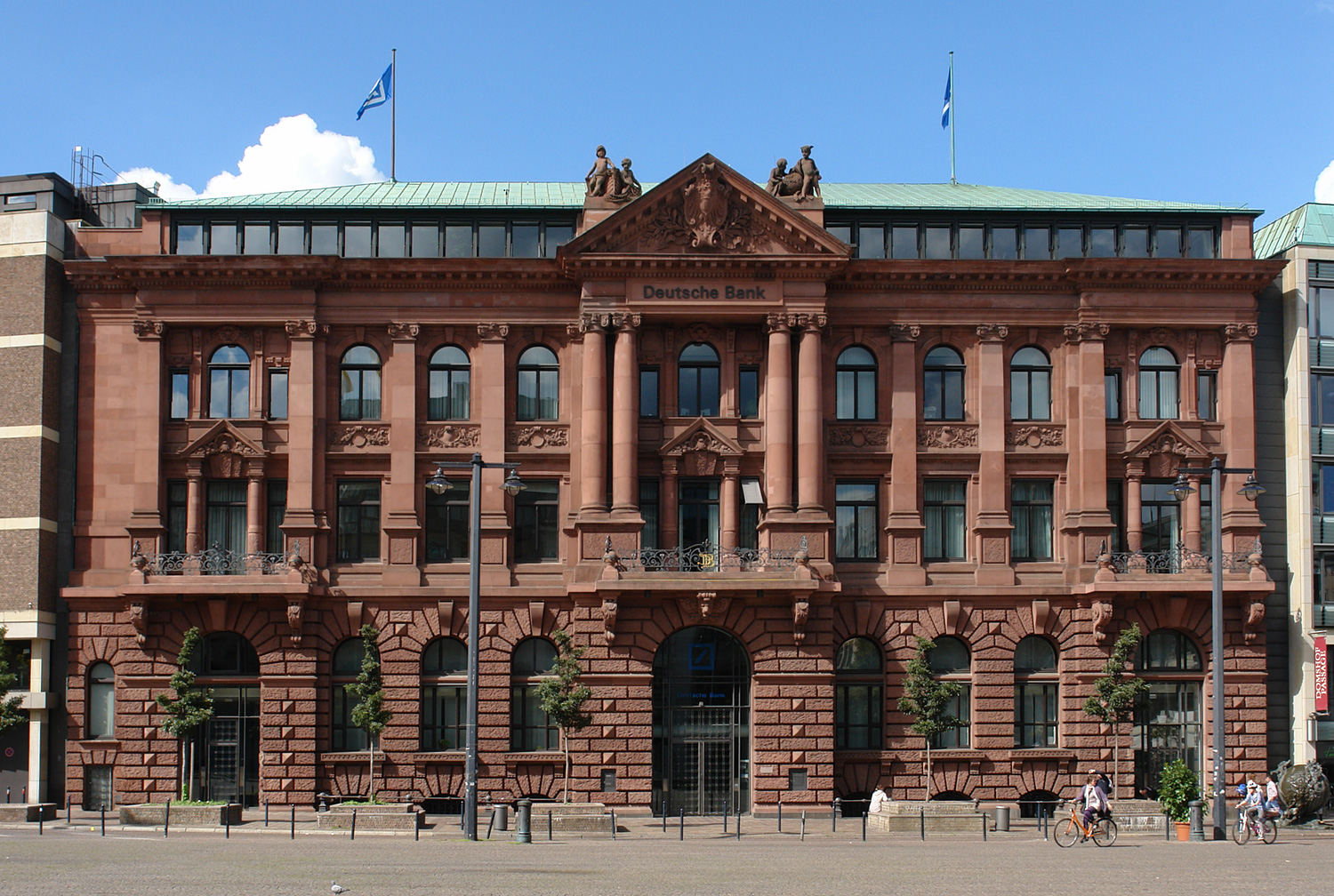
Deutsche Bank building on the Domshof

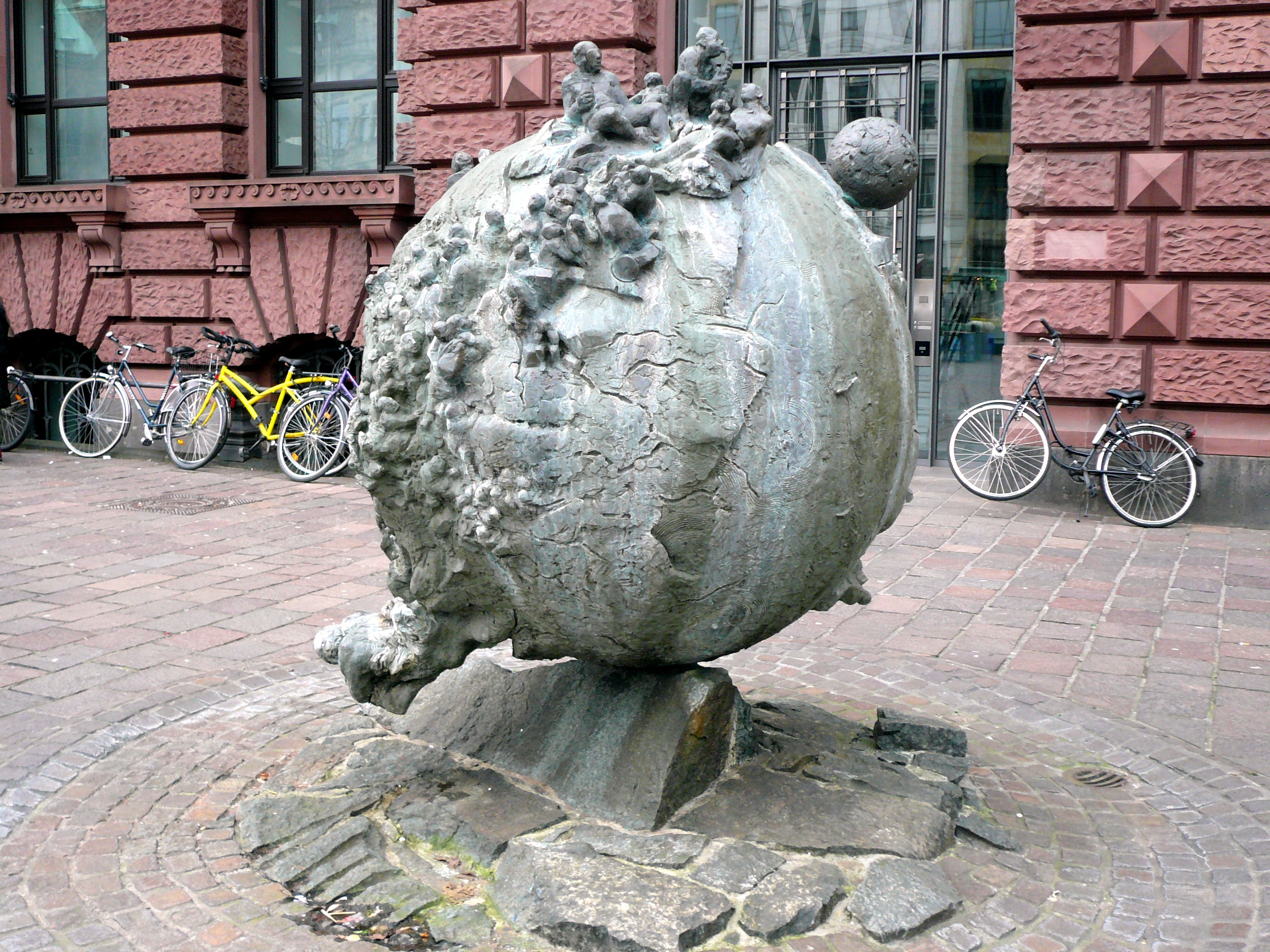
Unser Planet – a sculpture outside the bank

The Deutsche Bank building (German: Deutsche Bank am Domshof) on Domshof Square in the centre of Bremen, Germany, was completed in 1891 in a Historicist style by the architects Wilhelm Martens and Friedrich Wilhelm Rauschenberg.

== History and architecture ==
The imposing building located at No. 25 Domshof was designed by Wilhelm Martens (1842–1910) from Berlin and the Bremen architect Friedrich Wilhelm Rauschenberg (1853–1935). The building was for the Deutsche Bank which had been founded in 1870 in Berlin with a major aim of supporting foreign trade with Germany. The bank's building is built in red sandstone from the Main Valley in a currently popular Historicist style derived from Italian 16th-century practice, in which colossal Ionic pilasters link two main floors above a high rusticated basement storey; the expanded central entrance bay is pedimented and the end bays are slightly emphasized and lightly projecting.

Martens, the house architect of Deutsche Bank, Berlin, was considered a specialist in bank design. He also drew up plans for the Sparkasse building on Bremen's Am Brill which was completed in 1906. Rauchenberg, who above all was responsible for overseeing the actual construction of the building, is remembered for his many residential and commercial buildings in the city, mainly designed in the Neo-Renaissance style. The Deutsche Bank am Domshof has been a listed building since 1981.

In connection with the construction of the Domshof Passage from 1996 to 1999, the bank building was modernized by the Bremen architects Harm Haslob, Peter Hartlich and Jens Kruse. The passage is a shopping arcade with sixteen shops which allows visitors to travel to the Katherinenpassage which was built less than ten years before.

The building faces the Domshof, the market square, in Bremen and just in front of the bank is a sculpture based on a model of the world. Titled Unser Planet (Our Planet), it was made by the German sculptor Bernd Altenstein.
