= Forum Domshof =

Sheltered area with a glass roof in northern Germany

Coordinates: 53°4′36.17″N 8°48′35.53″E

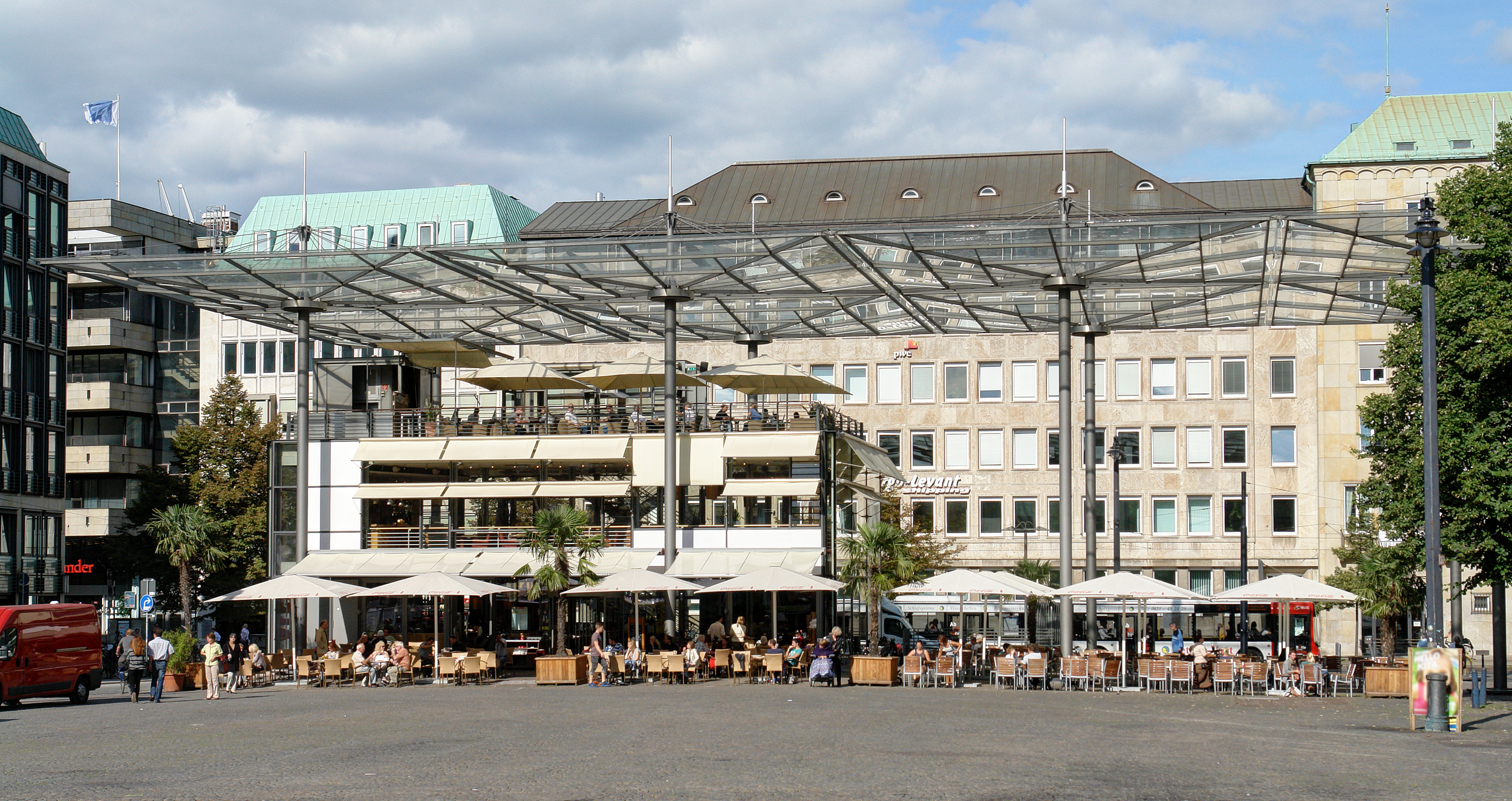
Forum Domshof

The Forum Domshof (German: Domshof-Forum) is a sheltered area with a glass roof on the Domshof square in the centre of Bremen in northern Germany. It contains the Bistro-Café Alex, which was built in 1998.

== History ==
In 1998/99, after the tram stop had been relocated, the Domshof-Forum was built to the design of the architect's office Joachim Schürmann. An almost horizontal glass roof was erected, supported by eight steel columns with a height of 16 m (52 ft). The roof has a surface area of 1,000 m^{2} (11,000 sq ft) and is stabilised by delicate steel rope structures. The three-storeyed building below this roof which occupies approximately one third of the Domshof looks like giant glass containers piled up on top of each other. The floor space of 700 m^{2} (7,500 sq ft) allows for 150 seats. The Domshof Café consists of glass, steel, white square wall panels and white sun-protection blinds. The outdoor area below the roof offers a wide view across the Domshof. The building is operated by the Bistro-Café Alex.
