= Rauschenberg (surname) =

Rauschenberg is surname of:

- Dane Rauschenberg (born 1976), American long-distance runner
- Friedrich Wilhelm Rauschenberg (1853–1935), German architect
- Reinhard Rauschenberg (1879–1953), German politician
- Robert Rauschenberg (1925–2008), American artist who came to prominence in the 1950s transition from Abstract Expressionism to Pop Art

== See also ==
- Rauschenberg (disambiguation)
- Rauschenberger
