= Rauschenberg (disambiguation) =

Robert Rauschenberg (1925–2008) was an American painter and graphic artist.

Rauschenberg may also refer to:

- Rauschenberg, Hesse, Germany
- Rauschenberg (surname)
