= Rauschenberger =

Rauschenberger is a German locational surname, which originally meant a person from the town of Rauschenberg, Hesse in Germany. Notable people with the surname include:

- Ariel Rauschenberger (born 1966), Argentine politician
- Ryan Rauschenberger (born 1982), American politician
- Steve Rauschenberger (born 1956), American politician
- William C. Rauschenberger (1855–1918), American politician

== See also ==
- Rauschenberg (surname)
