= Jacob Ephraim Polzin =

Architect active in Bremen, Germany

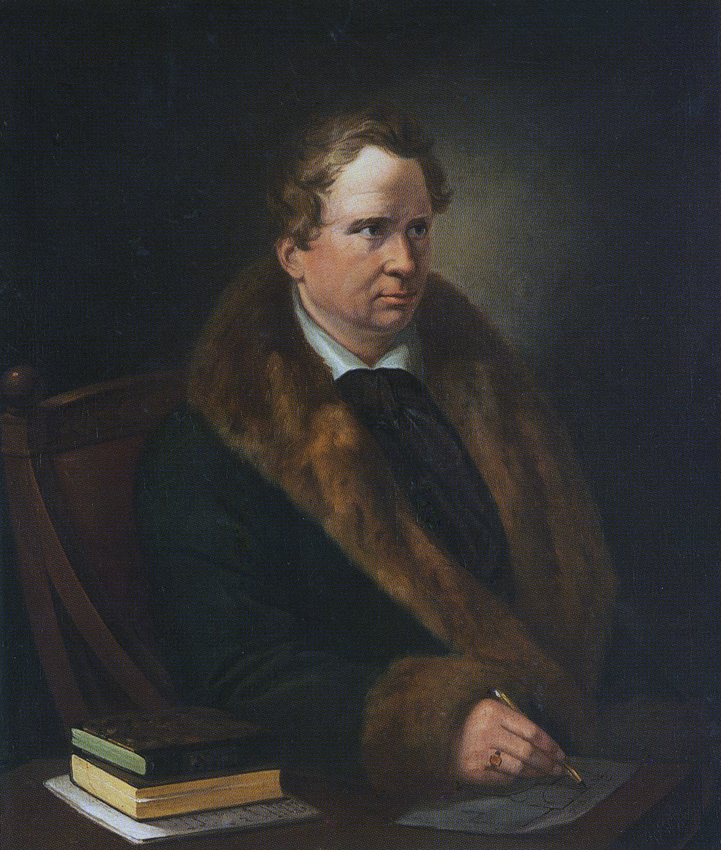
- c. 1830 portrait by Rudolph Suhrlandt
- Born: 1778; Königsberg
- Died: 18 November 1851 (aged 72–73); Bremen

Jacob Ephraim Polzin (1778 – 18 November 1851) was a German Neoclassical architect active in Bremen, Germany.

== Life ==
Son of a master carpenter, Polzin was born in Königsberg in 1778. He trained in Copenhagen and quickly found work for three years helping to construct the new Christiansborg Palace which Christian Frederik Hansen had designed.

In 1811 he moved to Bremen where he married the daughter of the local master carpenter in 1814. Polzin had worked on re-designing the town's marketplace notwithstanding the French occupation. He also worked on houses in the Schlachte and what was then the river island of Teerhof. The houses on the Teerhof were largely destroyed by bombing during the second world war. Polzin's work at that time was said to be influenced by Karl Friedrich Schinkel.

Polzin worked on the creation of the new street and buildings which were created as the town walls were abandoned. The new street was named Am Wall and several of Polzin's designs are still standing. In 1832 designed a church in Bremen's northern suburb of Vegesack and in 1838 be designed the museum on the Domshof.

Polzin and his wife had two sons, Christian and Friedrich, who became architects. Their father died in his adopted town of Bremen in 1851.
