= Domshof =

Square in Bremen, Germany

Coordinates: 53.0763°N 8.8093°E

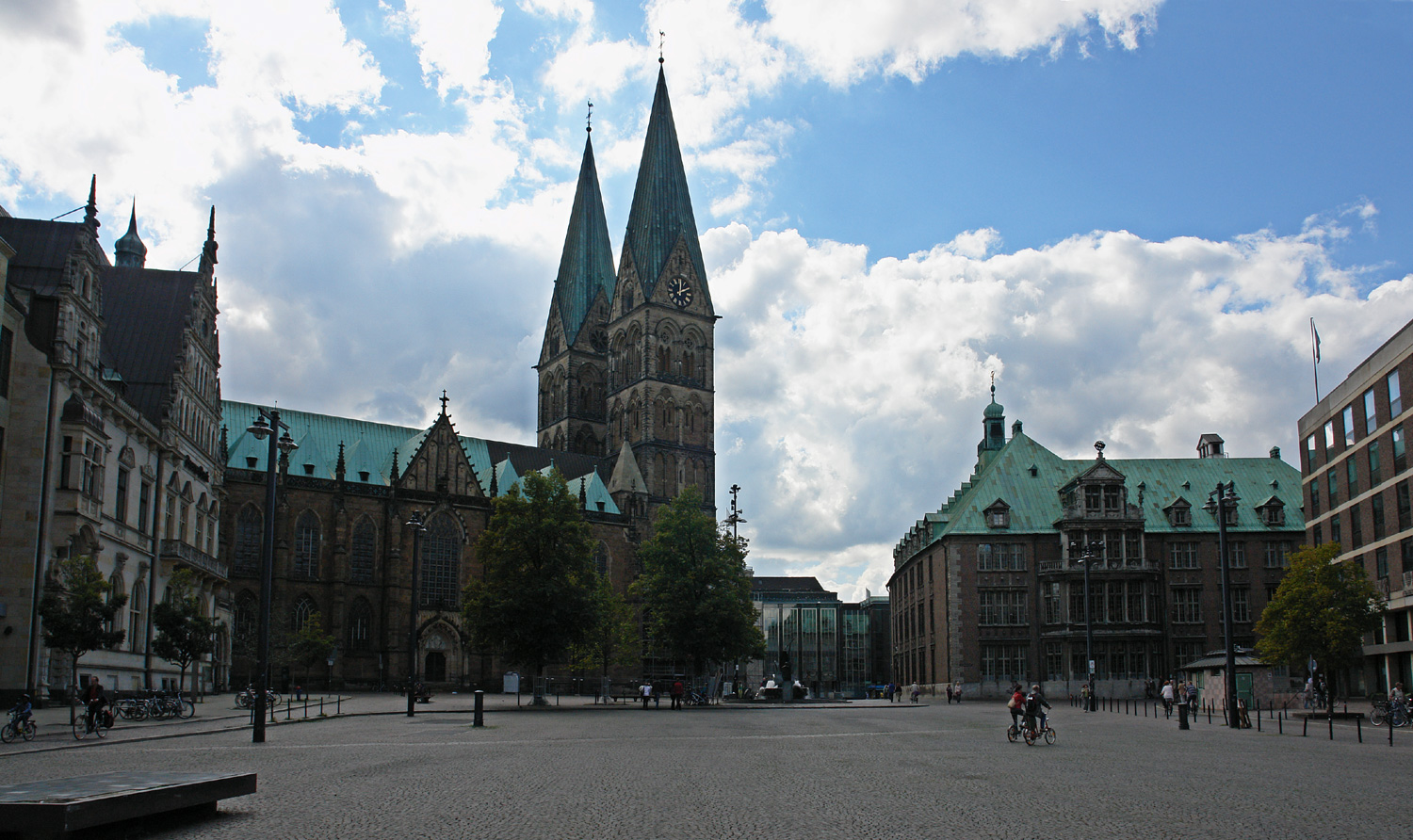
Bremer Bank, cathedral, Bürgerschaft, town hall, and Landesbank seen from the Domshof

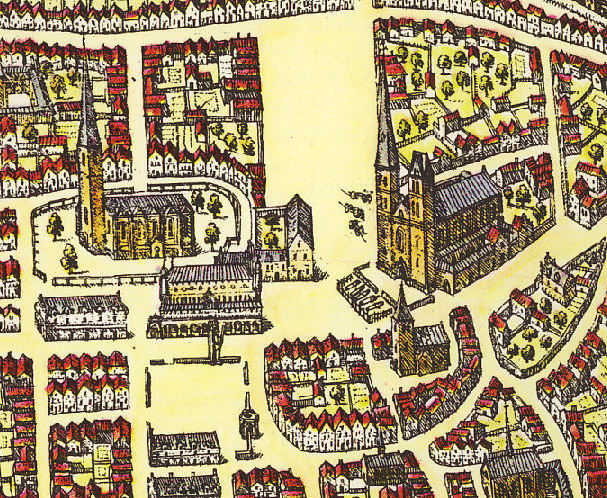
1589: Part of an engraving by Frans Hogenberg Upper Middle: Domshof with the cathedral Lower left: Bremer Marktplatz with the Town Hall Above the market: Church of Our Lady Right: Domsheide

The Domshof (Cathedral Court) is a town square in Bremen, north of the cathedral and the Marktplatz. The Domshof is used for markets as well as larger outdoor events, particularly May Day demonstrations.

The Domshof is a trapezoid 67 m (220 ft) in width, 100 m (330 ft) long on the western side and 130 m (430 ft) long on the eastern side. Several streets radiate off the square (Schüsselkorb, Violenstraße, Seemannstraße, Sandstraße, Unser-Lieben-Frauen-Kirchhof and the Dompassage). Buildings on the square include Bremen Cathedral, the Town Hall of Bremen, Bremen Landesbank, the Deutsche Bank am Domshof, SEB Bank (formerly BfG), the Schifffahrtsbank and the Bremer Bank.

The buildings around the Domshof are relatively uniform in construction, being made of sandstone (e.g. Bremer Bank) and dark red or clinker brick (e.g. the town hall and the Landesbank). The red Maintal sandstone of the Deutsche Bank and a white rendered building (Number 11) differ from the others.

== History ==
=== Middle Ages and Reformation ===
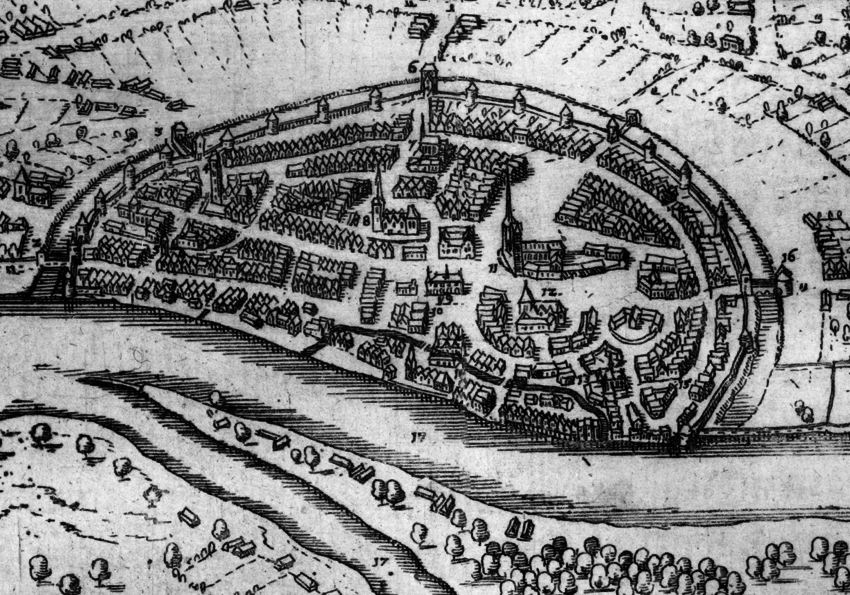
View of Bremen in the 13th century, with the Domshof visible above the cathedral

From the 10th century until 1803 the Domshof belonged to the Cathedral District (de: Dombezirk, Domimmunität or Domfreiheit; cf. also Liberty), an enclave under the sovereign and legal control of the Prince-Archbishop of Bremen, and was not under the control of the Free city of Bremen.

After the construction of the cathedral in the early Middle Ages, a wall was built around the Cathedral District, which ran across the square; its former course is still visible in the pavement of the square today. This was demolished by 1043 at the instigation of Archbishop Adalbert of Hamburg. Thereafter the Domshof was no longer marked off from the rest of the city. There was repeated conflict between the Prince-Archbishop and the city council about their respective rights and duties in the area.

The cathedral was built at the highest point of the Bremen sandbank, and was more than 5.5 m (18 ft) higher than the other end of the square in the Middle Ages. In the course of time, the ground built up until it reached its modern form in the 14th century, measuring 60 m (200 ft) × 135 m (443 ft). At the west end there were houses of burghers, gabled houses stood in the north, with more burghers' houses to the northeast and the Prince-Archbishops' buildings stood in the east beside the cathedral. The Prince-Archbishop's Palace, the later site of the City-Vogt, closed the southwest of the square off from the Bremer Marktplatz. During this time, the Domshof was also used as a tourney field - a grand festive joust took place at Pentecost in 1335 on the occasion of the rediscovery of the relics of Saints Cosmas and Damian under Prince-Archbishop Burchard Grelle.

The boundaries of the Domshof remained an object of contention between the Prince-Archbishop and the city through the 14th and 15th centuries. The chroniclers record that the city held events in the square in the 16th century and exhibited the guns won by Bremen at the Battle of Drakenburg in the square from 1547 to 1557. There were disputes in 1592 when the council had a large amount of building material for the fortifications stored in the square and in 1636 when the council set up two pillories in front of the Prince-Archbishop's Palace.

=== 17th and 18th centuries: Sweden and Hanover ===
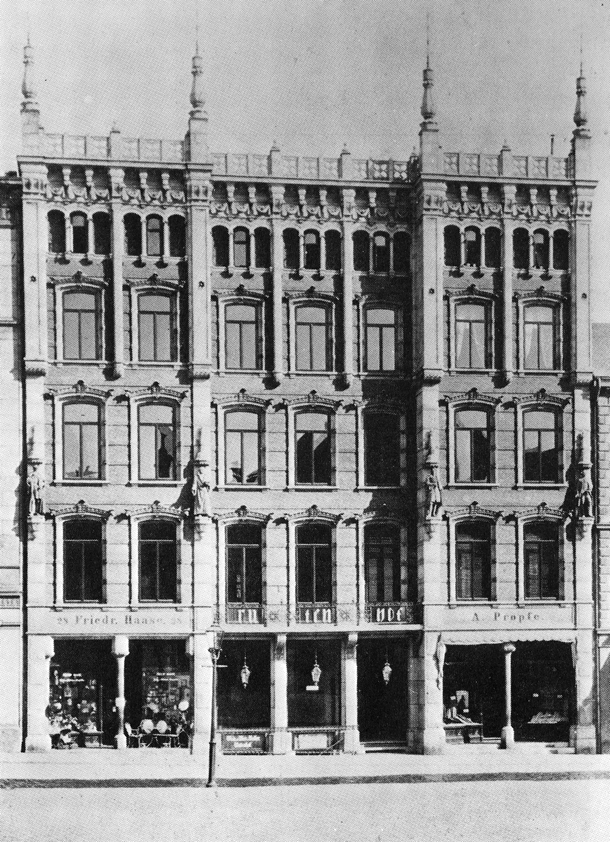
The Rutenhof on the Domshof in Bremen; built 1873–1875, demolished 1967–1968 Architect Lüder Rutenberg

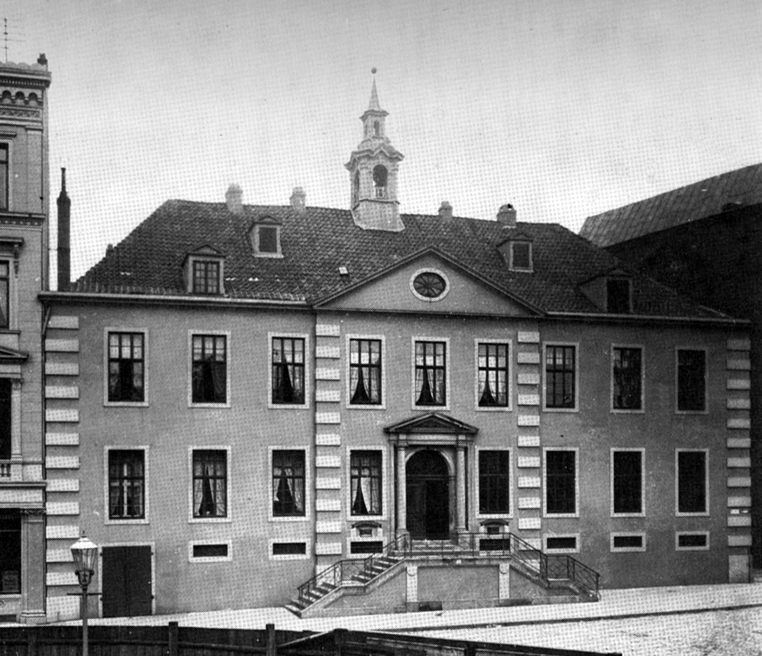
St. Peter's Orphanage on the Domshof c.1890, demolished 1902

The sovereign government of the cathedral, along with the Cathedral District and the palace, changed several times. Until the Reformation it was the Catholic Prince-Archbishop, then the Lutheran Administrator regnant of the Prince-Archbishopric, then Swedish Bremen-Verden from 1648, then Electoral Hanover from 1715 to 1719, finally becoming part of the City of Bremen in 1803.

Up to 1803, the boundaries of the square remained unclear. In the agreement of 1654 which ended the First Swedish War on Bremen, only usage regulations were established with respect to the Domshof and the Domsheide. Bremen claimed the whole square for itself, held military parades and other events on it and the square was used for the storage of lumber and peat, as well as a regular pig market. Swedish protests went unheard. The unclear usage regulations meant that the houses on the Domshof that were owned by the church and then the Swedish Crown fell into disrepair.

Johann Daniel Heinbach's plan of 1730 shows a large stack of timber in the northern part of the square from about 70 trees. The north side was ringed by the gabled houses of burghers in Gothic and Renaissance style. The western and eastern sides with half-timbered houses, carriage houses and stables are shown with many vacant lots. Johann Christian Danckwerth listed 160 buildings belonging to the Electorate of Hanover, of which eight houses and five shabby stalls by the cathedral were in the "Great Doms Hof".

In the 18th century, the square was used as a military assembly point as well as for executions and running the gauntlet. Bremen continued to use the square as before and, though Hanover made protests through its civic administration, these were unsuccessful. The question of sovereignty over the Domshof (whether the square was fundus regis or part of the free city) remained "in suspenso". When stalls were set out for the Freimarkt, both the Mayor of Bremen and the Hanoverian alderman approved them and Hanover collected the rental fee.

Hanover's intendant in Bremen, Theodor Olbers wrote "Since the Domshof is one of the most beautiful squares in the city of Bremen..." it would be good if "it were embellished." As a result of this proposal, the square was partially renovated by Bremen and Hanover together. Some 60 or 70 new linden trees were planted in two groups, bordered by 69 sandstone pillars and 195 m (640 ft) of chain, so that a tree-lined avenue ran through the middle of the square. An area between the cathedral and the palace was paved in 1799. The city council hoped,

"that soon the rest of the Domshof may be lifted from its embarrassing, desolate, and swampy condition by this opportunity."

Soon after this the square received street lighting.

=== From 1803: The Domshof as a square of Bremen ===
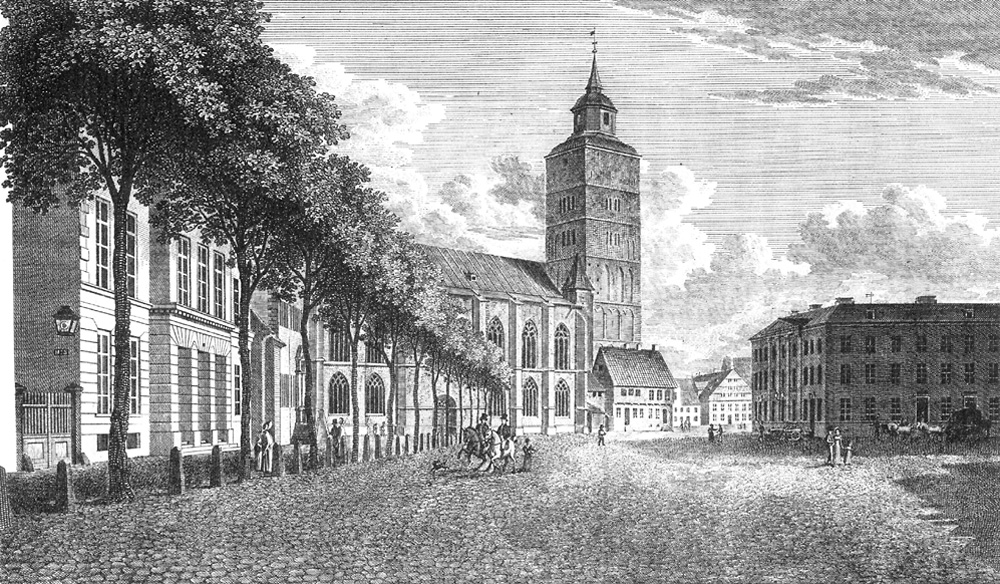
The Domshof c.1821

In 1803, as part of German mediatization, the Cathedral District became part of Bremen; thereafter the whole Domshof unquestionably belonged to the city. Within two years the Gesellschaft Museum had acquired the intendant's office on the corner of the Domshof and Schüsselkorb. A magnificent kontor house was built on the east side in 1809 (Number 10). House number 18 was the location of the prison prefect. The demolition of the shabby stalls by the cathedral occurred at this time.

The Gothic palace which dated from 1293 was largely in disrepair by 1816 and a Stadthaus was built on its location by 1818, according to the plans of Nicolaus Blohm.

In 1823 the building inspector Friedrich Moritz Stamm submitted a design for the complete remodelling of the square, which was accepted. The overgrown linden trees were removed, as was the central avenue, the thoroughfare lay next to the "trottoirs" on both sides of the square (as it does today) and the centre of the square was levelled, surrounded by stone posts and designated for pedestrian traffic only. The location encouraged the erection of hotels including Stadt Frankfurt and Zum Lindenhof as well as pubs like Börsenhalle, Shaers Kaffeehaus, and Stehely & Josty and the restaurant Quinat & Ritsert. The mansion at number 20 gave way in 1820 to the Lindenhof hotel, built by the restaurateur Albrecht Knoche. This hotel hosted a number of important German royals in the 1820s and 1830s. In 1837 it was increased to four floors and in 1857 a café was built by Wilhelm Wallau. As a result of bankruptcies the hotel became public service offices in 1862 and in 1944 it was bombed.

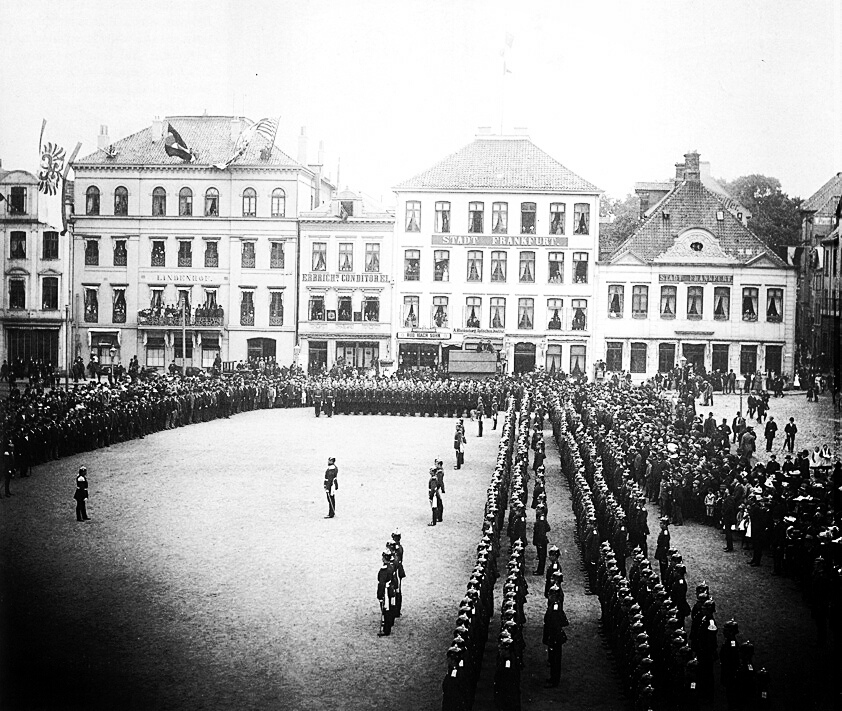
Muster of the 1st Hanseatic Infantry Regiment Nr. 75 ("Bremen") on its 25 anniversary in 1891 in the Domshof

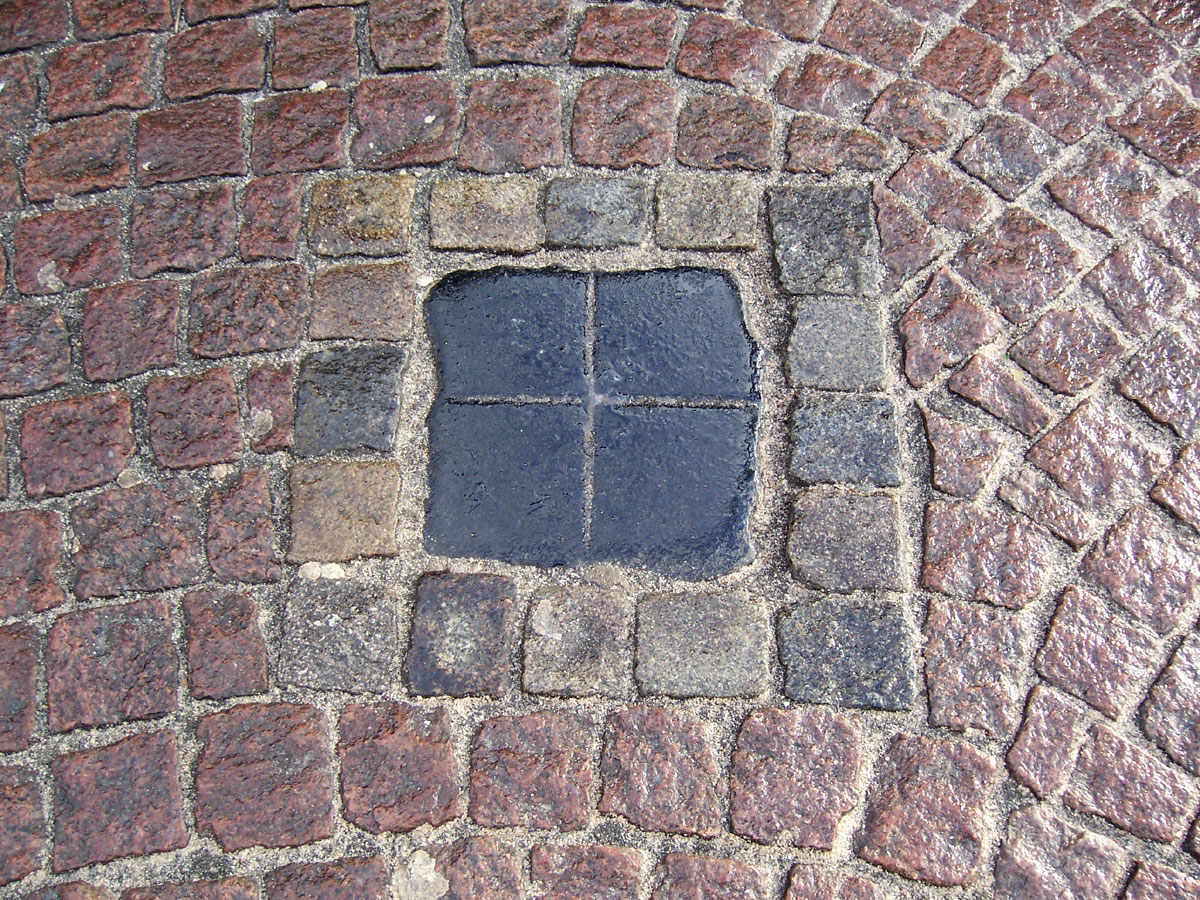
Spitting stone for Gesche Gottfried

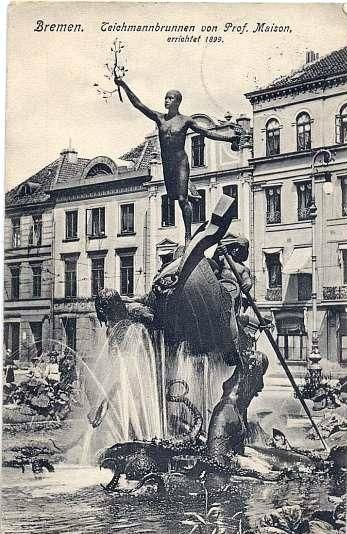
The Teichmann Fountain, in front of the Hotels

The infamous poisoner Gesche Gottfried was executed in 1831 at the south end of the Domshof, near the cathedral, before a crowd of 35,000. A spitting stone in unworked basalt with an engraved cross serves as a memorial to this, the last public execution in Bremen. Other assemblies and marches took place in the square in 1848 when volunteers came to join the war against Denmark, in 1849 on the anniversary of the Revolution, in 1851 by protesting supporters of the pastor Rudolph Dulon, in 1865 for the Second German National Shooting Competition, in 1871 to celebrate victory in the Franco-Prussian War and in 1913 to celebrate the centenary of the Battle of Leipzig. These celebrations included military parades, musters, free markets through 1913, daily changes of the guard, and memorial days.

From 1858 there was further demolition and construction; the square was transformed into a hub of business and shopping. Business offices were erected: Number 11 in 1858, Number 23 in 1864, and Numbers 9 & 25 in 1871. A museum was built according to the plans of Heinrich Müller at Number 21a - it was destroyed in 1944. The entrepreneur Lüder Rutenberg constructed Rutenhof at Numbers 26-28 in 1875.

=== Transformation to a banking hub ===
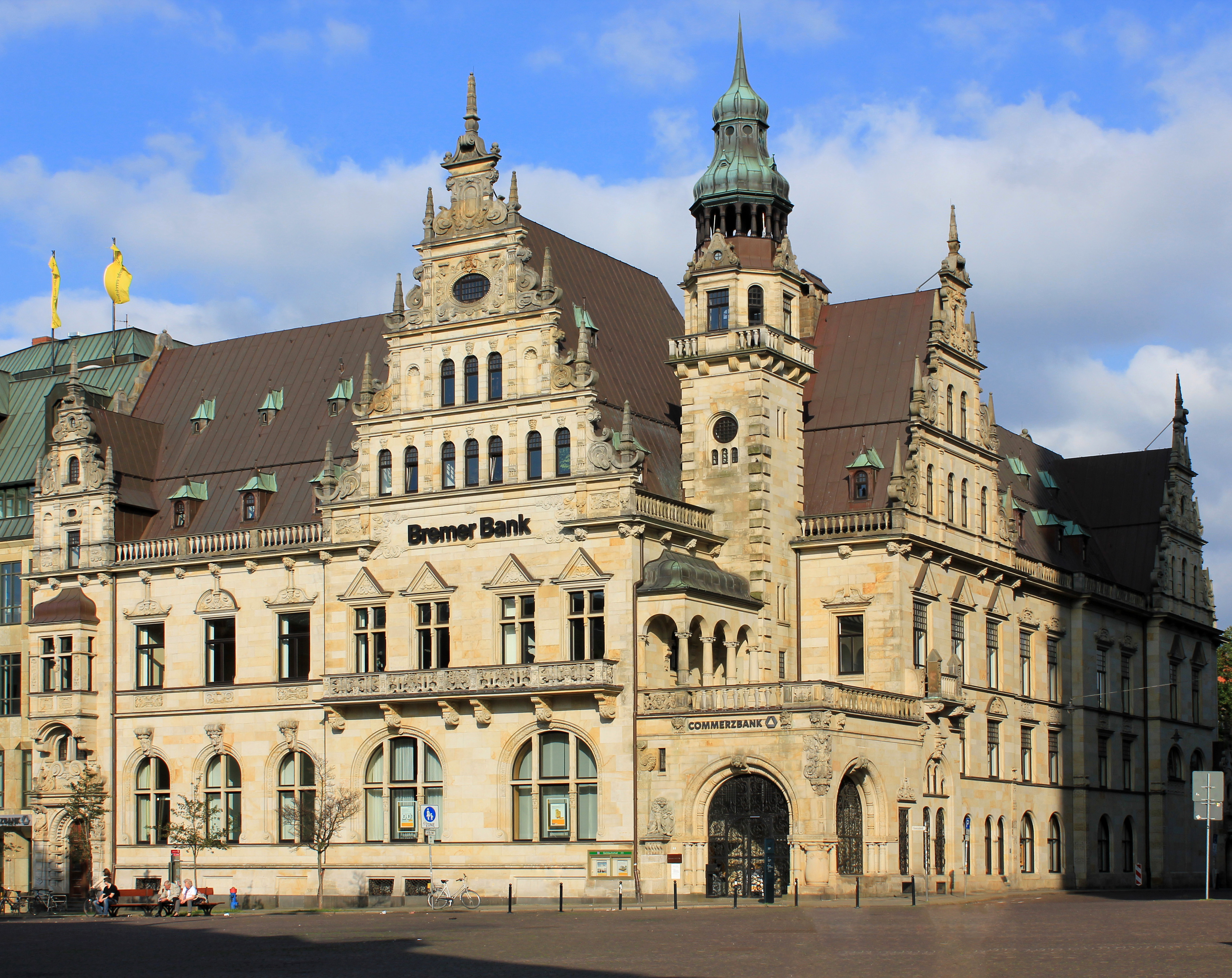
Numbers 8-10 built 1906: formerly Bremer Bank, now Commerzbank

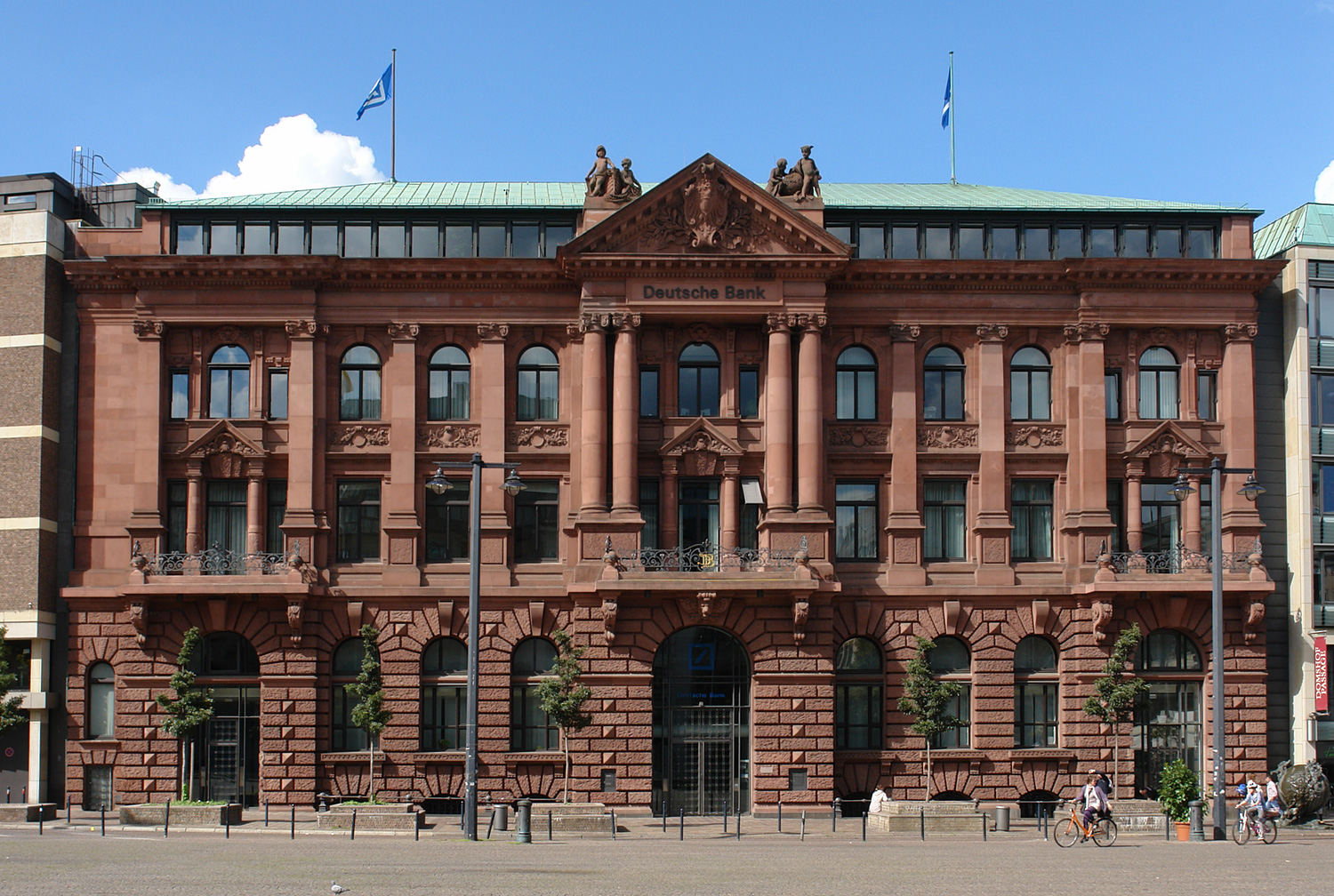
Numbers 22-25 built 1891: Deutsche Bank

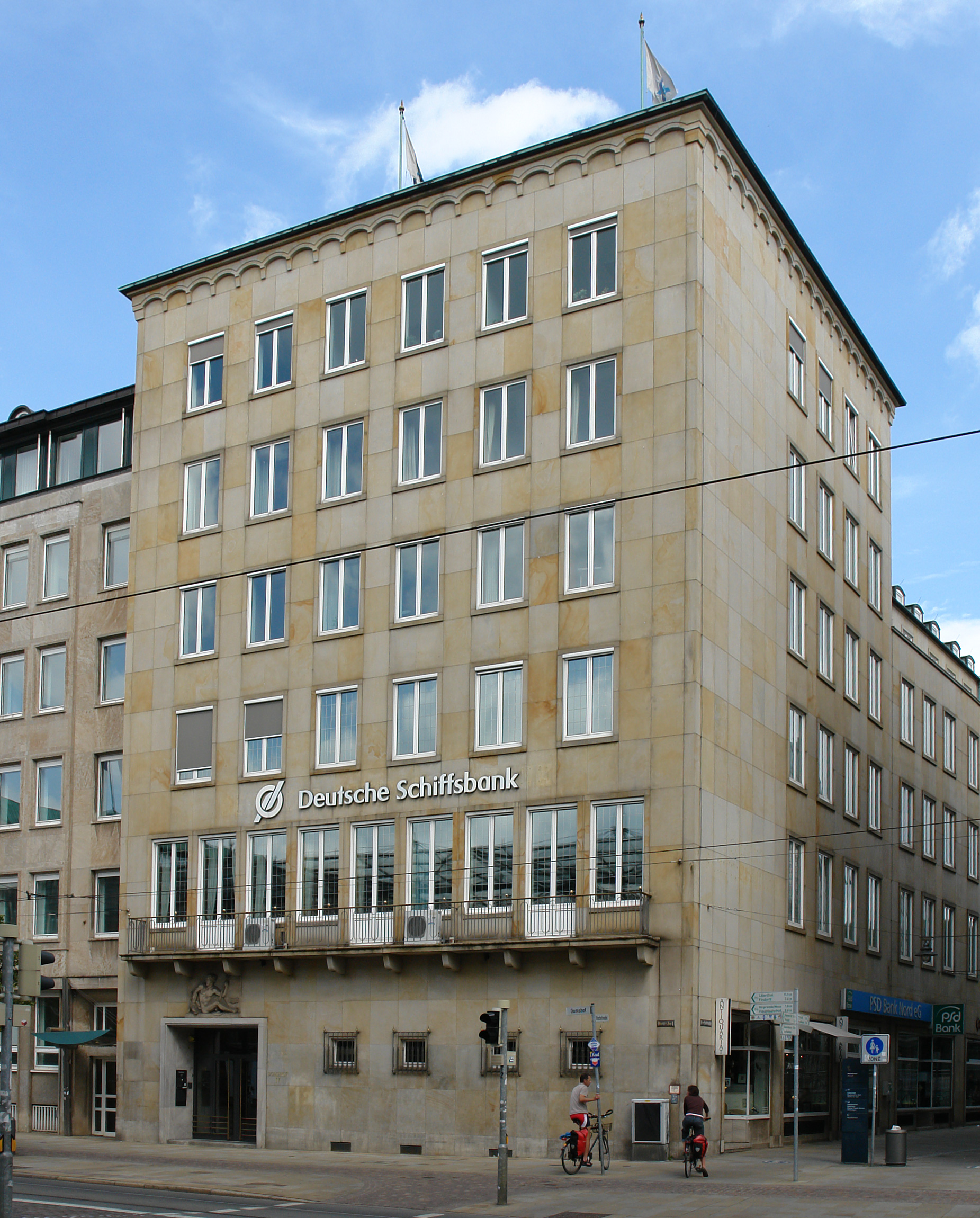
Number 17 built 1953: Deutsche Schiffsbank

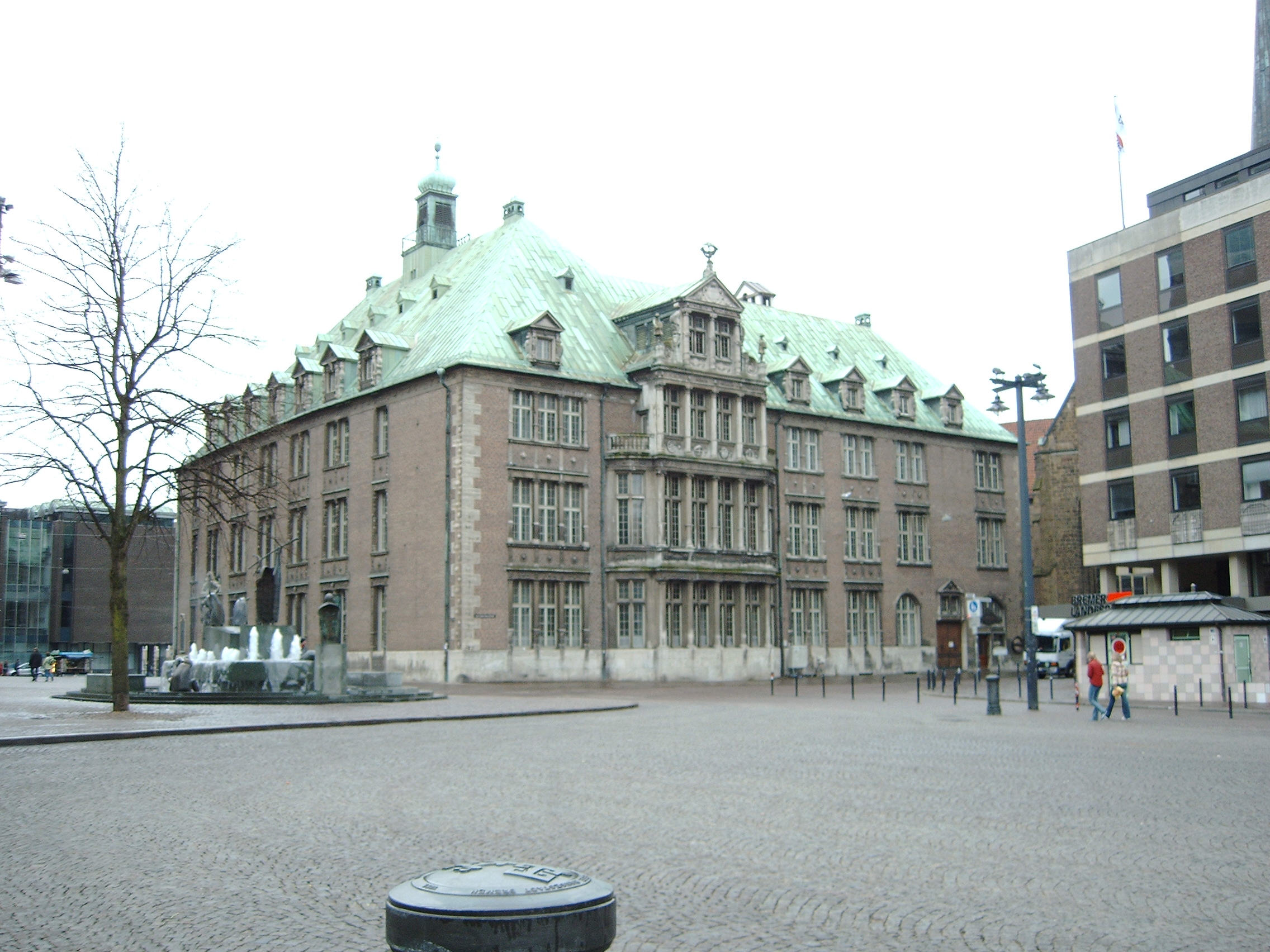
New Town Hall built 1913, Neptune Fountain, on the right the Bremer Landesbank, built 1972

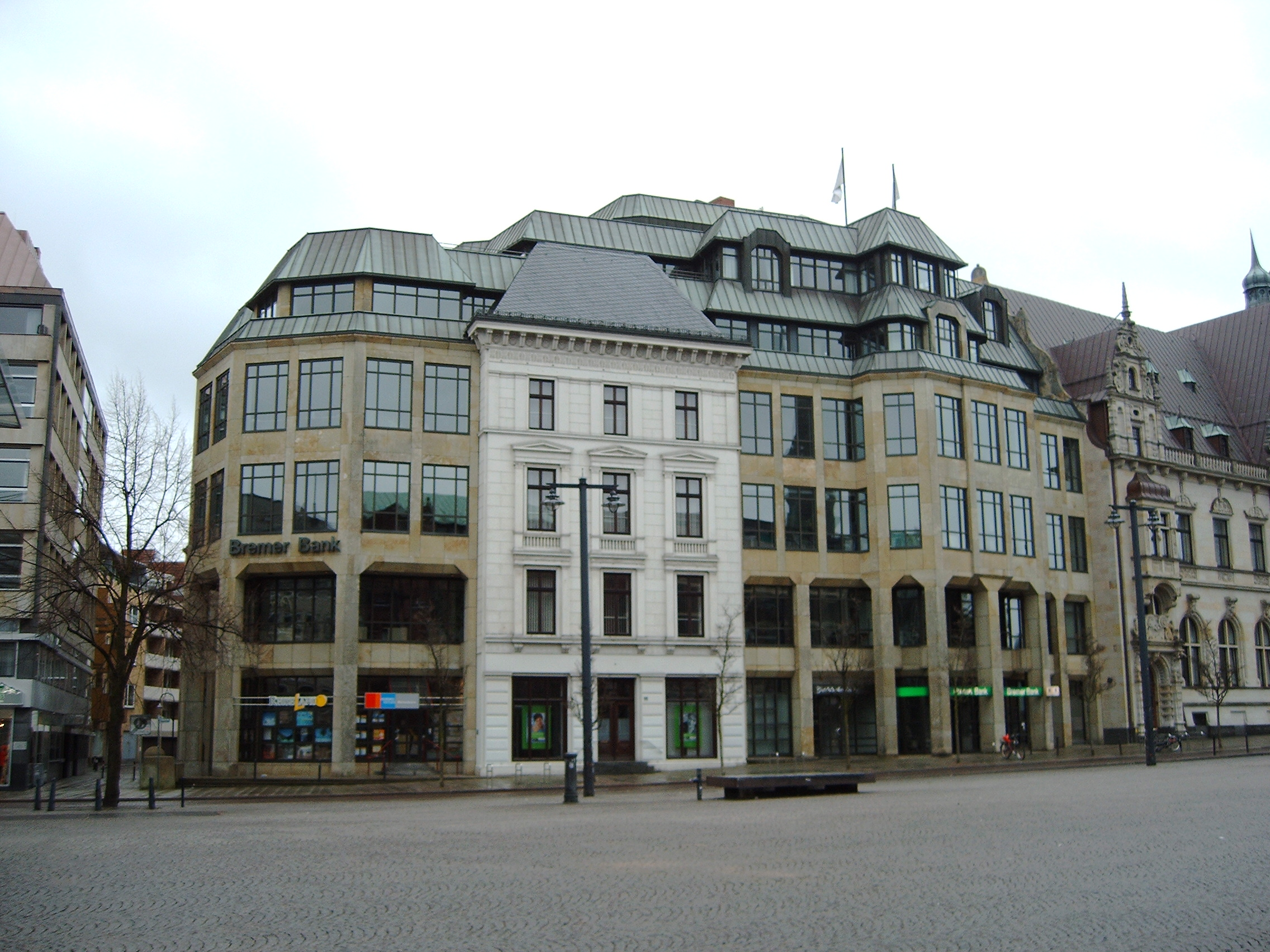
Numbers 10–12 built 1906: formerly Bremer Bank, now Commerzbank

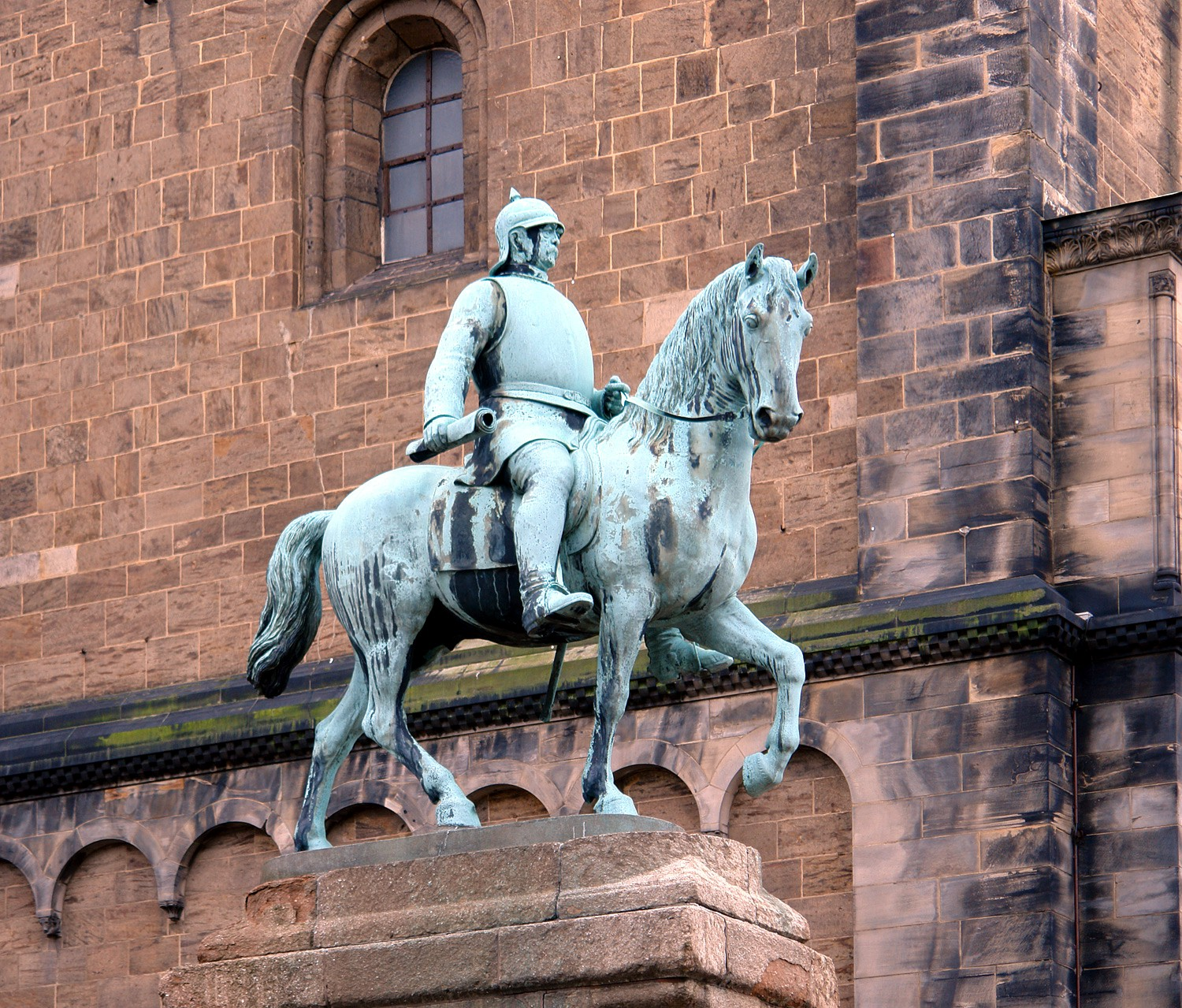
Bismarck's monument erected 1910

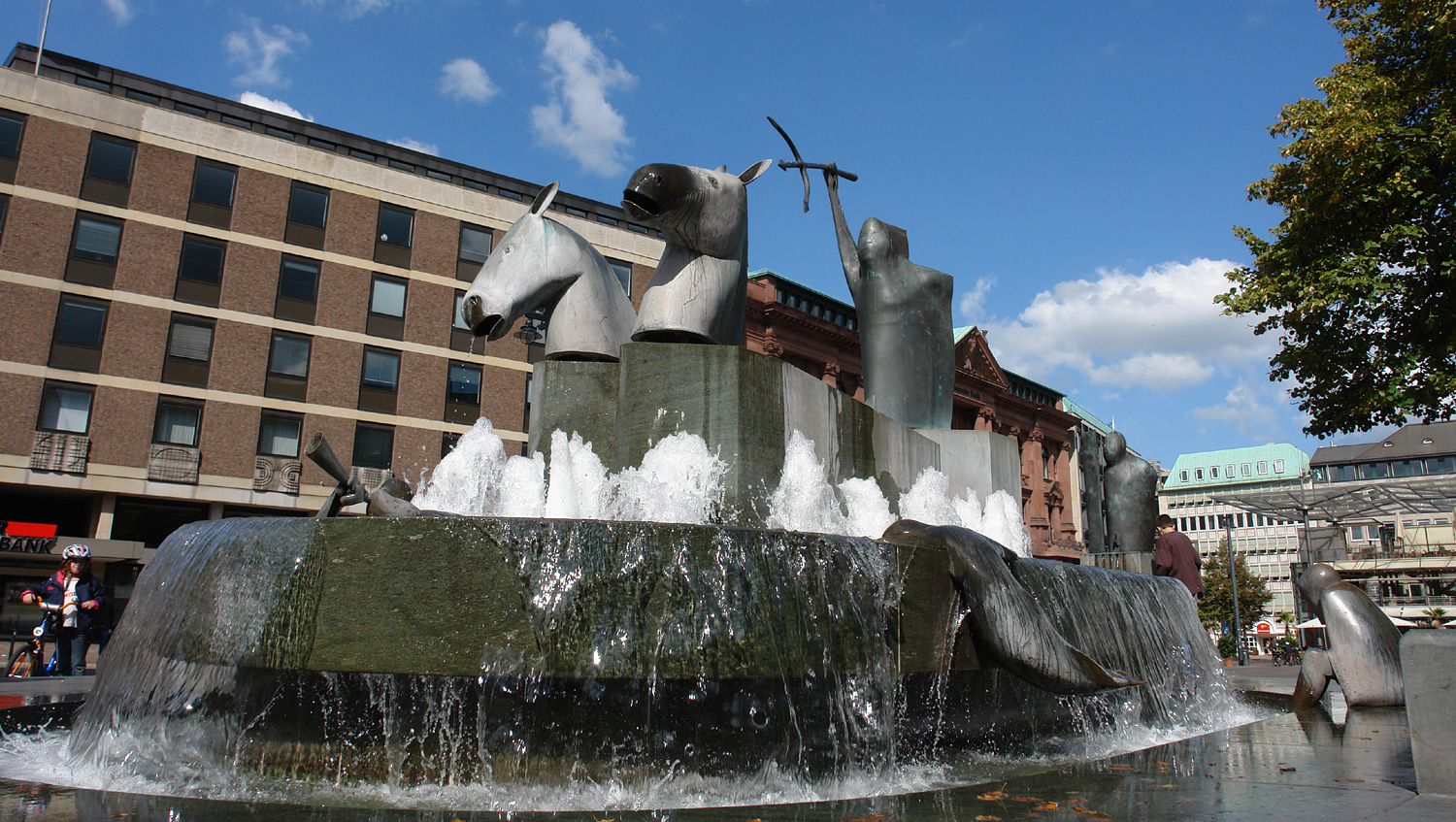
The Neptune Fountain built 1991

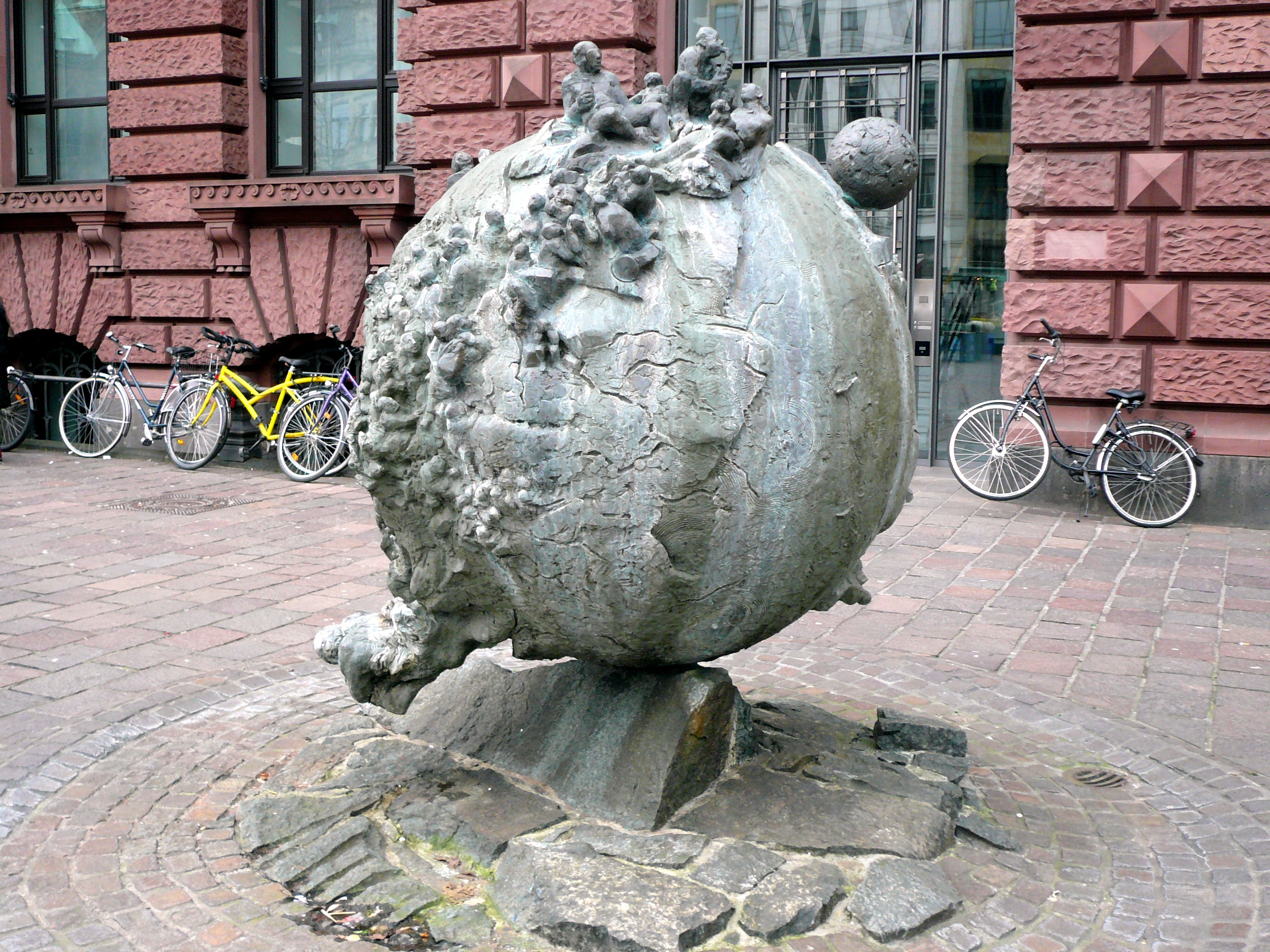
The Global Fountain built 1990

=== The Banks ===
The conversion to a banking hub first began in 1890 when Bernhard Loose built a bank on Unser-Lieben-Frauen-Kirchhof Street. In 1891 the Deutsche Bank built their historicising branch in red sandstone, which they expanded in the 1980s with a new building connected to the old by a passageway. The orphanage beside the cathedral and the neighbouring houses had to make way for the Bremer Bank erected in the Neo-Renaissance style in 1906, which was also substantially expanded in the 1980s.

=== Ambience of the square ===
Even the cathedral changed in appearance. Some time before 1738 a north entrance, the Brauttür (bridal door) was created. The south tower which had been destroyed in the 17th century was able to be rebuilt and both towers received their current sharply pitched roofs in 1893.

From 1880 to 1942 the Willehadus Fountain stood between the cathedral and the town hall. In 1999, the Neptune Fountain was built significantly to the north of the Willehadus Fountain's former location by Waldemar Otto. The Teichmann Fountain also stood on the north side of the square between 1899 and 1940.

The question "ornamental plaza or traffic court?" was raised by the Architects and Engineers Association in 1893 and sent to the council by the chief planner Ludwig Franzius. The response was the square's increasing devotion to traffic; cars and trams crossed the square.

The square received a further transformation in 1909. The simple Stadthaus of 1818 (the successor to the palace) was demolished in 1909. The New Town Hall was built in its place according to the plan of the Munich architect Gabriel von Seidl in the Neo-Renaissance style and was completed in 1913. Since the earlier buildings on the south side of the square had largely disappeared, a wide opening was left to the Marktplatz - an access square (Zwischenplatz). Finally, an equestrian statue dedicated to Otto von Bismarck was installed near the cathedral in 1910.

=== Interwar period ===
After the First World War, efforts to beautify the Domshof continued to be possible at first. The citizens donated 40 silver linden trees in 1922, which were planted around the edges of the square. The centre was sealed with slag. The area received a mosaic pavement in 1925. From 1925 the weekday market was held in the centre of the square three times a week. The market with its stands, the cars parked alongside and the ring of the trams became were all part of the Domshof scene. The weekday markets were banned from 1939 until after the war so that the Domshof could be used for parking.

In March 1933 the Marktplatz and Domshof were packed by citizens listening to a speech by Hitler. During the Second World War a bomb shelter for 2,500 people was created beneath the square. It was used as an underground carpark until a café was built above it in 1999. The silver linden trees were cut down in the process of building the shelter. The Teichmann Fountain and the Willehadus Fountain were melted down as scrap metal in 1940 and 1942.

In a plan prepared by Building Director Gerd Offenberg all buildings on the Domshof except the cathedral and the town hall were to be demolished. This would have created a larger parade ground, to be framed on all sides (even the north) by a single construction. The trams would be diverted to Violenstraße.

== The Domshof today ==
Many of the buildings around the square were destroyed in the Second World War, especially on the northern and eastern sides. However, the cathedral, town hall, Bremer Bank, Deutsche Bank, as well as houses 10 and 21 survived. The Domshof was a US army carpark.

Since 1954 May Day rallies have been held in the Domshof by the trade unions. The 1958 rally attracted 80,000 participants.

The Deutsche Schifffahrtsbank was built in 1953 and the Deutsche Hypothekenbank in 1954 on three vacant lots (Numbers 18-20) following plans by Walter Görig. Before the war this was the location of the Stadt Frankfurt and Zum Lindenhof hotels. The Baroque Caesarian House at Number 21, named after councilman Dr Gerhard Caesar and dating back to 1768 was demolished in 1960. A six-story office building designed by Herbert Anker replaced it, long the location of the Bremer Treuhand. The Deutsche Bank expanded into corner lot 21a in 1965, which had formerly been the location of Heinrich Müller's museum.

1971 saw the erection of the Ibero-America Bank in Numbers 14-16 on the eastern side, yet another bank for the Domshof. Today this building contains office and shopping space. Dietrich and Hermann designed an extension to the Bremer Bank in 1979, with a new wing on vacant lots 10-12. The classicising upper facade of Number 11 was retained. At this time, finally, the trams were removed from the Domshof. The Bremer Landesbank was built in 1983. Only three buildings from before 1800 now remain on the Domshof.

After a rather unsuccessful design competition in 1984, the square was thoroughly renovated in 1990, with new granite paving, some trees and raised flower beds, sandstone slabs on the footpaths, the installation of a tram stop, the Neptune Fountain (1991), the Global Fountain in front of the Deutsche Bank, and an expensive public toilet.

== Monuments and fountains ==
=== Current ===
- Bismarck Equestrian statue a bronze statue near the cathedral by Adolf von Hildebrand, with a plinth of Salzburg marble by Carl Sattler, installed 1910
- Nebtune fountain by Waldemar Otto, 1991
- Owr Planet or the Global Fountain, in Bronze by Bernd Altenstein, 1996

=== No longer extant ===
- Gustavus Adolphus Monument, gift of 30 Bremen burghers, standing statue of king Gustav II Adolf in bronze by Benedict Fogelberg, plinth of granite by Alexander Schröder, stood from 4 September 1856 until melted down for scrap metal on the 12 June 1942.
- Teichmann Fountain, a boat with Mercury, Neptune and Nixies in bronze by Rudolf Maison was a gift of Kaufmann Gustav Adolph Teichmann (died 1892) to replace an old well and stood from 28 November 1899 until melted down for scrap metal in 1940.
- Willehadus Fountain in honour of the first bishop of Bremen Willehadus, between the town hall and the cathedral, bronze and plinth by Richard Neumann, stood from 1880 until melted down for scrap metal in 1940.

== The sweeping of the cathedral steps ==
The sweeping of the cathedral steps is an ancient custom of Bremen. Men who are still unmarried on their 30th birthday must sweep the steps in front of the cathedral until they are kissed by a virgin.

== Cultural heritage management ==
The following buildings are now included in the cultural heritage management plan:

- The Town Hall of Bremen and the New Town Hall
- Bremen Cathedral
- The cathedral block with rectory, carvings and concert house.
- Domshof 8/9: Bremer Bank built 1904.
- Domshof 11: Facade of Schmidt House, former residential building erected in 1857
- Domshof 25: Deutsche Bank am Domshof built 1891.

== The Buildings ==
Nr.	Current building	Date	Architect
1–7	Cathedral	1060	-
8; 9	Bremer Bank/Commerzbank	1904	Albert Dunkel; Diedrich Tölken
10; 12	Bremer Bank/Commerzbank	1979	Dietrich/Herrmann
11	Bank-Facade; Schmidt House	1857; 1982	Dietrich; Herrmann
14; 15; 16	Ibero-Amerika Bank; Now office buildings	1971	Hans Budde
17	Deutsche Schifffahrtsbank	1953	Fritz Schumacher; Walter Görig
18; 19; 20	Deutsche Hypothekenbank	1954	Walter Görig/Erdmann
21	Office building of Bremer Treuhand	1960	Herbert Anker
21 a	Deutsche Bank am Domshof	1965	Günther Albrecht
22; 22; 23; 24; 25	Deutsche Bank	1891	Design: Martens; Extension: Rauschenberg
26; 30	Bremer Landesbank	1972	Gerhard Müller-Menckens/Rehberg
Ø	New Town Hall	1913	Gabriel von Seidl

== Bibliography ==
- Wilhelm Lührs, Der Domshof. Geschichte eines bremischen Platzes. Bremen: Hauschild Verlag, 1987, ISBN 3-920699-87-4.
