= St. Catherine's Monastery, Bremen =

Coordinates: 53°04′40″N 8°48′31″E

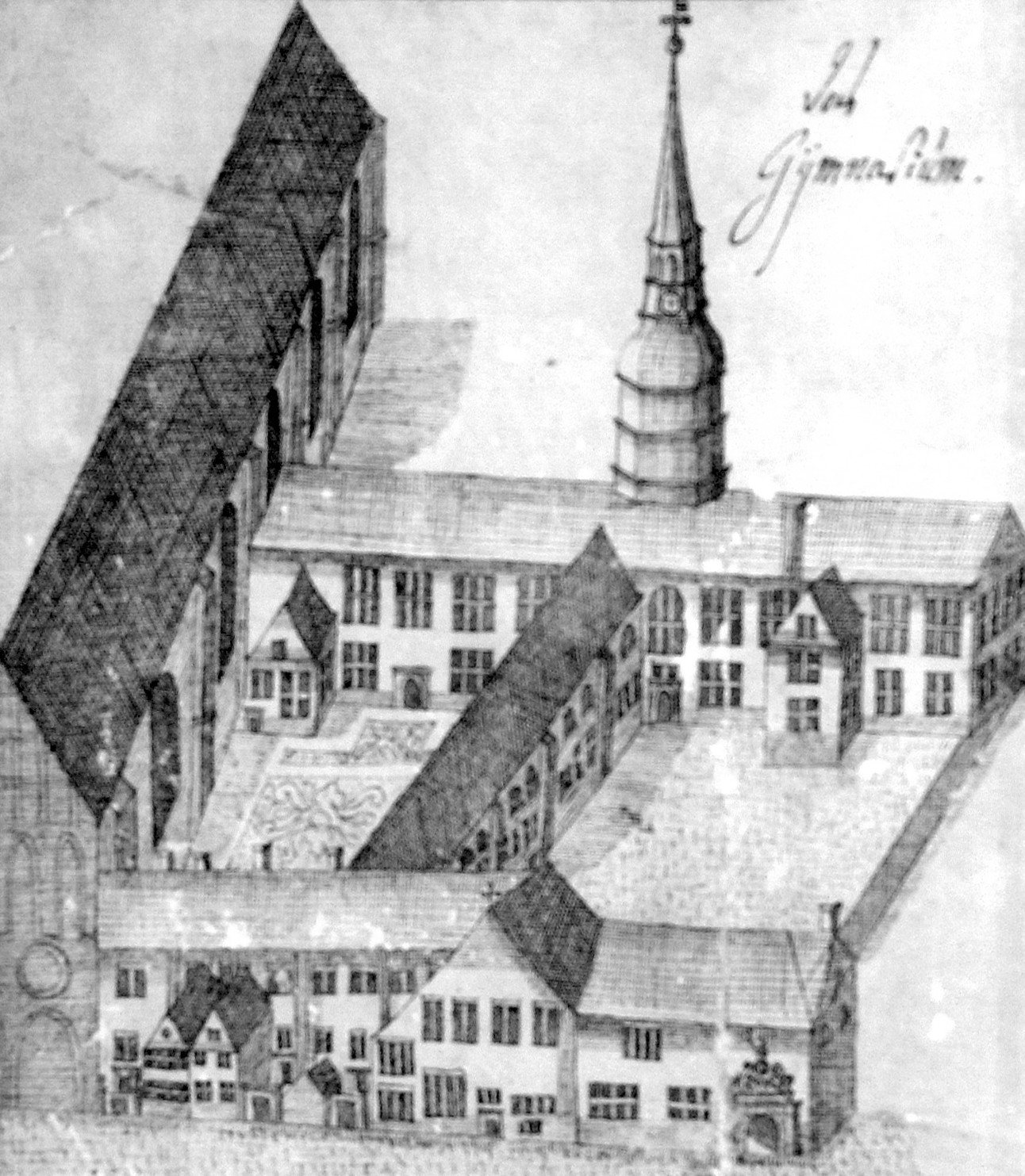
The grammar school in the former monastery, 1734

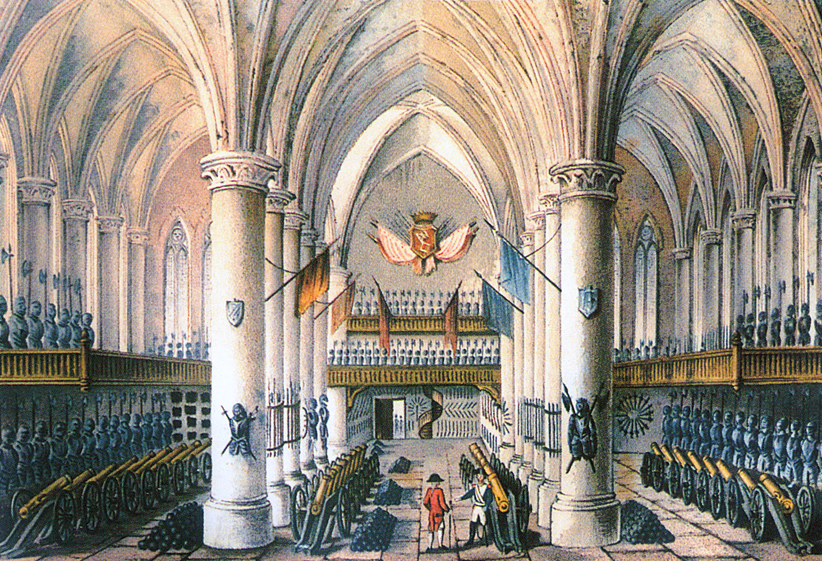
Jacob Ephraim Polzin: St. Catherine's Church as an arsenal

== History ==
The brick Gothic building was Germany's second Dominican monastery after St. Catherine's Monastery in Frankfurt. Its imposing church was consecrated to Saint Catherine in 1285. The monastery was extended in 1400 but was closed in 1528 as a result of the Reformation. The grammar school known as Schola Bremensis or Gymnasium Illustre moved into the premises and, from 1660, was served by the Bibliotheca Bremensis, the extensive library which was established there. In the early 19th century, the church was the city's arsenal as can be seen from Jacob Ephraim Polzin's painting. For a short period from 1900 to 1905 it even became home to the city's historical museum with Johann Focke's collection. It was later used by local merchants as a storehouse. After suffering serious damage during the Second World War, the church was demolished in 1960.

== Remains ==
Today, traces of the monastery can be found in the multi-storey car park designed by Carsten Schröck in the early 1970s. In the restaurant at No. 7 Katharinenklosterhof, once known as the "Refectorium", remains of the refectory, cloister, and the chapter room of the monastery can be seen. This history is recorded on an information plaque in the Katharinenpassage. The Katharinenpassage was built in 1984 to a design by Rosengart, Busse and partners.
