= Waldemar Otto =

Polish-born German sculptor (1929–2020)

Waldemar Otto (30 March 1929 – 8 May 2020) was a Polish-born German sculptor, known for his torso studies.

== History ==
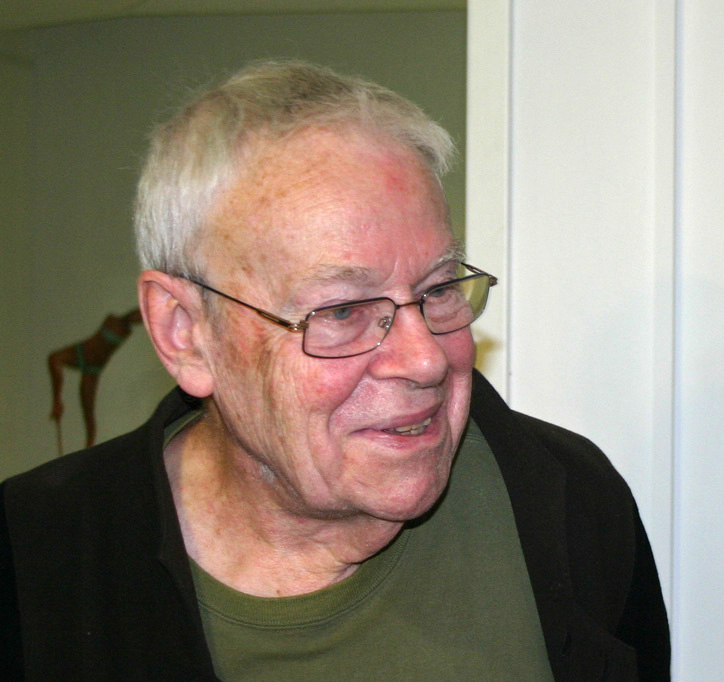
Waldemar Otto, 2013

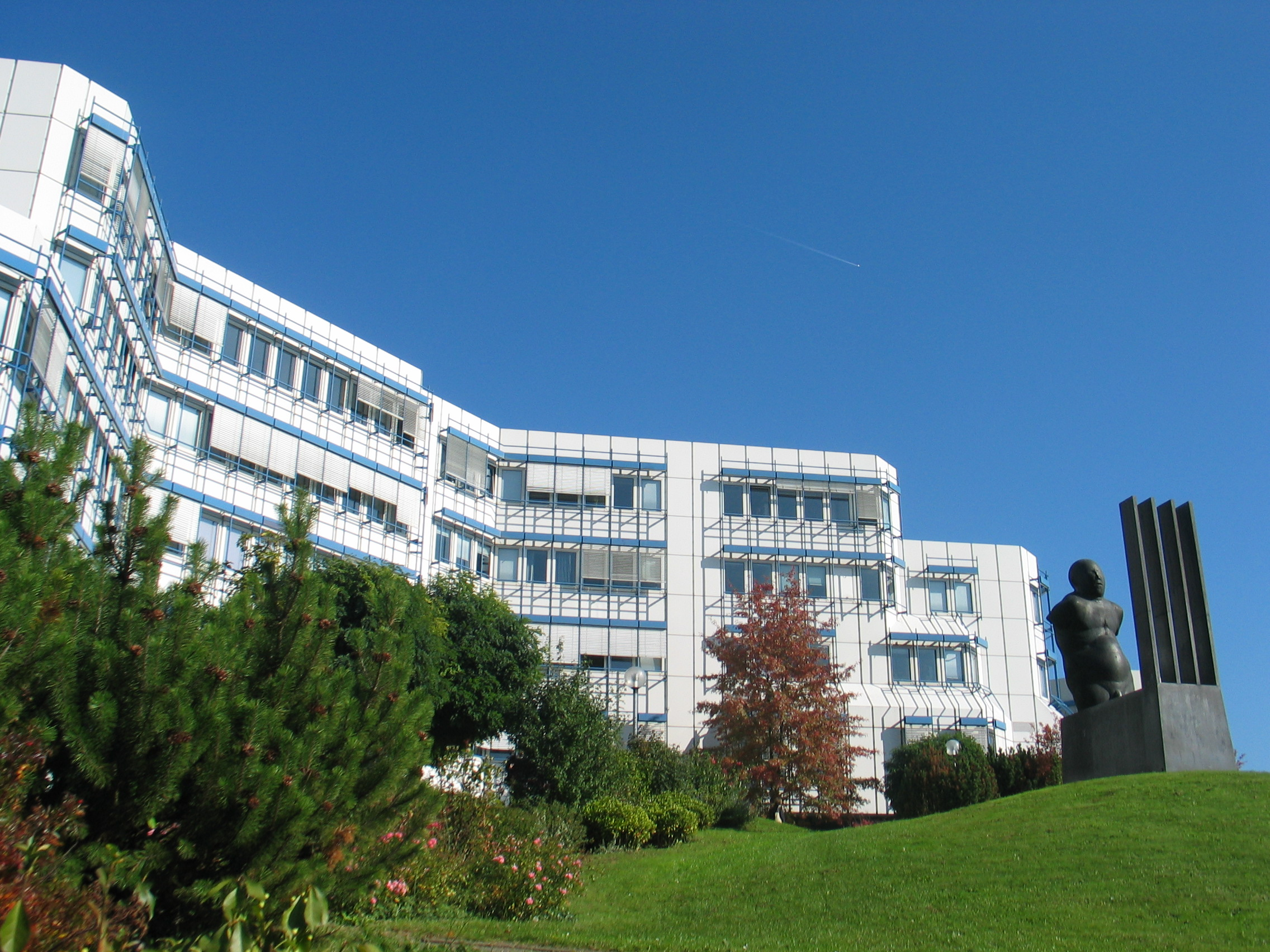
Torso vor Raster at Trier University

Otto was born in Petrikau, Poland, a son of Heinrich Otto and Theodora Otto née Koschelik.

He was educated at the Berlin University of the Arts (Hochschule der Künste) in Berlin.

In 1948 he enrolled at the Academy of Fine Arts in Berlin, and in 1957 he was a prizewinner at the Great Berlin Art Exhibition.

In 1973 he was appointed professor at the University of the Arts in Bremen, and there founded the Bremer sculpture school. In 1976 he left for Worpswede, Germany, where he lived, worked and, after a long illness, died.

Many of his works had been purchased for public spaces, including the Torso vor Raster (1987) at the University of Trier. A major retrospective of his work was held at the Gerhard Marcks building in Bremen in 2009, to coincide with his 80th birthday.
