= Friedrich Wilhelm Rauschenberg =

German architect

- Born: 1 December 1853; Bremen
- Died: 28 September 1935 (aged 81); Bremen

Friedrich Wilhelm Rauschenberg (1 December 1853 – 28 September 1935) was a German architect active in Bremen, Germany.

== Life ==
Rauschenberg was born in Bremen in 1853 and attended the local secondary school. After studying architecture, he opened offices in his home town offering designs in the Neo-Renaissance style. In 1891, he and Wilhelm Martens saw the completion of the Historicist styled Deutsche Bank building in Bremen.

In 1893, he spent a decade away, first in Munich and then in Karlsruhe. He returned in 1903 and set up in partnership, creating designs more in the Art Nouveau style.

Rauschenberg died in Bremen.
