= Rhododendron-Park Bremen =

Botanical garden

Coordinates: 53°5′30″N 8°53′10″E

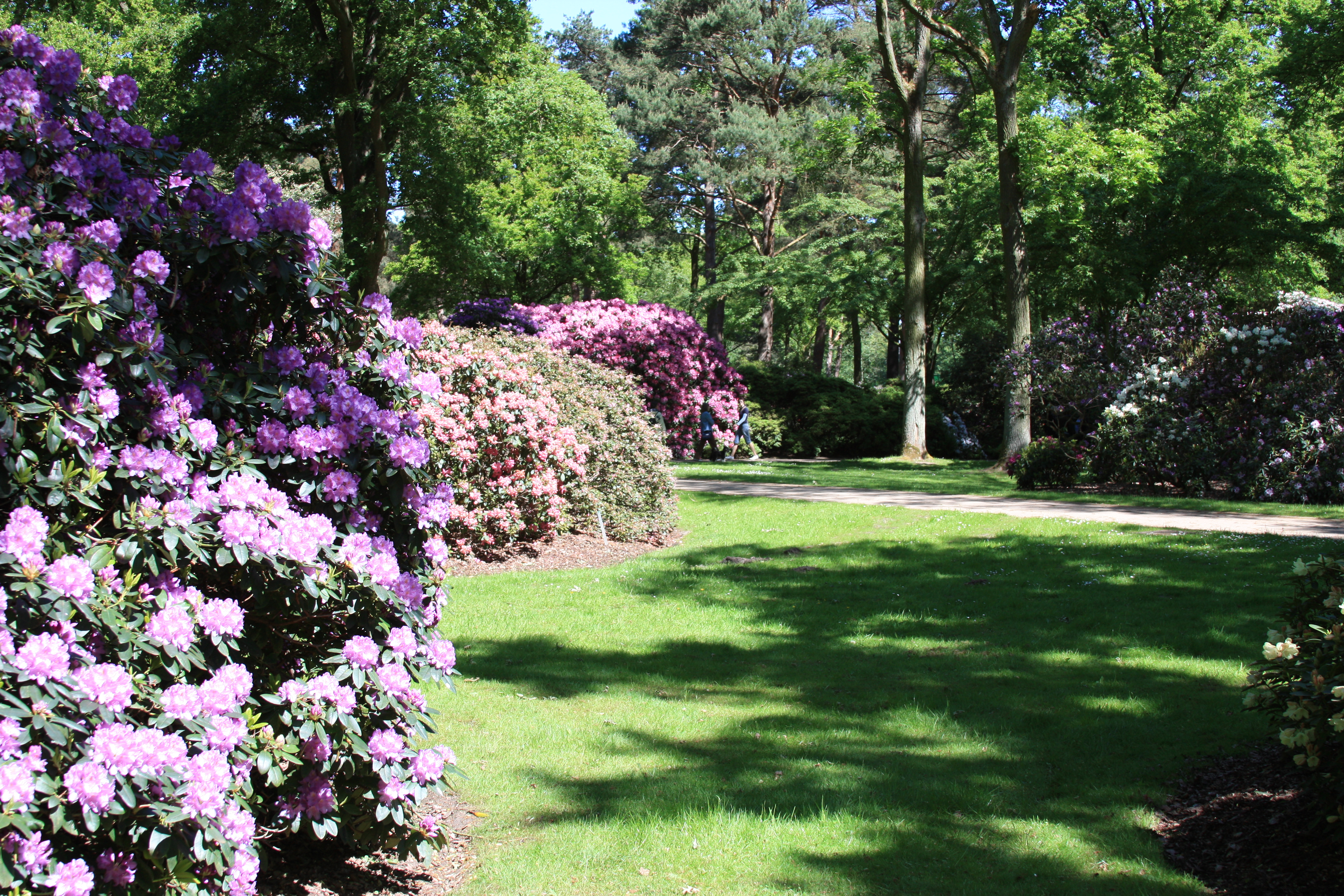
Rhododendron-Park Bremen

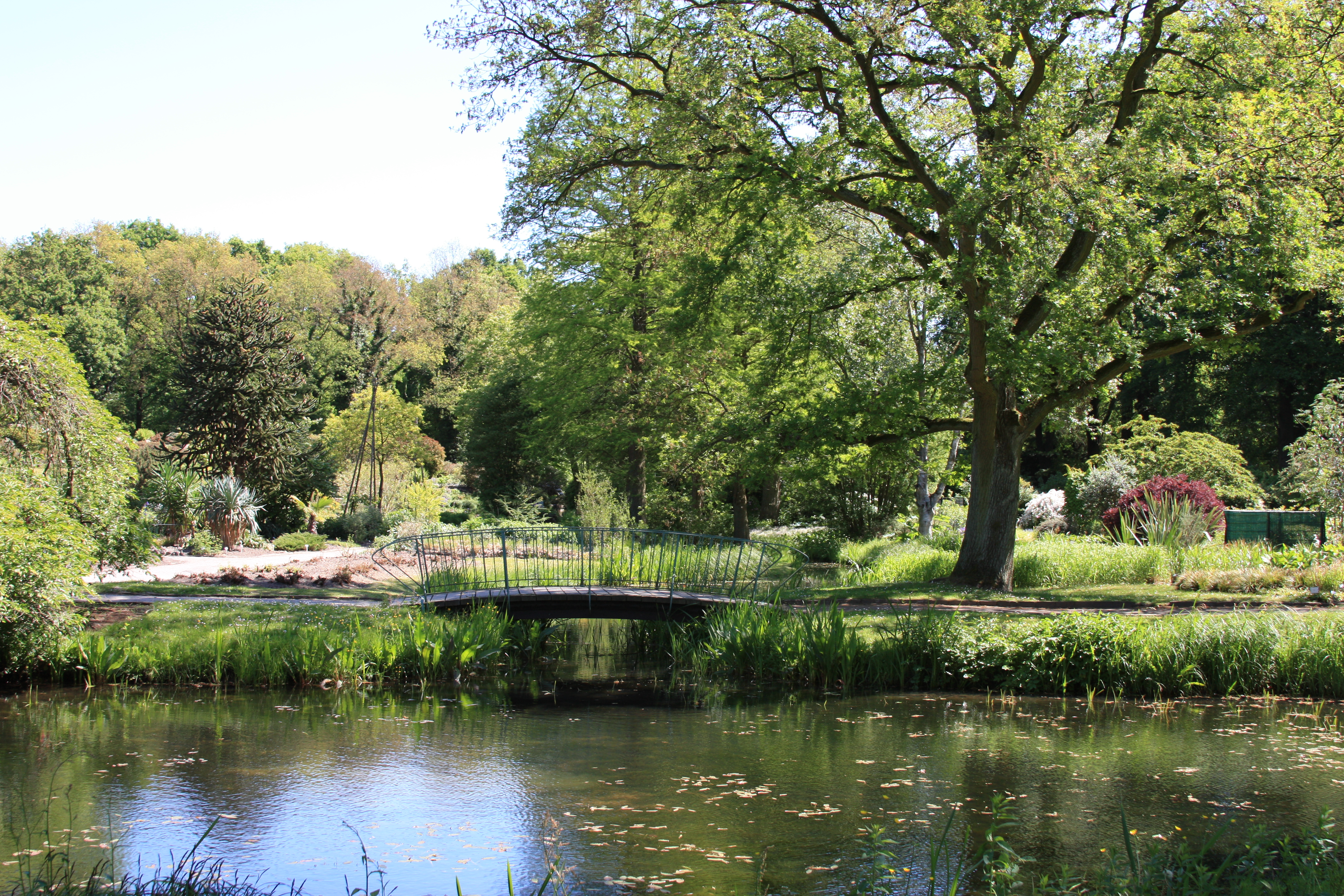
Rhododendron-Park Bremen

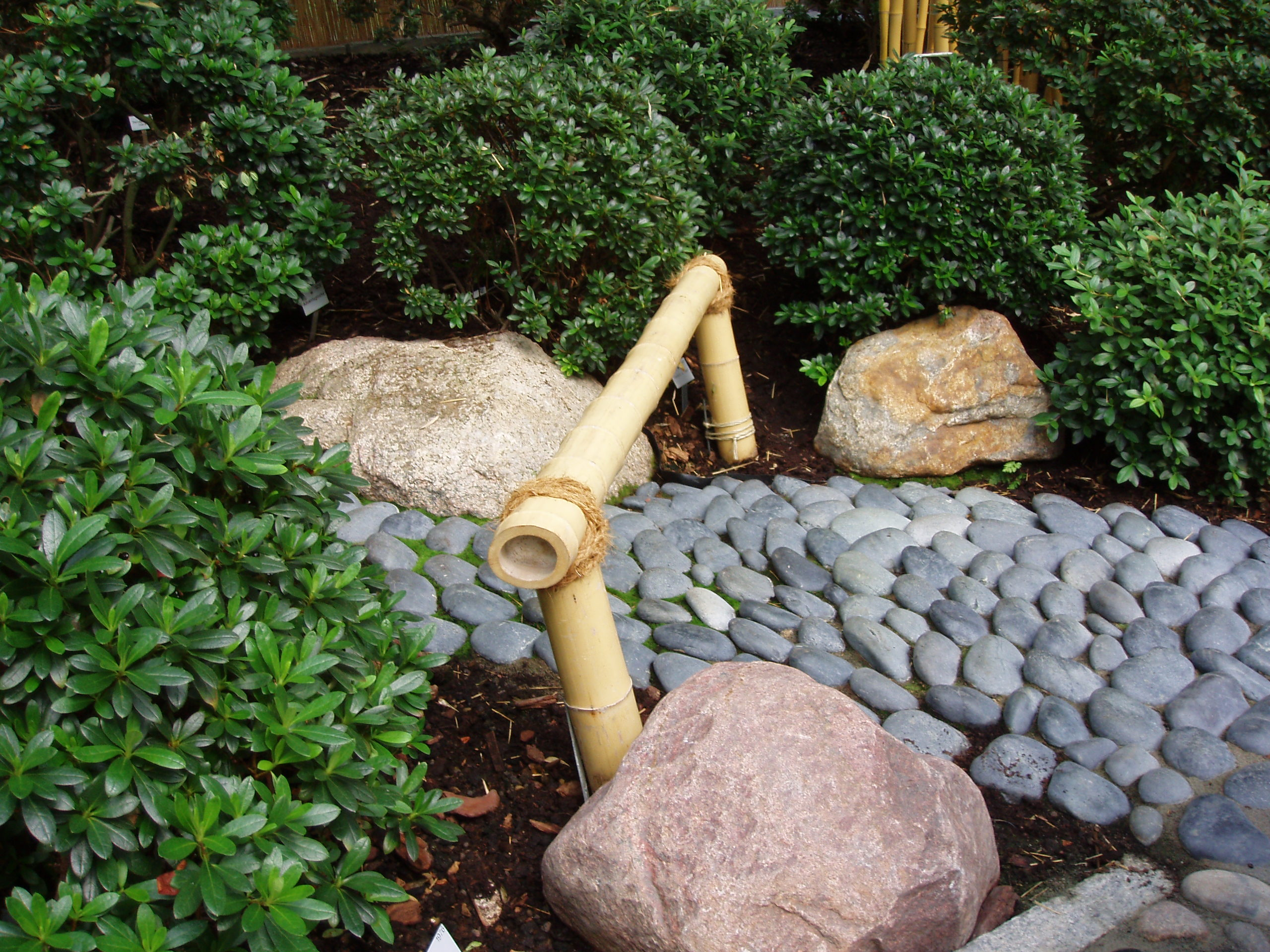
Japanese garden in Botanika

The Rhododendron-Park Bremen (46 hectares), also known as the Rhododendron-Park und Botanischer Garten Bremen, is the biggest collection of rhododendrons and azaleas worldwide, as well as a substantial botanical garden (3.2 hectares), located in Bremen, Germany. It is open daily; park admission is free but a fee is charged for the nature center Botanika.

The botanical garden dates to 1905 when it was created by businessman Franz Schütte at a different site (1905 Osterdeich, 3 hectares). This original garden was organized geographically, with plants from the Orient, Mexico, and the Caucasus, as well as collections of crop plants, medicinal herbs, native plants, and poisonous plants. It remained privately held until 1935 when it became city property, and was transferred to its current location within the Rhododendron Park over the next few years. Today's garden was completed in 1949-1950.

The park itself began in 1933 at the initiative of the German Rhododendron Society on former farmland and forest, opening to the public in 1937. Its Botanika facility, described as Germany's largest nature center, opened in 2003. In 2007 ownership of the park was transferred to a nonprofit foundation.

== Azaleas and rhododendrons ==
The park's azalea and rhododendron collections are as follows:

- Azalea park - a large landscaped park with streams and lawns, displaying azaleas under old beech and oak trees. Collections include wild species from North America, and historic and current cultivars from the Czech Republic, Germany, and the United States.
- Rhododendron forest - an old, densely vegetated part of the park, with the first rhododendrons planted in 1936.
- Rhododendron park - more than 2,000 varieties of rhododendrons and azaleas.
- New cultivars - new varieties of rhododendrons by German breeders, renewed every 5 years with the assistance of the Deutschen Rhododendron-Gesellschaft (DRG). Most recent plantings were in 2007-2008.

== Botanical garden ==
The park's botanical garden contains the following collections:

- Alpine garden
- Geographical areas - plants from the Americas, Asia, Australia and New Zealand, and the Balkans.
- Heath garden - Ericaceae and Calluna varieties.
- Indigenous flora - approximately 1000 of the 2000 species indigenous to northwest Germany, of which collection about 200 are on the current Red List of endangered plant species for Lower Saxony and Bremen.
- Medicinal and useful plants - about 400 taxa of medicinal plants (one of Germany's largest collections), and about 200 taxa of crop plants.
- Rhododendron rockery - rhododendron species from the Alps, Himalayas, and mountains of China and Japan.
- Shade plants

== Other gardens and park areas ==
- Bonsai Garden - a dry Zen garden with bonsai.
- Botanika - Asian exhibit displaying the diversity of woody species, including rhododendrons from Nepal, Tibet, Yunnan, and Burma, as well as statues from Southeast Asia, prayer wheels, a Chinese tea pavilion, and what is described as the largest Buddha statue outside Asia.
- Rose garden - 230 rose varieties.
- Scent garden - roses, and aromatic herbs such as thyme and lavender.

== See also ==
- List of botanical gardens in Germany
