= Botanika =

Garden in Germany

Coordinates: 53°05′37″N 8°53′10″E

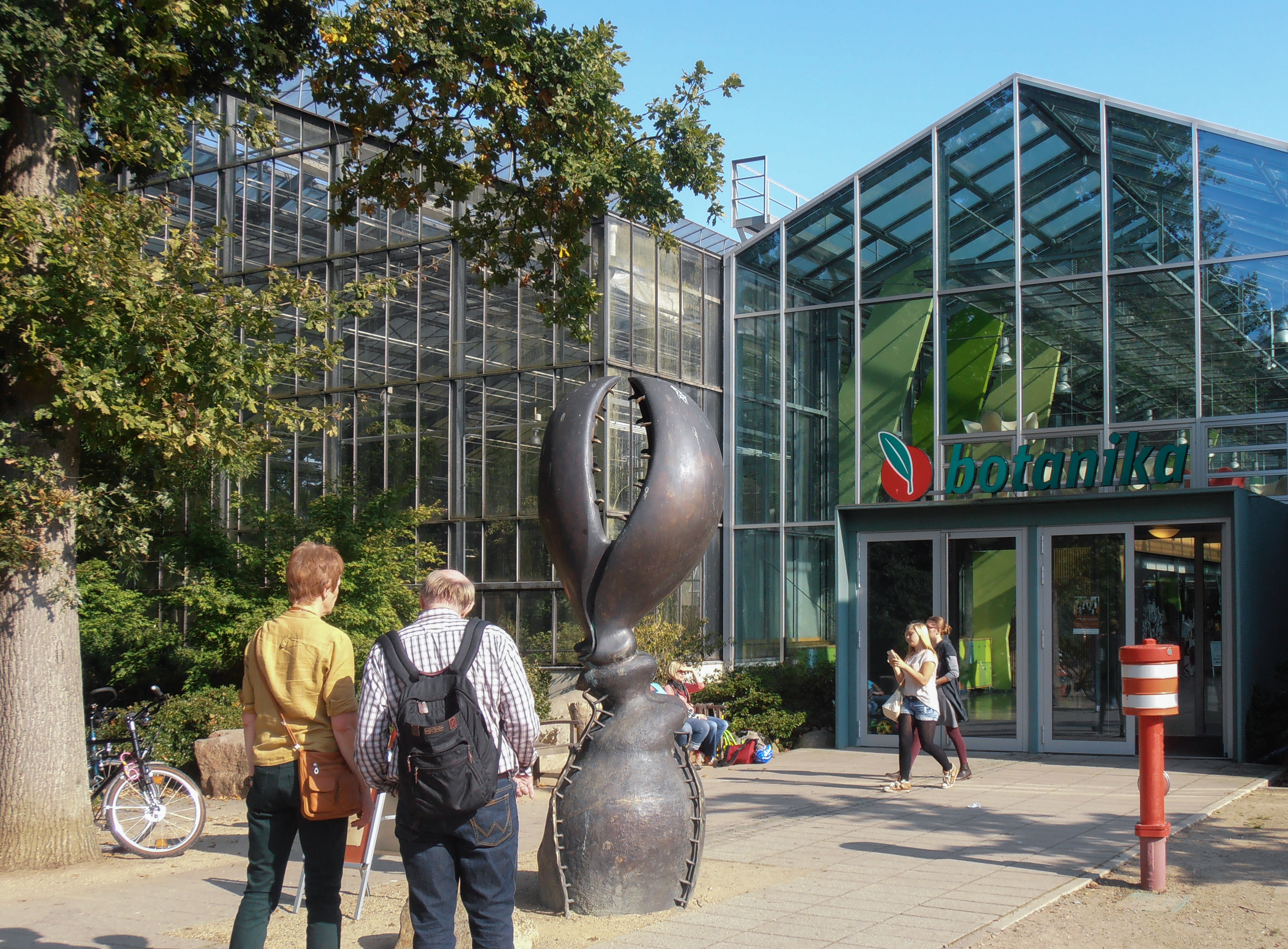
Entrance

Botanika is an indoor botanical garden with science center, in the Rhododendron-Park Bremen. The greenhouses opened in the year 2003 and show primarily azaleas and rhododendrons. Together with the surrounding park, it contains the largest rhododendron collection in the world, featuring roughly 650 species and 3500 varieties.

== Greenhouses and Discovery Centre ==
The four major greenhouses are divided into the regions of Japan, Borneo, the Himalayas, as well as a tropical butterfly house. The facilities present several asiatic landscapes, along with native animals such as lar gibbons, common hill mynas or kois. Smaller greenhouses show special exhibitions, which change every few months. Since August 2017, the greenhouses are home to the 2.4-meter-tall (7.9 ft) "Buddha for Europe", a gift by the 14th Dalai Lama as a symbol for world peace.

The "Discovery Centre" is a two stories tall interactive science centre. It contains over 80 different exhibits about plants and animals, various terrariums as well as a reef aquarium.

== Gallery ==
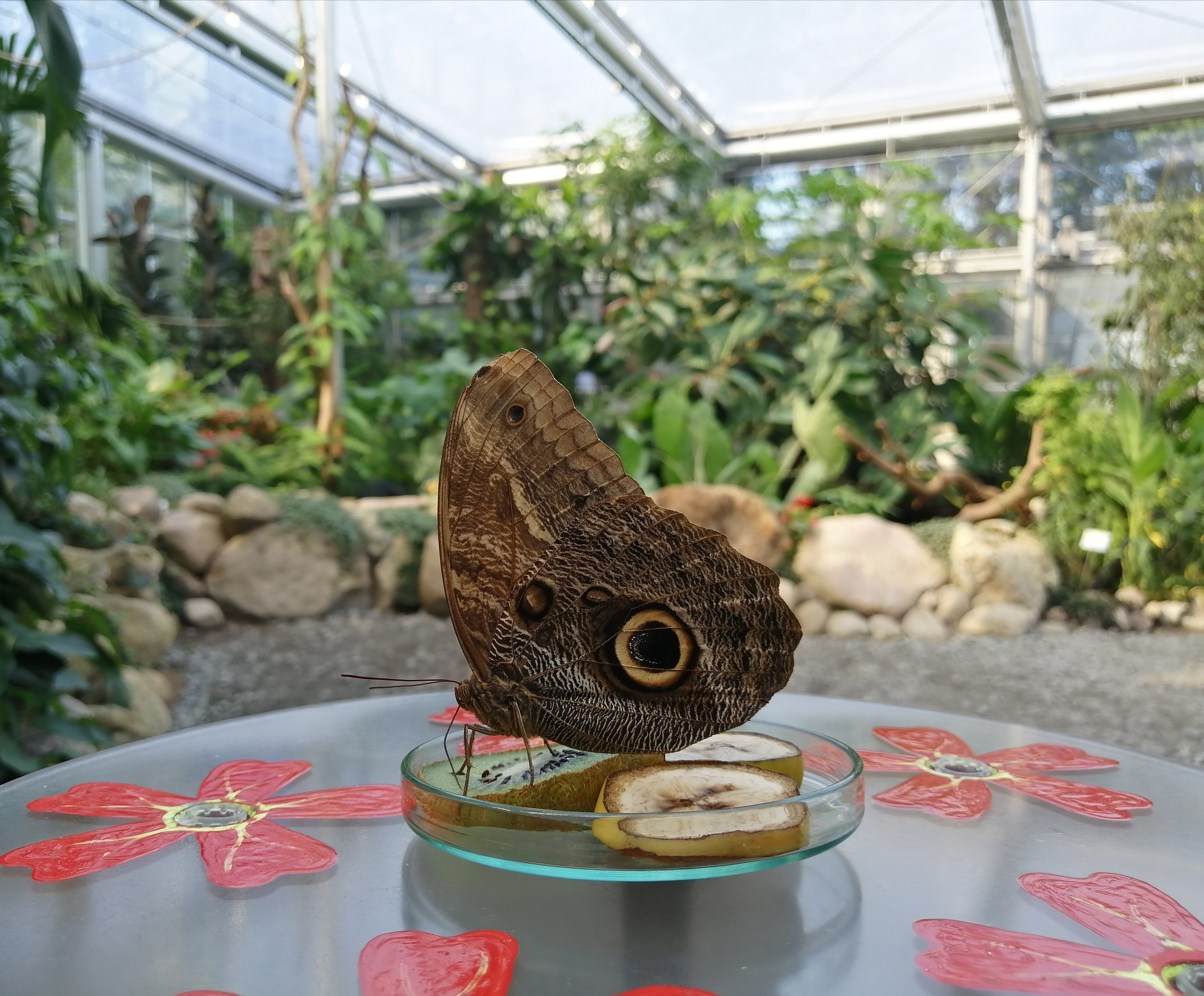
Owl butterfly inside the tropical house

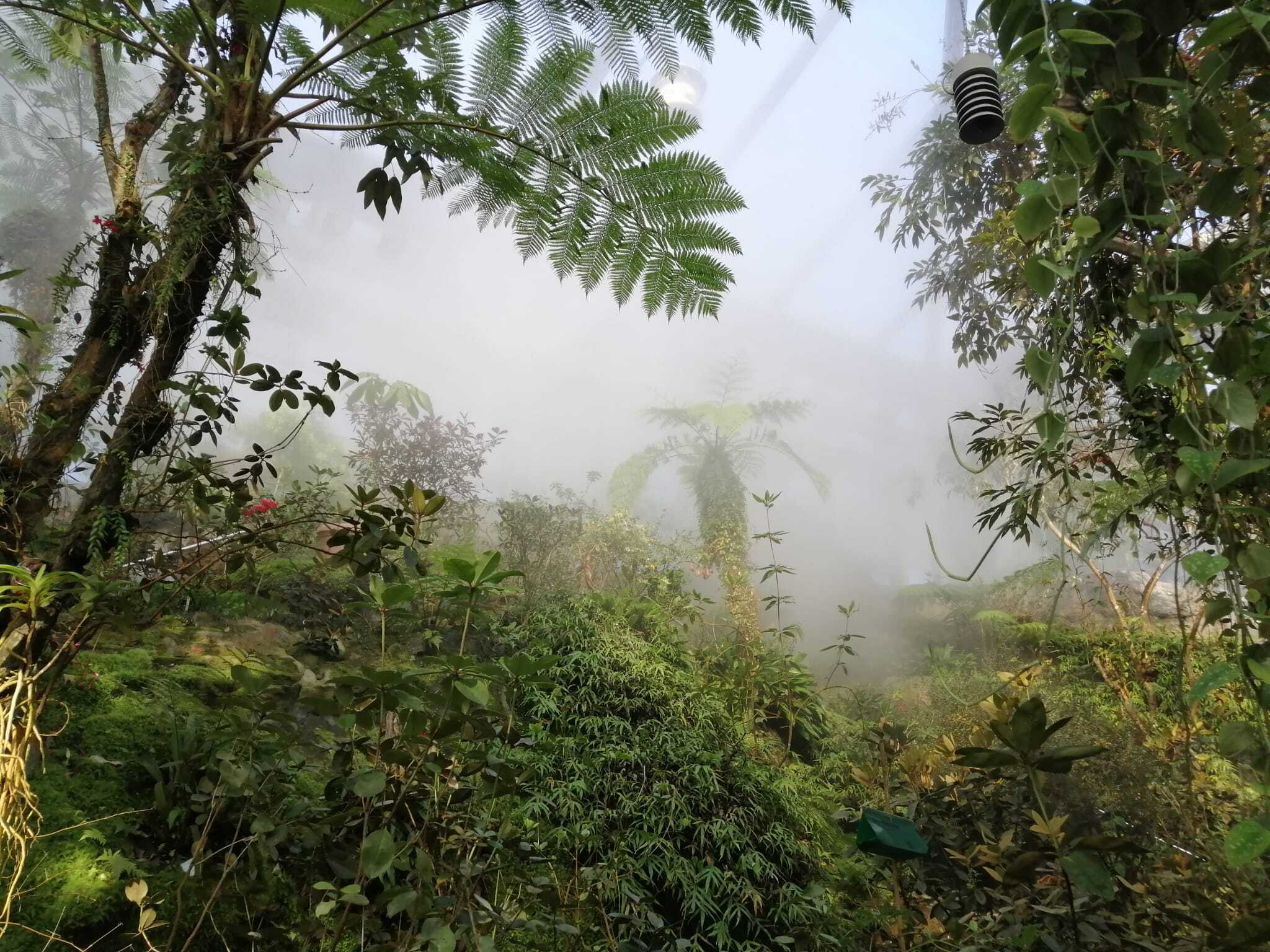
Borneo

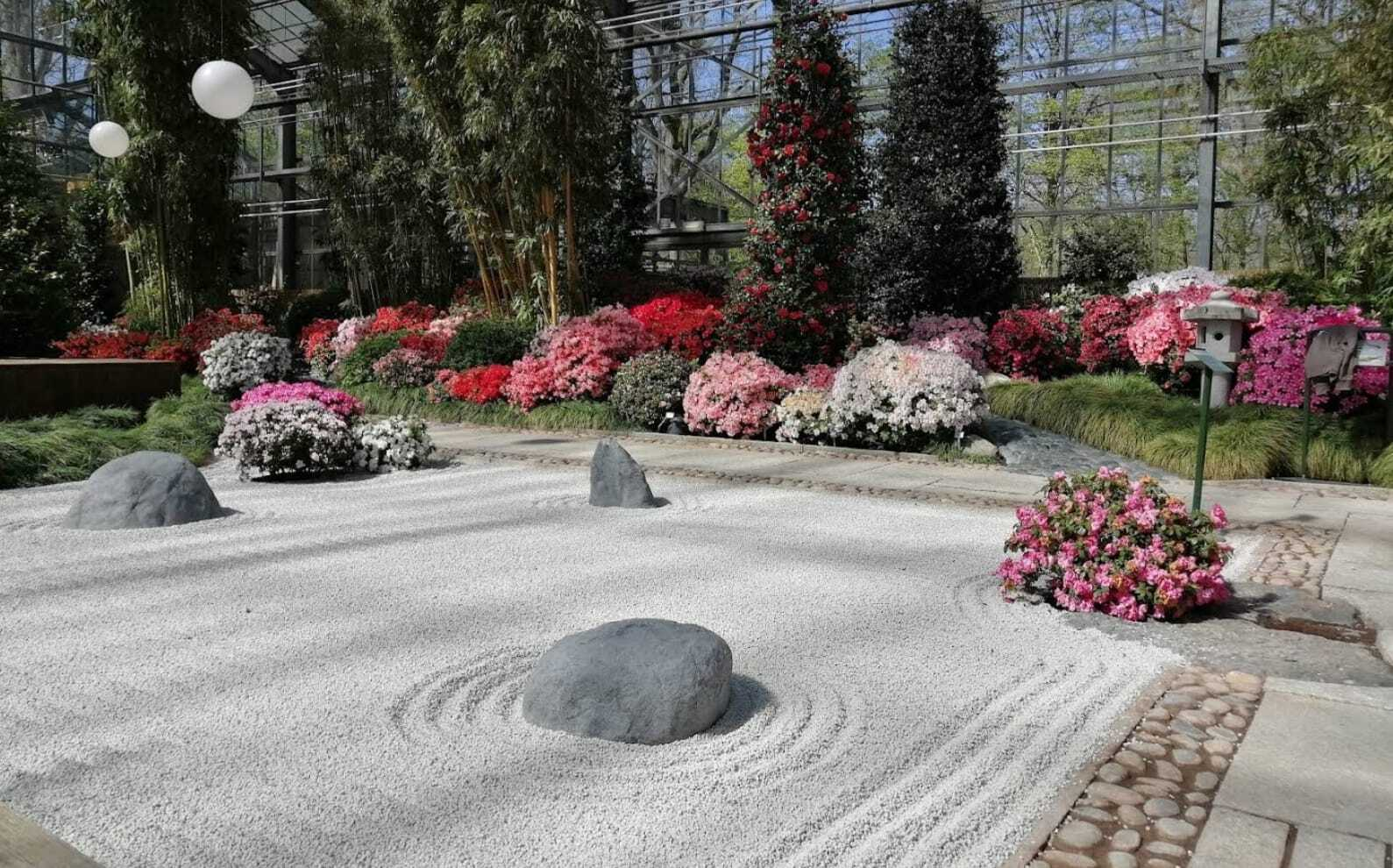
Japanese garden

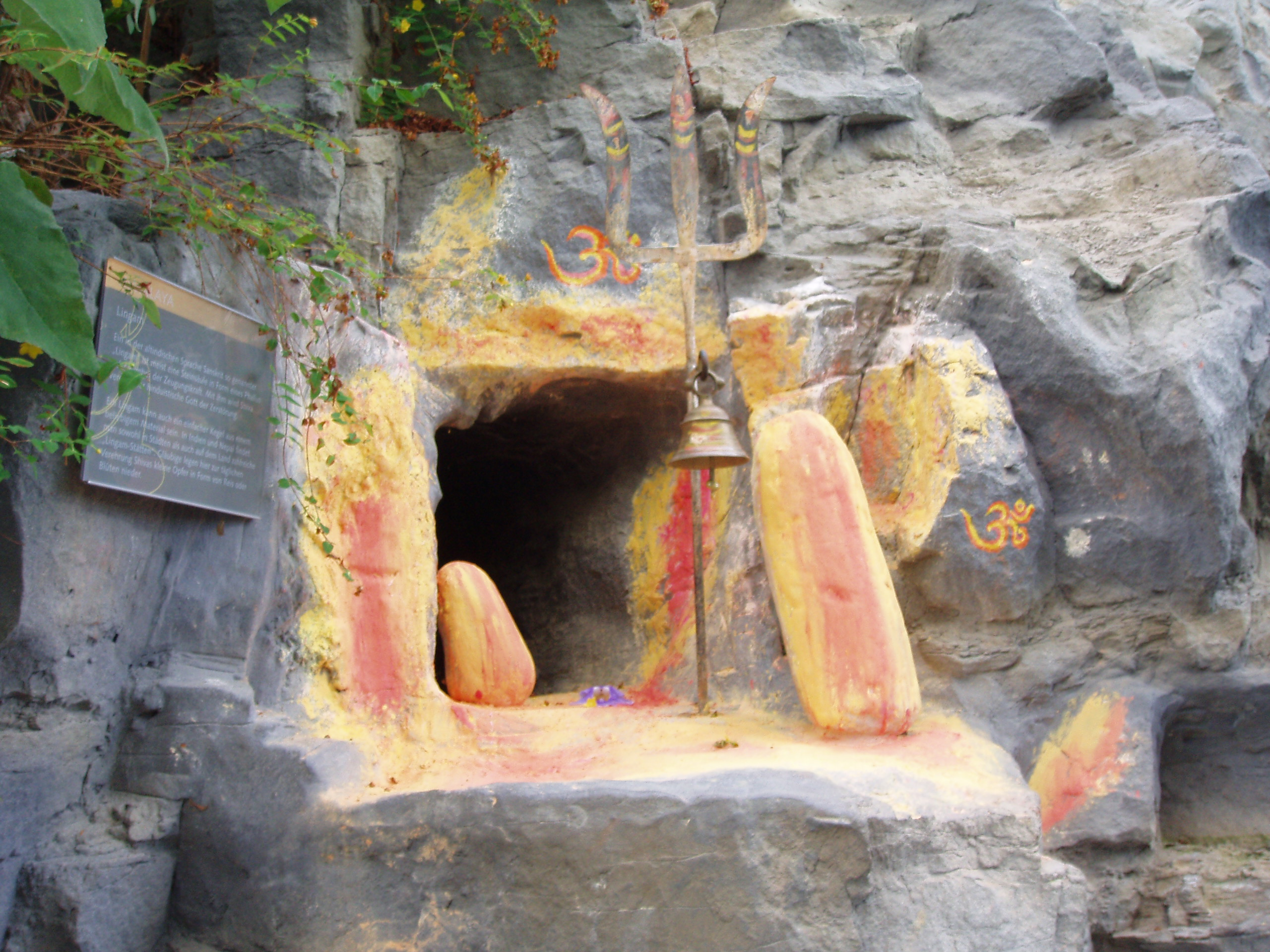
Lingam inside the Himalayan greenhouse

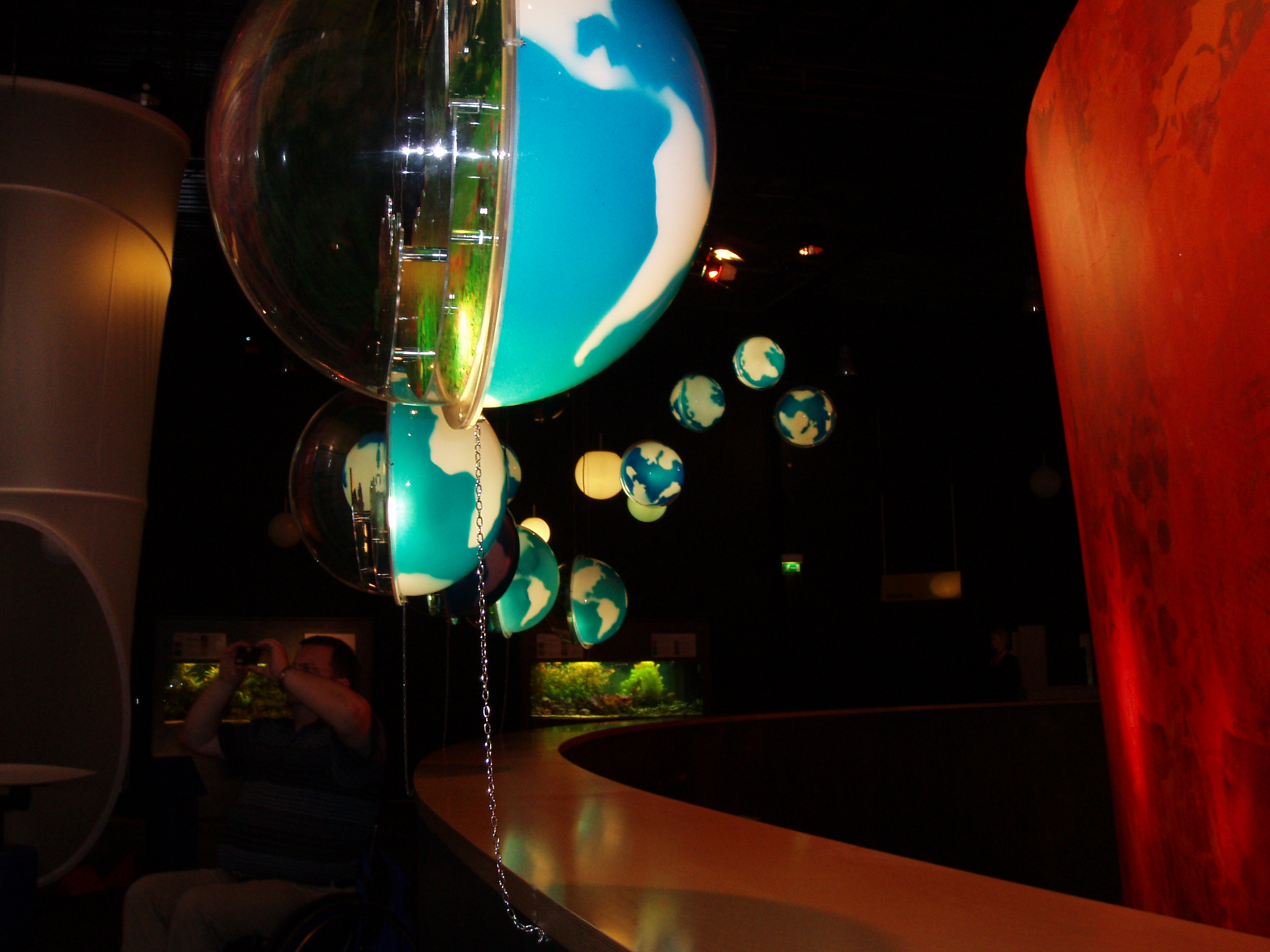
Discovery Centre

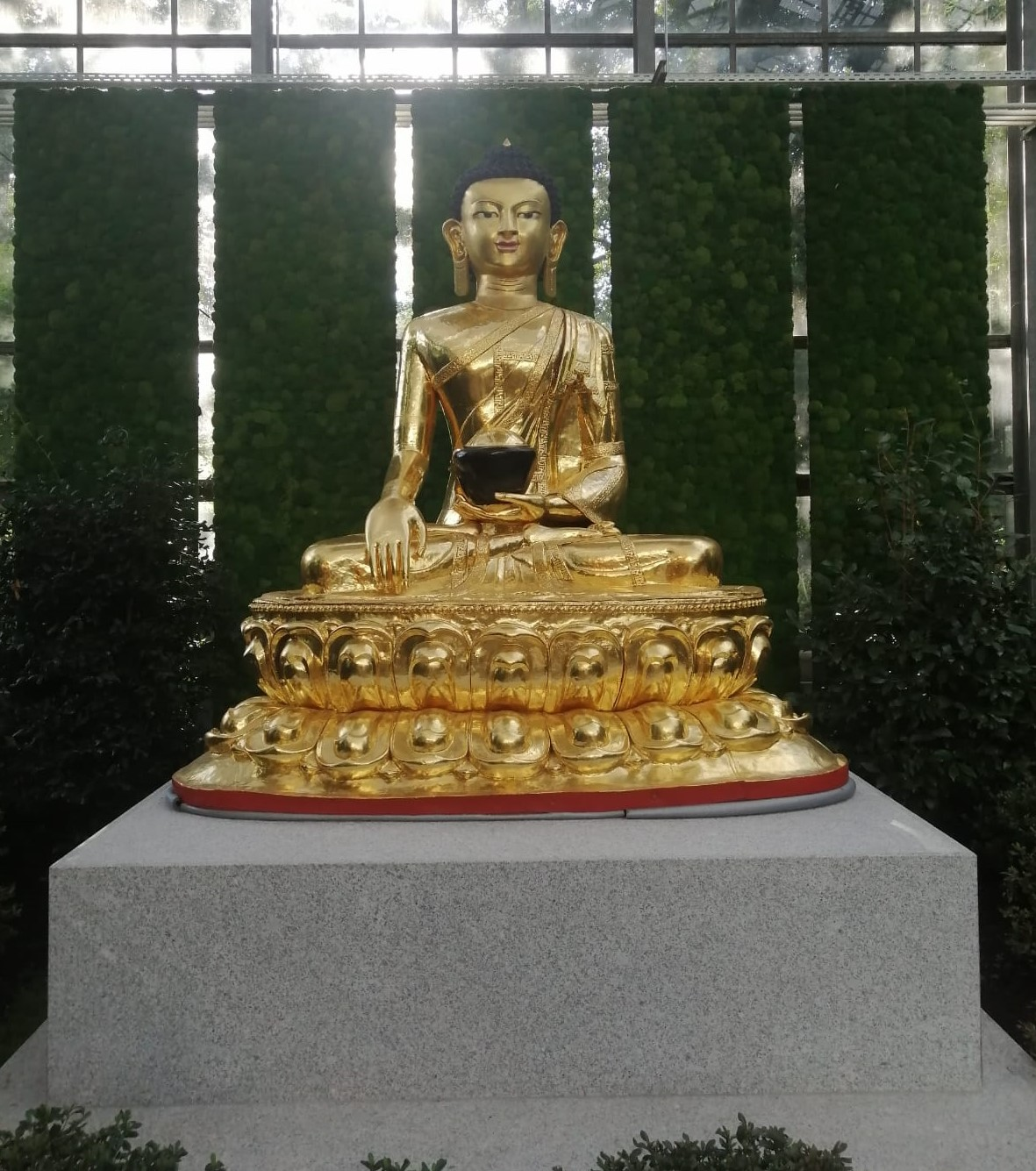
European Peace Buddha
