= List of elections in 1975 =

The following elections occurred in the year 1975.

== Africa ==
- 1975 Cameroonian presidential election
- 1975 Cape Verdean parliamentary election
- 1975 Ivorian general election
- 1975 Liberian general election
- 1975 Malagasy constitutional referendum
- 1975 Mauritanian parliamentary election
- 1975 São Tomé and Príncipe legislative election
- 1975 South African presidential election
- 1975 Tanzanian general election
- 1975 Zairean parliamentary election

== Asia ==
- 1975 Iranian legislative election
- 1975 Kuwaiti general election
- 1975 Northern Cypriot constitutional referendum
- 1975 North Korean local elections
- 1975 North Vietnamese legislative election
- 1975 Philippine Kabataang Barangay election
- 1975 Philippine Sangguniang Bayan elections
- 1975 Republic of China legislative election
- 1975 South Korean constitutional referendum
- 1975 Thai general election

== Europe ==
- 1975 Andorran parliamentary election
- 1975 Austrian legislative election
- 1975 Czechoslovak presidential election
- 1975 Danish parliamentary election
- 1975 Finnish parliamentary election
- Germany:
  - 1975 Rhineland-Palatinate state election
  - 1975 West Berlin state election
  - 1975_Rhineland-Palatinate_state_election
  - 1975 Schleswig-Holstein state election
  - 1975 Saarland state election
  - 1975 Bremen state election
- 1975 Greek presidential election
- 1975 Hungarian parliamentary election
- 1975 Italian local elections
- 1975 Liechtenstein local elections
- 1975 Liechtenstein referendums
- 1975 Northern Cyprus constitutional referendum
- 1975 Norwegian local elections
- 1975 Portuguese Constituent Assembly election
- 1975 Romanian parliamentary election
- 1975 United Kingdom European Communities membership referendum
- 1975 Swiss federal election
- 1975 Swiss referendums
- 1975 Umbrian regional election
- 1975 Venetian regional election

== North America ==
=== Canada ===
- 1975 Alberta general election
- 1975 British Columbia general election
- 1975 New Democratic Party leadership election
- 1975 Newfoundland general election
- 1975 Northwest Territories general election
- 1975 Ontario general election
- 1975 Saskatchewan general election

=== United States ===
- 1975 New York state election
- 1975 Virginia Senate election

==== United States lieutenant gubernatorial ====
- 1975 Louisiana lieutenant gubernatorial election

==== United States gubernatorial ====
- 1975 Kentucky gubernatorial election
- 1975 Louisiana gubernatorial election
- 1975 Mississippi gubernatorial election
- 1975 United States gubernatorial elections

==== United States House of Representatives ====
- 1975 United States House of Representatives elections
- 1975 California's 37th congressional district special election
- 1975 Louisiana's 6th congressional district special election

==== United States Senate ====
- 1975 United States Senate elections
- 1975 United States Senate special election in New Hampshire

==== United States mayoral elections ====
- 1975 Baltimore mayoral election
- 1975 Boston mayoral election
- 1975 Chicago mayoral election
- 1975 Cleveland mayoral election
- 1975 Columbus, Ohio mayoral election
- 1975 Evansville mayoral election
- 1975 Indianapolis mayoral election
- 1975 Manchester, New Hampshire, mayoral election
- 1975 Miami mayoral election
- 1975 Philadelphia mayoral election
- 1975 San Diego mayoral election
- 1975 San Francisco mayoral election
- 1975 Springfield, Massachusetts, mayoral election
- 1975 Tampa mayoral election

== Oceania ==
- 1975 New Zealand general election
- 1975 Niuean general election

=== Australia ===
- 1975 Australian federal election
- 1975 Bass by-election
- 1975 Greenough state by-election
- 1975 Lane Cove state by-election
- 1975 Pittwater state by-election
- 1975 South Australian state election
- 1975 Wagga Wagga state by-election
- 1975 Western Australian daylight saving referendum
