= 1979 Tampa mayoral election =

- September 4, 1979
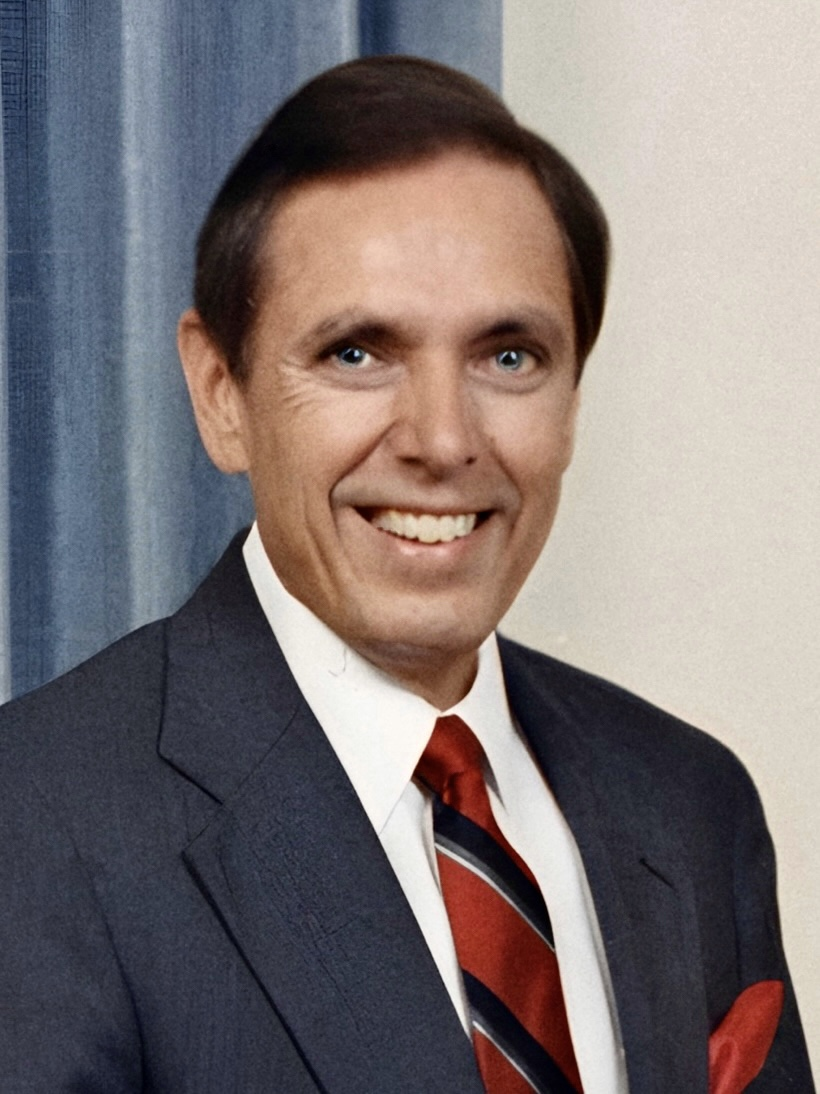

Candidate	Bob Martinez	Bob Bondi	Charles Miranda
Party	Nonpartisan	Nonpartisan	Nonpartisan
Popular vote	25,777	11,985	3,329
Percentage	57.53%	26.75%	7.43%
Mayor before election
Bill Poe
Nonpartisan
Elected mayor
Bob Martinez
Nonpartisan

The 1979 Tampa mayoral election was held on September 4, 1979. Incumbent Mayor Bill Poe declined to seek re-election. County Commissioner Bob Bondi; Bob Martinez, a 1974 candidate for mayor; and City Councilmember Charles Miranda announced that they would run to succeed Poe. Martinez ended up winning the election by a wide margin, receiving 58 percent of the vote to Bondi's 27 percent and Miranda's 7 percent, avoiding the need for a runoff election.

== Candidates ==
- Bob Martinez, restaurateur, former Executive Director of the Hillsborough Classroom Teachers Association, 1974 candidate for mayor
- Bob Bondi, former Hillsborough County Commissioner
- Charles Miranda, City Councilmember
- Steve Divona, electrical contractor
- Cy Warner, restaurateur

== Results ==
1979 Tampa mayoral election
Party	Candidate	Votes	%
Nonpartisan	Bob Martinez	25,777	57.53%
Nonpartisan	Bob Bondi	11,985	26.75%
Nonpartisan	Charles Miranda	3,329	7.43%
Nonpartisan	Steve Divona	1,895	4.23%
Nonpartisan	Cy Warner	1,820	4.06%
Total votes		44,806	100.00%
