= Mac Stipanovich =

American lobbyist

- Born: John McKager Stipanovich; November 26, 1948 (age 77); Ocala, Florida, U.S.
- Education: University of Florida (BA, JD)
- Known for: Florida election recount (2000)
- Political party: Republican (Before 2019); Independent (2019–present)

John McKager "Mac" Stipanovich (born November 26, 1948) is an American lobbyist, political strategist, and activist, best known for his role in the 2000 United States presidential election recount in Florida, in which he helped advise then-Secretary of State of Florida, Katherine Harris.

== Early life and education ==
Stipanovich was born in Ocala, Florida. He earned a Bachelor of Arts degree from the University of Florida in 1972, followed by a Juris Doctor from the Fredric G. Levin College of Law in 1974.

== Career ==
Stipanovich worked on Bob Martinez's successful 1979 Tampa mayoral campaign.

Stipanovich served as chief of staff to Martinez from 1987 to 1991, during which time Martinez was governor of Florida. After that, he served on Jeb Bush's gubernatorial campaign against Lawton Chiles during the 1994 Florida gubernatorial election.

During the 2000 United States presidential election recount in Florida, Stipanovich helped advise the Secretary of State of Florida, Katherine Harris. Stipanovich is portrayed in the HBO film Recount by Bruce McGill. The film, which had a broadcast premiere on May 25, 2008, chronicled the events in Florida during the presidential election lawsuits and appeals.

Stipanovich has written op-ed columns for The New York Times, Tampa Bay Times, Sun-Sentinel, and others. Since the 2016 United States presidential election, Stipanovich has been critical of President Donald Trump and the Republican Party, calling the latter "...isolationist, protectionist, nativist, and xenophobic." In 2019, Stipanovich registered as a Democrat, stating that he was supportive of 2020 candidates Joe Biden, Pete Buttigieg, and Amy Klobuchar. In a February 2020 op-ed for the Tampa Bay Times, Stipanovich stated that he would be "voting in the Democratic primary for the first time in 40 years." In March 2020, Stipanovich officially endorsed Joe Biden.
