= 1975 Tampa mayoral election =

- September 2, 1975

Candidate	Bill Poe	Joe Kotvas
Party	Nonpartisan	Nonpartisan
Popular vote	30,281	19,081
Percentage	61.34%	38.66%
Mayor before election
Bill Poe
Nonpartisan
Elected mayor
Bill Poe
Nonpartisan

The 1975 Tampa mayoral election was held on September 2, 1975. Incumbent Mayor Bill Poe, who was first elected in a 1974 special election, ran for re-election to a full term. He was challenged by his opponent from the 1974 election, former City Councilmember Joe Kotvas. While Poe only narrowly defeated Kotvas in 1974, he won the rematch in a landslide, receiving 61 percent of the vote to Kotvas's 39 percent.

== Candidates ==
- Joe Kotvas, former city councilmember, 1974 candidate for mayor
- Bill Poe, incumbent mayor

== Results ==
1975 Tampa mayoral election
Party	Candidate	Votes	%
Nonpartisan	Bill Poe (inc.)	30,281	61.34%
Nonpartisan	Joe Kotvas	19,081	38.66%
Total votes		49,362	100.00%
