= Cities of the Philippines =

Administrative division of the Philippines

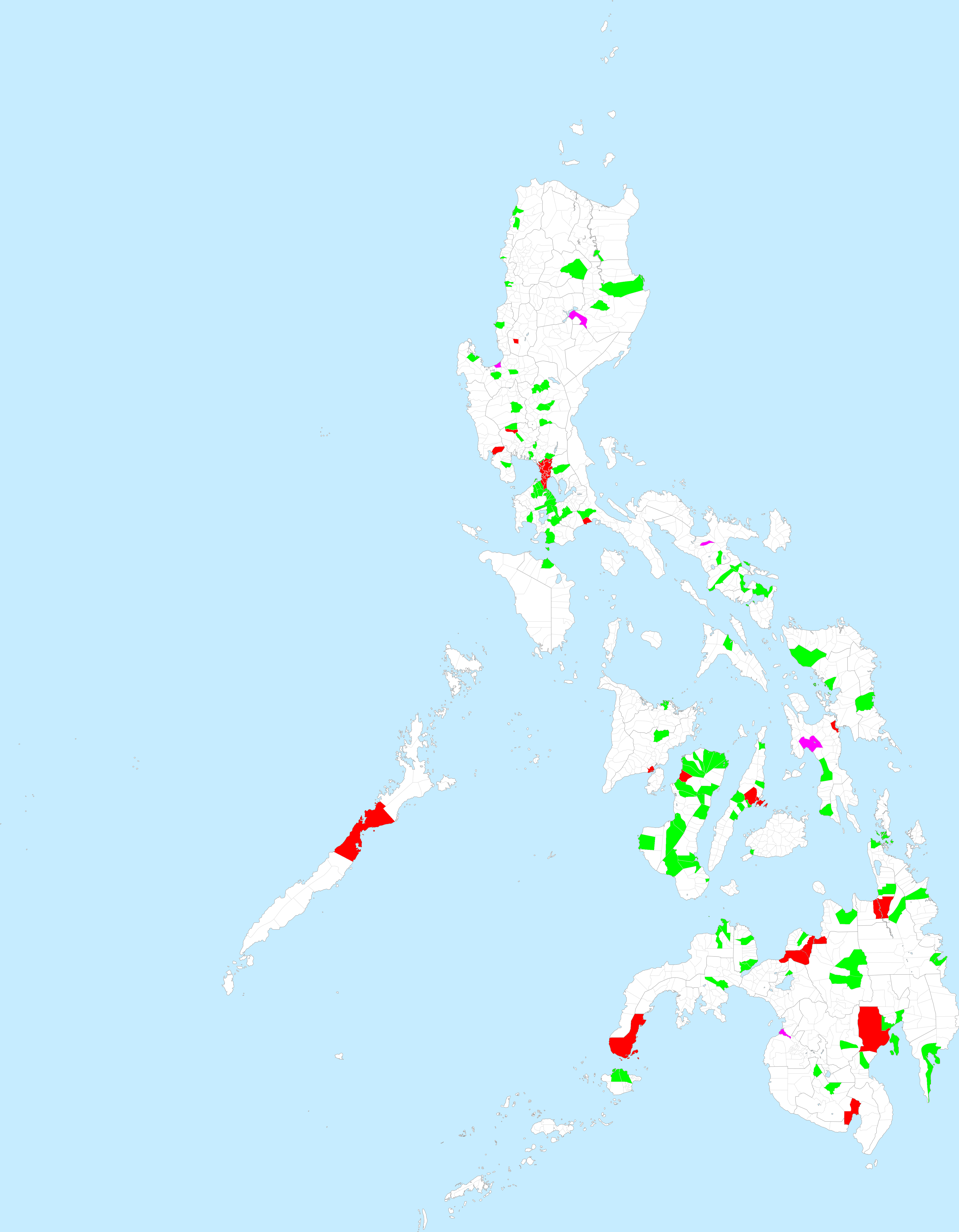
- Highly urbanized cities; Independent component cities; Component cities; Municipalities
- Category: City (Local government unit)
- Location: Philippines
- Number: 149 (as of 2023)
- Possible status: Highly urbanized city; Independent component city; Component city
- Populations: 47,883 (Palayan) – 3,084,270 (Quezon City)
- Areas: 5.95 km^{2} (2.30 sq mi) for San Juan – 2,443.61 km^{2} (943.48 sq mi) for Davao City
- Subdivisions: Barangays

A city (Filipino: lungsod) is one of the units of local government in the Philippines. All Philippine cities are chartered cities (nakakartang lungsod), whose existence as corporate and administrative entities is governed by their own specific municipal charters, in addition to the Local Government Code of 1991, which defines their administrative structure and powers. As of July 8, 2023, there are 149 cities in the country.

A city is entitled to at least one representative in the House of Representatives once its population reaches 250,000. Cities are also allowed to have a common seal. As corporate entities, they have the power to acquire, hold, lease, convey, and dispose of real and personal property for their general interests; condemn private property for public use (eminent domain); enter into contracts; sue and be sued; and exercise all other powers conferred on them by Congress. Only an act of Congress can create or amend a city charter, and through this charter, Congress may grant a city certain powers not available to regular municipalities—or even to other cities.

Despite differences in the powers accorded to each city, all cities, regardless of status, receive a larger share of the Internal Revenue Allotment (IRA) than regular municipalities, (Note: The collective share of all cities in the IRA is 23%, while that of all municipalities is 34%. Since there are far fewer cities than municipalities, an individual city receives more IRA per unit than a municipality after distribution.) and are generally more autonomous than municipalities.

== Government ==
A city's local government is headed by a mayor elected by popular vote. The vice mayor serves as the presiding officer of the Sangguniang Panlungsod (city council), which serves as the city's legislative body. Upon receiving their charters, cities also receive a full complement of executive departments to better serve their constituents. Some departments are established on a case-by-case basis, depending on the needs of the city.

Offices and officials common to all cities
Office	Head	Mandatory / Optional
City Government	Mayor	Mandatory
Sangguniang Panlungsod (City Council)	Vice Mayor as presiding officer	Mandatory
Office of the Secretary to the Sanggunian	Secretary to the Sanggunian	Mandatory
Treasury Office	Treasurer	Mandatory
Assessor's Office	Assessor	Mandatory
Accounting and Internal Audit Services	Accountant	Mandatory
Budget Office	Budget Officer	Mandatory
Planning and Development Office	Planning and Development Coordinator	Mandatory
Engineering Office	Engineer	Mandatory
Health Office	Health Officer	Mandatory
Office of Civil Registry	Civil Registrar	Mandatory
Office of the Administrator	Administrator	Mandatory
Office of Legal Services	Legal Officer	Mandatory
Office on Social Welfare and Development Services	Social Welfare and Development Officer	Mandatory
Office on General Services	General Services Officer	Mandatory
Office for Veterinary Services	Veterinarian	Mandatory
Office on Architectural Planning and Design	Architect	Optional
Office on Public Information	Information Officer	Optional
Office for the Development of Cooperatives	Cooperative Officer	Optional
Office on Population Development	Population Officer	Optional
Office on Environment and Natural Resources	Environment and Natural Resources Office	Optional
Office of Agricultural Services	Agriculturist	Optional

== Subdivisions ==
Cities, like municipalities, are composed of barangays, which can range from urban neighborhoods (e.g., Barangay Socorro in Quezon City and Barangay Pinagsama in Taguig) to rural communities (e.g., Barangay Iwahig in Puerto Princesa and Barangay Linao Norte in Tuguegarao). Barangays are sometimes grouped into officially defined administrative or geographical districts. Examples of such are the cities of Manila (16 districts), Davao (11 districts), Iloilo (seven districts), and Samal (three districts: Babak, Kaputian, and Peñaplata). Some cities such as Caloocan, Manila, and Pasay also have an intermediate level between the district and barangay levels, called a zone. However, geographic districts and zones are not political units; there are no elected city government officials at these administrative levels. Rather, they serve only to facilitate city planning, statistics-gathering, and other administrative functions.

== Classification ==
=== Income classification ===
Republic Act No. 11964, or the Automatic Income Classification of Local Government Units Act, was signed by President Bongbong Marcos on October 26, 2023. The law classifies cities into five classes according to their income ranges, based on the average annual regular income for three fiscal years preceding a general income reclassification. The classification are as follows:

Class	Average annual income (₱)
First	>1,300,000,000
Second	1,000,000,000–1,300,000,000
Third	800,000,000–1,000,000,000
Fourth	500,000,000–800,000,000
Fifth	<500,000,000

=== Legal classification ===
The Local Government Code of 1991 (Republic Act No. 7160) classifies all cities into one of three legal categories:

- Highly urbanized cities (HUC): Cities with a minimum population of 200,000, as certified by the Philippine Statistics Authority, and with the latest annual income of at least ₱50,000,000 or USD 1,000,000 based on 1991 constant prices, as certified by the city treasurer. However, San Juan in Metro Manila became a highly urbanized city in 2007 through Republic Act 9388 despite having a population of 126,347 people. A majority of the votes cast in a plebiscite held on July 21, 2007, approved the conversion.

There are currently 34 highly urbanized cities in the Philippines, 16 of which are located in Metro Manila. One other city, Pagadian, have been declared HUC by the president but have not yet been ratified through plebiscites.

- Independent component cities (ICC): Cities of this type have charters that explicitly prohibit their residents from voting for provincial officials. All four of them are considered independent from the province in which they are geographically located: Cotabato, Dagupan, Ormoc, and Santiago.
- Component cities (CC): Cities which do not meet the preceding requirements are deemed part of the province in which they are geographically located. If a component city is located along the boundaries of two or more provinces, it is considered part of the province of which it used to be a municipality.

=== Independent cities ===
There are 38 independent cities in the Philippines, all of which are classified as either "Highly urbanized" or "Independent component" cities. A city classified as such:

- does not have its Sangguniang Panlungsod legislation subject to review by any province's Sangguniang Panlalawigan;
- does not share tax revenue with any province; and
- is directly supervised by the President of the Philippines through the city government (given that the provincial government no longer exercises supervision over city officials), as stated in Section 29 of the Local Government Code.

Currently, there are only four independent cities in two classes that can still participate in the election of provincial officials (governor, vice governor, and Sangguniang Panlalawigan members):

- Cities declared highly urbanized between 1987 and 1992, whose charters (as amended) explicitly permitted residents to both vote and run for elective positions in the provincial government, and therefore allowed by Section 452-c of the Local Government Code to maintain these rights: Lucena (Quezon), Mandaue (Cebu);
- Independent component cities whose charters (as amended) only explicitly allow residents to run for provincial offices: Dagupan (Pangasinan)

Registered voters of the cities of Cotabato, Ormoc, Santiago, as well as all other highly urbanized cities, including those to be converted or created in the future, cannot participate in provincial elections.

In addition to the eligibility of some independent cities to vote in provincial elections, a few other situations become sources of confusion regarding the complete autonomy of independent cities from provinces:

- Some independent cities still serve as the seat of government for the province in which they are geographically located: Bacolod (Negros Occidental), Cagayan de Oro (Misamis Oriental), Cebu City (Cebu), Iloilo City (Iloilo), Lucena (Quezon), Puerto Princesa (Palawan) and Tacloban (Leyte). In such cases, the provincial government, apart from already financing the maintenance of its properties such as provincial government buildings and offices, may also provide the government of the independent city with an annual budget (determined by the province at its discretion) to aid in relieving incidental costs incurred by the city such as road maintenance due to increased vehicular traffic in the vicinity of the provincial government complex. The independent city of Butuan was the capital and seat of government in the province of Agusan del Norte until Cabadbaran became the province's capital since 2000.
- Some independent cities are still grouped with their former provinces for the purposes of representation in Congress. While several independent cities have their own representative(s) in Congress, some remain part of the congressional representation of the province to which they formerly belonged. Puerto Princesa, for example, is still part of the Palawan's 3rd congressional district. In cases like this, independent cities that do not vote for provincial officials are excluded from Sangguniang Panlalawigan (provincial council) districts, and the allotment of SP members is adjusted accordingly by the Commission on Elections (COMELEC) with proper consideration of population. On the other hand, the city of Lucena, which is eligible to vote for provincial officials, still forms part of the province of Quezon's 2nd Sangguniang Panlalawigan district, which is coterminous with the 2nd congressional district of Quezon.
- General lack of distinction for independent cities, for practical purposes: Many government agencies, as well as Philippine society in general, still continue to classify many independent cities outside Metro Manila as part of provinces due to historical and cultural ties, especially if these cities were once or currently socio-economic and cultural capitals of the provinces to which they once belonged. Furthermore, most maps of the Philippines showing provincial boundaries almost never separate independent cities from the provinces in which they are geographically located, for cartographic convenience. Despite being first-level administrative divisions (i.e., on the same level as provinces, as stated in Section 25 of the LGC), independent cities are still treated by many to be on the same level as municipalities and component cities (second-level administrative divisions) for educational convenience and simplicity.

A component city, while enjoying relative autonomy on some matters compared to a regular municipality, is still considered part of a province. However, there are several sources of confusion:

- Some component cities form their own congressional representation, separate from their province. The representation of a city in the House of Representatives (or lack thereof) is not a criterion for independence from a province, as Congress is the national legislative body and is part of the national (central) government. Despite Antipolo, Biñan and San Jose del Monte having their own representatives in Congress, they are still component cities of Rizal, Laguna, and Bulacan, respectively, as their respective charters specifically converted them into component cities and have no provision stating a severance in relations with their respective provincial governments.
- Being part of an administrative region different from the province: Isabela City functions as a component city of Basilan: its tax revenues are shared with the provincial government, its residents are eligible to both vote and run for provincial offices, and it is served by the provincial government and the Sangguniang Panlalawigan of Basilan with regard to provincially devolved services. However, by opting out of joining the Bangsamoro Autonomous Region in Muslim Mindanao (BARMM), Isabela City's residents are ineligible to vote and run for regional offices of the Bangsamoro Parliament, unlike the rest of Basilan. Regional services provided to Isabela City come from offices in Region IX based in Pagadian; the rest of Basilan is serviced by the BARMM based in Cotabato City. Isabela City, while not independent from its province, is this outside the jurisdiction of the BARMM, the region to which the rest of Basilan belongs. Regions are not the primary subnational administrative divisions of the Philippines, but rather the provinces.

== Creation of cities ==
Congress is the lone legislative entity that can incorporate cities. Provincial and municipal councils can pass resolutions indicating a desire to have a certain area (usually an already-existing municipality or a cluster of barangays) declared a city after the requirements for becoming a city are met. As per Republic Act No. 9009, these requirements include:

- locally generated income of at least ₱100 million (based on constant prices in the year 2000) for the last two consecutive years, as certified by the Department of Finance, and
- a population of at least 150,000, as certified by the Philippine Statistics Authority (PSA), or a contiguous territory of 100 square kilometers, as certified by the Land Management Bureau, with contiguity not being a requisite for areas that are on two or more islands.

Republic Act No. 11683 further amended Section 450 of the Local Government Code in 2022, exempting a municipality qualified for cityhood from the land or population threshold if the municipality has a locally generated average annual income of 400 million pesos for the previous 2 years according to 2012 constant prices, though this amount "shall be increased by five percent" for every three years after the law's effectivity.

Members of Congress (usually the involving representative of the congressional district to which the proposed city belongs) then draft the legislation that will convert or create the city. After the bill passes through both the House of Representatives and the Senate and becomes an Act of Congress, the President signs the Act into law. If the Act goes unsigned after 30 days it still becomes law despite the absence of the President's signature.

The creation of cities before 1983 was solely at the discretion of the national legislature; there were no requirements for achieving 'city' status other than an approved city charter. No income, population or land area requirements had to be met to incorporate cities before Batas Pambansa Bilang 337 (Local Government Code of 1983) became law. This is what made it possible for several current cities such as Tangub or Canlaon to be conferred such a status despite their small population and locally generated income, which do not meet current standards. The relatively low income standard between 1992 and 2001 (which was ₱20 million) also allowed several municipalities, such as Sipalay and Muñoz, to become cities despite not being able to meet the current ₱100 million local income standard.

Before 1987, many cities were created without any plebiscites conducted for the residents to ratify the city charter, most notable of which were cities that were incorporated during the early American colonial period (Manila and Baguio), and during the Commonwealth Era (1935–1946) such as Cavite City, Dansalan (now Marawi), Iloilo City, Bacolod, San Pablo and Zamboanga City. Only since 1987 has it been mandated under the Constitution that any change to the legal status of any local government unit requires the ratification by the residents that would be affected by such changes. Therefore, all cities created after 1987 – after meeting the requirements for cityhood as laid out in the Local Government Code of 1991 and Republic Act No. 9009 of 2001 – only acquired their corporate status after the majority of their voting residents approved their respective charters.

=== Motivations for cityhood ===
Although some early cities were given charters because of their advantageous (Baguio, Tagaytay) or strategic (Angeles City and Olongapo, Cotabato, Zamboanga) locations or to especially establish new government centers in otherwise sparsely populated areas (Palayan, Trece Martires, Quezon City), most Philippine cities were originally incorporated to provide a form of localized civil government to an area that is primarily urban, which, due to its compact nature and different demography and local economy, cannot be necessarily handled more efficiently by more rural-oriented provincial and municipal governments. However, not all cities are purely areas of dense urban settlement. To date there are still cities with huge expanses of rural or wilderness areas and considerable non-urban populations, such as Calbayog, Davao, Puerto Princesa and Zamboanga as they were deliberately incorporated with increased future resource needs and urban expansion, as well as strategic considerations, in mind.

With the enactment of the 1991 Local Government Code, municipalities and cities have both become more empowered to deal with local issues. Regular municipalities now share many of the same powers and responsibilities as chartered cities, but its citizens and/or leaders may feel that it might be to their best interest to get a larger share of internal revenue allotment (IRA) and acquire additional powers by becoming a city, especially if the population has greatly increased and local economy has become more robust. On the other hand, due to the higher property taxes that would be imposed after cityhood, many citizens have become wary of their town's conversion into a city, even if the municipality had already achieved a high degree of urbanization and has an annual income that already exceeds that of many existing lower-income cities. This has been among the cases made against the cityhood bids of many high-income and populous municipalities surrounding Metro Manila, most notably Bacoor and Dasmariñas (which finally became cities in June 2012 and November 2009 respectively), which for many years have been more qualified to become cities than others.

In response to the rapid increase in the number of municipalities being converted into cities since the enactment of the Local Government Code in 1991, Senator Aquilino Pimentel authored what became Republic Act No. 9009 in June 2001 which sought to establish a more appropriate benchmark by which municipalities that wished to become cities were to be measured. The income requirement was increased sharply from ₱20 million to ₱100 million in a bid to curb the spate of conversions into cities of municipalities that were perceived to have not become urbanized or economically developed enough to be able to properly function as a city.

Despite the passage of RA 9009, 16 municipalities not meeting the required locally generated income were converted into cities in 2007 by seeking exemption from the income requirement. This led to vocal opposition from the League of Cities of the Philippines against the cityhood of these municipalities, with the League arguing that by letting these municipalities become cities, Congress will set "a dangerous precedent" that would not prevent others from seeking the same "special treatment". More importantly, the LCP argued that with the recent surge in the conversion of towns that did not meet the requirements set by RA 9009 for becoming cities, the allocation received by existing cities would only drastically decrease because more cities will have to share the amount allotted by the national government, which is equal to 23% of the IRA, which in turn is 40% of all the revenues collected by the Bureau of Internal Revenue. The resulting legal battles resulted in the nullification of the city charters of the 16 municipalities by the Supreme Court in August 2010. (See #"League of 16" and legal battles)

== Changing city status ==
Throughout the years there have been instances of changes to the city's status with regard to eligibility for provincial elections, as a result of the passage of laws, both of general effectivity and specific to a city.

=== Before 1979 ===
Prior to 1979, all cities were just considered chartered cities, without any official category differentiating them aside from income levels. Though chartered cities were considered autonomous from the provinces from which they were created, the eligibility of their residents to vote for provincial officials was determined by their respective charters.

Regarding participation in provincial affairs, there were three types of city charters:

1. those which explicitly allowed their respective residents to elect provincial officials,
2. those which explicitly prohibited participation in provincial elections,
3. and those which are silent regarding voter participation in provincial elections.

The 1951 Supreme Court decision on Teves, et al. v. Commission on Elections finally resolved the ambiguity surrounding the third category of cities, by confirming that the residents of cities with such charters (such as Dumaguete and Davao City) are ineligible to participate in provincial elections.

Altering the right of city residents to participate in provincial elections was a power solely determined by the national legislature. Before 1979, this power was exercised in seven cases, affecting a total of six cities:

- Five Acts of the National Assembly or Congress in which the residents of an existing city were restored the right to vote for officials of the mother province:
  - August 22, 1940: Section 7 of the revised charter of the city of Iloilo (Commonwealth Act No. 158) was amended in 1940 by Commonwealth Act No. 604 to explicitly state: "The voters of said City of Iloilo shall take part in the election of the provincial officers of Iloilo, but the latter shall have no jurisdiction over the City of Iloilo and the officers thereof."
  - June 10, 1950: The original city charter of Dagupan (Republic Act No. 170) was originally silent on the matter of the eligibility of city residents to participate in provincial election, therefore implying that residents were ineligible to participate in provincial elections. Three years later Republic Act No. 448 amended the charter to explicitly empower the city's voters to participate in the election of the governor and provincial board members of Pangasinan.
  - June 14, 1956: The city of Cabanatuan was originally explicitly excluded from electing and being elected into positions in the provincial government of Nueva Ecija until its original city charter (Republic Act No. 526) was amended by Republic Act No. 1445 in 1956, which enabled the city's residents to once more vote for provincial officials.
  - June 16, 1956: The original city charter of Dansalan (Commonwealth Act No. 592) was originally silent on the matter of the eligibility of city residents to participate in provincial election, therefore implying that residents were ineligible to participate in provincial elections. Sixteen years later Republic Act No. 1552, in addition to renaming the city to Marawi, also amended the city charter to explicitly empower the city's voters to participate in the election of Lanao Province officials.
  - June 10, 1964: Cebu City's old charter (Commonwealth Act No. 58) was repealed, and replaced with Republic Act No. 3857 in 1964. The law allowed the city's residents to once more become eligible to vote for officials in the provincial government of Cebu.
  - June 21, 1969: Following the Supreme Court decision on Teves, et al. v. Commission on Elections which upheld Dumaguete's independence from Negros Oriental, Republic Act No. 5797 was enacted on June 21, 1969, by Congress to revise the city's original charter (Republic Act No. 327) to explicitly allow the city's residents to once again vote for provincial officials.
- One Act of Congress in which the residents of existing cities whose residents were previously explicitly granted the right to participate in provincial elections were deprived such a right:
  - June 19, 1959: By virtue of Section 2 of Republic Act No. 2259, the voters of the cities of Dagupan and Iloilo were deprived of the right to participate in provincial elections.

=== 1979–1983 ===
Batas Pambansa Bilang 51, approved on December 22, 1979, introduced two legal categories of cities: highly urbanized cities (HUCs) and component cities. COMELEC Resolution No. 1421, which was issued to implement the provisions of BP 51 prior to the January 30, 1980, local elections, stated that a total of 20 cities were not allowed to participate in the election of provincial officials: seven of these were "highly urbanized", while the remaining 13 were "component" cities.

- When Batas Pambansa Bilang 51 came into effect for the January 30, 1980, elections, all cities whose incomes at the time were ₱40 million or higher were considered highly urbanized cities. Cities that met this income requirement at the time were: Caloocan, Cebu, Davao, Manila, Pasay and Quezon City. Regardless of whether their respective charters allowed them to vote for provincial officials or not, highly urbanized cities were no longer allowed to vote for provincial officials. Among the aforementioned, only the voters of Cebu City lost the right to participate in provincial elections in this manner; the voters of the other five cities have not participated in any provincial election since their respective incorporation as cities. In addition, Section 3 of BP 51 also made Baguio a highly urbanized city irrespective of its income, due to its importance as the host to the official summer residences of the President and the Supreme Court. A Supreme Court case decided two days before election day upheld the legality of BP 51 in depriving the voters of Cebu City the power to elect officials for the province of Cebu.
- Per Section 3 of BP 51, all other cities were considered "component cities" of the provinces in which they are geographically located, or the provinces of which they were originally a part. Despite considering all other cities as part of their respective provinces, under BP 51 the eligibility of voters to participate in provincial elections were still determined by their cities' respective charters (as amended). The voters of a total of thirteen "component cities" continued to be ineligible to vote for provincial officials for the local elections of 1980. Nine of these were cities with charters (as amended) that expressly prohibited participation in provincial elections: Dagupan, General Santos, Iloilo, Mandaue, Naga, Ormoc, Oroquieta, San Carlos (Pangasinan) and Zamboanga. The remaining four — Bais, Canlaon, Cotabato and Ozamiz — were cities whose charters were silent on participation in provincial elections; BP 51 upheld the 1951 Supreme Court decision on Teves, et al. v. Commission on Elections by barring their residents from participating in the election of provincial officials.

=== 1983–1987 ===
Batas Pambansa Bilang 337 (Local Government Code of 1983), approved on February 10, 1983, further refined the criteria by which cities can be classified as highly urbanized cities. Under BP 337 a city that had at least 150,000 inhabitants and an income of at least ₱30 million was to be declared highly urbanized by the Minister of Local Government within thirty days of the city having met the requirement. The cities of Angeles (October 13, 1986), Bacolod (September 27, 1984), Butuan (February 7, 1985), Cagayan de Oro, Iligan (both November 22, 1983), Olongapo (December 7, 1983), and Zamboanga (November 22, 1983) became HUCs in this manner. The residents in most of these cities lost their right to participate in provincial elections for the first time. The two exceptions are: Iloilo City, which had already been deprived of the right to vote for provincial officials in 1959 by virtue of Section 2 of RA 2259, and Zamboanga City, which had been autonomously governed since its creation by virtue of Section 47 of its city charter (Commonwealth Act No. 39).

By virtue of Section 30 of Batas Pambansa Bilang 881 (Omnibus Election Code of the Philippines), approved on December 3, 1985, provided that: "unless their respective charters provide otherwise, the electorate of component cities shall be entitled to vote in the election for provincial officials of the province of which it is a part." This provision therefore overrides the 1951 Supreme Court decision on Teves, et al. v. Commission on Elections by providing voters in component cities whose charters are silent on the matter of electing provincial officials the right to again participate in provincial elections. BP 881 therefore again enfranchised voters in the cities of Bais and Canlaon (Negros Oriental), and Ozamiz (Misamis Occidental). Despite the charter of the city of Cotabato being silent on the matter of electing provincial officials, the city was not legislated to be part of any of the successor provinces of the old undivided Cotabato province. Voters of the city therefore were still not eligible to vote in the provincial elections of either Maguindanao or North Cotabato and therefore remained independent from any province.

=== 1987–1991 ===
The period between ratification of the new Constitution (February 1987) and the effectivity of the Local Government Code of 1991 (January 1992) was one of transition. During this time, BP 51, BP 337 and BP 881 were still in force: the only legal classes of cities during this period were still "highly urbanized" and "component" cities.

Altering the right of city residents to participate in provincial elections was once again exercised by the newly restored Congress in this period. A total of three cities were affected: Republic Acts Nos. 6641 (in 1987), 6726 (in 1989) and 6843 (in 1990), once again allowed the residents of Mandaue, Oroquieta and San Carlos to vote for provincial officials of Cebu, Misamis Occidental and Pangasinan respectively. Since BP 51—which only considered cities as being either "highly urbanized" or "component"—was still in force at the time, the changes were not considered as switching between legal categories, but rather a simple change within the "component city" classification that did not require a plebiscite. The "independent component city" legal classification was only introduced through the Local Government Code in 1992.

Under the same criteria set in BP 337 (Local Government Code of 1983), a total of three cities became highly urbanized: General Santos (September 5, 1988), Lucena (July 1, 1991) and Mandaue (February 15, 1991). Lucena and Mandaue were special cases, in that because their re-classification into HUC status took place after the ratification of the Constitution (February 11, 1987) but before the effectivity of the Local Government Code of 1991 (January 1, 1992), their residents were allowed to continue to participate in the election of provincial officials as per their respective charters (as amended), by virtue of Section 452-c of the LGC. Residents of General Santos were already excluded from voting for provincial officials of South Cotabato since achieving cityhood in 1968; they were therefore unaffected by this exemption.

=== 1992–present ===
The Local Government Code of 1991 came into effect on January 1, 1992, and has remained in force ever since, though some amendments have been made. New requirements for creating cities, and upgrading cities to highly urbanized status, were instituted under this Act. The LGC of 1991 was also the first time the independent component city (ICC) category was introduced. These cities are those non-highly urbanized cities whose charters explicitly prohibited city residents to vote in provincial elections. They were finally made completely independent of the province from fiscal, administrative and legal standpoints.

==== Upgrading ====
- Independent municipality to highly urbanized city

The municipalities of Metro Manila, having been severed from the provinces of Bulacan and Rizal and made independent units in 1975, were converted to highly urbanized cities, beginning in 1994 with Mandaluyong. The most recent, Navotas, became an HUC in 2007. Only Pateros, which does not currently meet the population requirement of 200,000 inhabitants, remains the only independent municipality in Metro Manila.

- Component city to independent component city (CC–ICC)

All that is needed is a congressional amendment to a component city's charter, prohibiting city residents to vote for provincial officials. In the last quarter of 2021, Samar 1st district congressman Edgar Mary Sarmiento proposed to convert the city of Calbayog from being a component city into an independent component city through the virtue of House Bill No. 10483.

- Component/independent component city to highly urbanized city (CC/ICC–HUC)

Since 1992, once a city reaches a population of 200,000 persons as certified by the Philippine Statistics Authority and an income of ₱50 million (based on 1991 constant prices) as certified by the city treasurer, the city government can submit a request to the President to have their city declared as highly urbanized within 30 days. Upon the President's declaration, a plebiscite will be held within a specific timeframe to ratify this conversion. There are no limits as to the number of times a component city can attempt to become a highly urbanized city, should previous tries be unsuccessful.

- Since 1992 three component cities have been successfully converted into HUCs:
  - Puerto Princesa (2007): Proclamation No. 1264 signed on March 26, 2007, declared the capital city of Palawan an HUC. Majority of the votes cast in a plebiscite held on July 21, 2007, approved the conversion.
  - Lapu-Lapu (2007): Proclamation No. 1222 signed on January 23, 2007, declared the component city of Lapu-Lapu an HUC. Majority of the votes cast in a plebiscite held on July 21, 2007, approved the conversion.
  - Tacloban (2008): Proclamation No. 1637 signed on October 4, 2008, declared the capital city of Leyte an HUC. Majority of the votes cast in a plebiscite held on December 18, 2008, approved the conversion.
- The following component cities failed to become HUCs, for various reasons:
  - Cabanatuan (1997): Proclamation No. 969 signed on February 13, 1997, declared the former capital of the province of Nueva Ecija an HUC. Majority of the votes cast in a plebiscite held simultaneously with the barangay elections on May 12, 1997 did not approve the conversion.
  - Tarlac City (2005): Proclamation No. 940 signed on October 27, 2005, declared the capital city of the province of Tarlac an HUC. Majority of the votes cast in a plebiscite held on February 11, 2006, did not approve the conversion.
  - Antipolo (2011): Proclamation No. 124 signed on March 14, 2011, declared the capital city of the province of Rizal an HUC. On April 4, 2011, Antipolo's city mayor announced that the planned June 18, 2011, plebiscite is indefinitely postponed, effectively suspending the bid to convert the city into an HUC.
  - Cabanatuan (2012): Proclamation No. 418 signed on July 4, 2012, once again declared the former capital of the province of Nueva Ecija an HUC. The plebiscite was originally set for December 1, 2012, but, due to preparations for the upcoming 2013 national, ARMM and local elections, was rescheduled by the COMELEC for January 25, 2014. A week before the rescheduled plebiscite, the Supreme Court issued a temporary restraining order, which postponed the vote until the case brought by Nueva Ecija governor Aurelio Umali was decided. On April 22, 2014, the Supreme Court ordered the commission to include the rest of Nueva Ecija in the plebiscite, given that the province's income will be significantly affected once Cabanatuan attains autonomy as an HUC. The Commission subsequently rescheduled the expanded plebiscite for November 8, 2014. However, on October 21 it issued Minute Resolution No. 14-0732, which suspended the voting until the city government of Cabanatuan provides the ₱101 million needed to administer the expanded plebiscite.
  - San Jose del Monte (2020): Proclamation No. 1057 signed on December 4, 2020, declared the component city of the province of Bulacan an HUC. Majority of the votes cast in a plebiscite held on October 30, 2023, did not approve the conversion.

==== Downgrading ====
===== Highly urbanized city to component city =====
Reclassifying an HUC as a component city likely involves not only amending the concerned city's charter, but also the Local Government Code, as currently there is no provision in the LGC that allows this, nor are there any precedents. Some Cebu City politicians have previously indicated that they wish to bring back the city under the province's control, to bring in more votes against the Sugbuak, the proposed partition of Cebu Province.

===== Independent component city to component city =====
A congressional amendment to the city charter enabling city residents to vote for provincial officials is required, followed by a plebiscite. Santiago's status as an independent component city was briefly in question after the enactment of Republic Act No. 8528 on February 14, 1998, which sought to make it a regular component city. The Supreme Court on September 16, 1999, however ruled in favor of the city's mayor who contended that such a change in the status of the city required a plebiscite just like any other merger, division, abolition or alteration in boundaries of any political unit. And due to the lack of a plebiscite to affirm such a change, RA 8528 was therefore unconstitutional.

==== Amendments ====
On April 11, 2022, a day after it lapsed into law without the signature of the president, President Rodrigo Duterte signed Republic Act No. 11683, which amended Section 450 of the Local Government Code, making the conversion of municipalities into cities easier. The amendments state that if a municipality generates at least ₱400 million for two consecutive years, it will be exempt from the land and population requirements.

== League of Cities of the Philippines ==
The League of Cities of the Philippines (LCP) is a non-profit organization and is not a government agency and was founded in 1988. As of July 8, 2023, the league has a membership of 149 cities. The organization was formed to help coordinate efforts to improve governance and local autonomy and to tackle issues such as preserving the environment and improving public works.

== List of cities ==
As of July 8, 2023, there are 149 cities in the Philippines. Carmona in Cavite is the newest city, following the approval of its cityhood in a plebiscite held on July 8, 2023. Thirty-four of these are highly urbanized cities, four are independent component cities, and the rest are component cities of their respective provinces.

City charters are enacted through Commonwealth Acts (CAs) or Republic Acts (RAs). Many cities established before 1987 have designated dates of inauguration (when the president or a high-ranking government official participates in ceremonies marking the attainment of cityhood) or dates of organization (when the newly converted city officially begins to function as a city). These dates may be set by the president, city officials, or Congress.

Location of the 149 cities of the Philippines (as of July 2023)

A; B; C; D; E; F; G; H; I; J; K; L; M; N; O; P; Q; R; S; T; U; V; W; X; Y; Z
City	Population (2020)	Area (Note: Land area figures are taken from the Philippine Statistics Authority.)	Density (2020)	Province (Note: Highly urbanized cities (HUC) and independent component cities (ICC) are legally independent from any province, although they are often grouped with the province they belonged to prior to their cityhood. The province indicated for such cities, as grouped by the Philippine Statistics Authority, is in italics.)	Region	Legal class	Charter (Note: Some of these city charters have been replaced, revised, or amended since. The link to the text of the original city charter is given if available online.)	Date of	
								Approval (Note: Most city charters were approved after being signed by the president. However, some were approved only after they lapsed into law, i.e. becoming law without the president's signature, which is possible if 30 days after being sent to the president's office for approval the act has remained unsigned.)	Ratification (Note: Before 1987, most municipalities gained cityhood immediately after the enactment or approval of their city charters. Only few pre-1987 city charters had a set date of effectivity (such as Tagbilaran's and Dipolog's) or required a plebiscite for the city to acquire corporate existence (such as Caloocan's or Laoag's). However, since 1987 city charters require ratification through a plebiscite, with a majority of votes cast by city residents affirming the charter. If not enough information is available, a charter's date of approval is assumed to be its date of effectivity, and the date is in italics.)
Alaminos	99,397	164.26 km^{2} (63.42 sq mi)	605/km^{2} (1,567/sq mi)	Pangasinan	I	CC	RA 09025	March 5, 2001	March 28, 2001
Angeles City	462,928 (Note: Population figure for Angeles includes residents of disputed areas between its boundary with Mabalacat.)	60.27 km^{2} (23.27 sq mi)	6,985/km^{2} (18,092/sq mi)	Pampanga	III	HUC	RA 03700	June 22, 1963	January 1, 1964
Antipolo	887,399	306.10 km^{2} (118.19 sq mi)	2,899/km^{2} (7,509/sq mi)	Rizal	IV-A	CC	RA 08508	February 13, 1998	April 4, 1998
Bacolod	600,783	162.67 km^{2} (62.81 sq mi)	3,693/km^{2} (9,566/sq mi)	Negros Occidental	NIR	HUC	CA 326	June 18, 1938	October 19, 1938
Bacoor	664,625	46.17 km^{2} (17.83 sq mi)	14,395/km^{2} (37,283/sq mi)	Cavite	IV-A	CC	RA 10160	April 10, 2012	June 23, 2012
Bago	191,210	401.20 km^{2} (154.90 sq mi)	477/km^{2} (1,234/sq mi)	Negros Occidental	NIR	CC	RA 04382	June 19, 1965	February 19, 1966
Baguio	366,358	57.51 km^{2} (22.20 sq mi)	6,370/km^{2} (16,499/sq mi)	Benguet	CAR	HUC	Act 1963	September 1, 1909	September 1, 1909
Bais	84,317	319.64 km^{2} (123.41 sq mi)	264/km^{2} (683/sq mi)	Negros Oriental	NIR	CC	RA 05444	September 9, 1968	September 9, 1968
Balanga	104,173	111.63 km^{2} (43.10 sq mi)	933/km^{2} (2,417/sq mi)	Bataan	III	CC	RA 08984	December 5, 2000	December 30, 2000
Baliwag	168,470	45.05 km^{2} (17.39 sq mi)	3,740/km^{2} (9,686/sq mi)	Bulacan	III	CC	RA 11929	July 30, 2022	December 17, 2022
Batac	55,484	161.06 km^{2} (62.19 sq mi)	344/km^{2} (892/sq mi)	Ilocos Norte	I	CC	RA 09407	March 24, 2007	June 23, 2007
Batangas City	351,437	282.96 km^{2} (109.25 sq mi)	1,242/km^{2} (3,217/sq mi)	Batangas	IV-A	CC	RA 05495	June 21, 1969	June 21, 1969
Bayawan	122,747	699.08 km^{2} (269.92 sq mi)	176/km^{2} (455/sq mi)	Negros Oriental	NIR	CC	RA 08983	December 5, 2000	December 23, 2000
Baybay	111,848	459.30 km^{2} (177.34 sq mi)	244/km^{2} (631/sq mi)	Leyte	VIII	CC	RA 09389	March 15, 2007	June 16, 2007
Bayugan	109,499	688.77 km^{2} (265.94 sq mi)	159/km^{2} (412/sq mi)	Agusan del Sur	XIII	CC	RA 09405	March 23, 2007	June 20, 2007
Biñan	407,437	43.50 km^{2} (16.80 sq mi)	9,366/km^{2} (24,259/sq mi)	Laguna	IV-A	CC	RA 09740	October 30, 2009	February 2, 2010
Bislig	99,290	331.80 km^{2} (128.11 sq mi)	299/km^{2} (775/sq mi)	Surigao del Sur	XIII	CC	RA 08804	August 16, 2000	September 18, 2000
Bogo	88,867	103.52 km^{2} (39.97 sq mi)	858/km^{2} (2,223/sq mi)	Cebu	VII	CC	RA 09390	March 15, 2007	June 16, 2007
Borongan	71,961	475.00 km^{2} (183.40 sq mi)	151/km^{2} (392/sq mi)	Eastern Samar	VIII	CC	RA 09394	March 16, 2007	June 20, 2007
Butuan	372,910	816.62 km^{2} (315.30 sq mi)	457/km^{2} (1,183/sq mi)	Agusan del Norte	XIII	HUC	RA 00523	June 15, 1950	August 2, 1950
Cabadbaran	80,354	214.44 km^{2} (82.80 sq mi)	375/km^{2} (971/sq mi)	Agusan del Norte	XIII	CC	RA 09434	April 12, 2007	July 28, 2007
Cabanatuan	327,325	192.29 km^{2} (74.24 sq mi)	1,702/km^{2} (4,409/sq mi)	Nueva Ecija	III	CC	RA 00526	June 16, 1950	July 24, 1950
Cabuyao	355,330	43.40 km^{2} (16.76 sq mi)	8,187/km^{2} (21,205/sq mi)	Laguna	IV-A	CC	RA 10163	May 16, 2012	August 4, 2012
Cadiz	158,544	524.57 km^{2} (202.54 sq mi)	302/km^{2} (783/sq mi)	Negros Occidental	NIR	CC	RA 04894	June 17, 1967	July 4, 1967
Cagayan de Oro	728,402	412.80 km^{2} (159.38 sq mi)	1,765/km^{2} (4,570/sq mi)	Misamis Oriental	X	HUC	RA 00521	June 15, 1950	June 15, 1950
Calaca	87,361	114.58 km^{2} (44.24 sq mi)	762/km^{2} (1,975/sq mi)	Batangas	IV-A	CC	RA 11544	May 26, 2021	September 3, 2022
Calamba	539,671	149.50 km^{2} (57.72 sq mi)	3,610/km^{2} (9,349/sq mi)	Laguna	IV-A	CC	RA 09024	March 5, 2001	April 21, 2001
Calapan	145,786	250.06 km^{2} (96.55 sq mi)	583/km^{2} (1,510/sq mi)	Oriental Mindoro	Mimaropa	CC	RA 08475	February 2, 1998	March 21, 1998
Calbayog	186,960	880.74 km^{2} (340.06 sq mi)	212/km^{2} (550/sq mi)	Samar	VIII	CC	RA 00328	July 15, 1948	October 16, 1948
Caloocan	1,661,584	55.80 km^{2} (21.54 sq mi)	29,777/km^{2} (77,123/sq mi)	Metro Manila	NCR	HUC	RA 03278	June 17, 1961	February 16, 1962
Candon	61,432	103.28 km^{2} (39.88 sq mi)	595/km^{2} (1,541/sq mi)	Ilocos Sur	I	CC	RA 09018	March 5, 2001	March 28, 2001
Canlaon	58,822	170.93 km^{2} (66.00 sq mi)	344/km^{2} (891/sq mi)	Negros Oriental	NIR	CC	RA 03445	June 18, 1961	June 18, 1961
Carcar	136,453	116.78 km^{2} (45.09 sq mi)	1,168/km^{2} (3,026/sq mi)	Cebu	VII	CC	RA 09436	April 15, 2007	July 1, 2007
Carmona	106,256	29.68 km^{2} (11.46 sq mi)	3,580/km^{2} (9,272/sq mi)	Cavite	IV-A	CC	RA 11938	February 23, 2023	July 8, 2023
Catbalogan	106,440	274.22 km^{2} (105.88 sq mi)	388/km^{2} (1,005/sq mi)	Samar	VIII	CC	RA 09391	March 15, 2007	June 16, 2007
Cauayan	143,403	336.40 km^{2} (129.88 sq mi)	426/km^{2} (1,104/sq mi)	Isabela	II	CC	RA 09017	February 28, 2001	March 28, 2001
Cavite City	100,674	10.89 km^{2} (4.20 sq mi)	9,245/km^{2} (23,943/sq mi)	Cavite	IV-A	CC	CA 547	May 26, 1940	May 26, 1940
Cebu City	964,169	315.00 km^{2} (121.62 sq mi)	3,061/km^{2} (7,928/sq mi)	Cebu	VII	HUC	CA 058	October 20, 1936	February 4, 1937
Cotabato City	325,079	176.00 km^{2} (67.95 sq mi)	1,847/km^{2} (4,784/sq mi)	Maguindanao del Norte	BARMM	ICC	RA 02364	June 20, 1959	June 20, 1959
Dagupan	174,302	37.23 km^{2} (14.37 sq mi)	4,682/km^{2} (12,126/sq mi)	Pangasinan	I	ICC	RA 00170	June 20, 1947	June 20, 1947
Danao	156,321	107.30 km^{2} (41.43 sq mi)	1,457/km^{2} (3,773/sq mi)	Cebu	VII	CC	RA 03028	June 7, 1961	June 7, 1961
Dapitan	85,202	390.53 km^{2} (150.78 sq mi)	218/km^{2} (565/sq mi)	Zamboanga del Norte	IX	CC	RA 03811	June 22, 1963	June 22, 1963
Dasmariñas	703,141	90.13 km^{2} (34.80 sq mi)	7,801/km^{2} (20,206/sq mi)	Cavite	IV-A	CC	RA 09723	October 15, 2009	November 25, 2009
Davao City	1,776,949	2,443.61 km^{2} (943.48 sq mi)	727/km^{2} (1,883/sq mi)	Davao del Sur	XI	HUC	CA 051	October 16, 1936	March 1, 1937
Digos	188,376	287.10 km^{2} (110.85 sq mi)	656/km^{2} (1,699/sq mi)	Davao del Sur	XI	CC	RA 08798	June 15, 2000	September 8, 2000
Dipolog	138,141	241.13 km^{2} (93.10 sq mi)	573/km^{2} (1,484/sq mi)	Zamboanga del Norte	IX	CC	RA 05520	June 21, 1969	January 1, 1970
Dumaguete	134,103	33.62 km^{2} (12.98 sq mi)	3,989/km^{2} (10,331/sq mi)	Negros Oriental	NIR	CC	RA 00327	July 15, 1948	November 24, 1948
El Salvador	58,771	106.15 km^{2} (40.98 sq mi)	554/km^{2} (1,434/sq mi)	Misamis Oriental	X	CC	RA 09435	April 12, 2007	June 27, 2007
Escalante	96,159	192.76 km^{2} (74.43 sq mi)	499/km^{2} (1,292/sq mi)	Negros Occidental	NIR	CC	RA 09014	February 28, 2001	March 31, 2001
Gapan	122,968	164.44 km^{2} (63.49 sq mi)	748/km^{2} (1,937/sq mi)	Nueva Ecija	III	CC	RA 09022	March 5, 2001	August 25, 2001
General Santos	697,315	492.86 km^{2} (190.29 sq mi)	1,415/km^{2} (3,664/sq mi)	South Cotabato	XII	HUC	RA 05412	June 15, 1968	June 15, 1968
General Trias	450,583	90.01 km^{2} (34.75 sq mi)	5,006/km^{2} (12,965/sq mi)	Cavite	IV-A	CC	RA 10675	August 19, 2015	December 12, 2015
Gingoog	136,698	568.44 km^{2} (219.48 sq mi)	240/km^{2} (623/sq mi)	Misamis Oriental	X	CC	RA 02668	June 18, 1960	June 18, 1960
Guihulngan	102,656	388.56 km^{2} (150.02 sq mi)	264/km^{2} (684/sq mi)	Negros Oriental	NIR	CC	RA 09409	March 24, 2007	July 14, 2007
Himamaylan	116,240	367.04 km^{2} (141.71 sq mi)	317/km^{2} (820/sq mi)	Negros Occidental	NIR	CC	RA 09028	March 5, 2001	March 31, 2001
Ilagan	158,218	1,166.26 km^{2} (450.30 sq mi)	136/km^{2} (351/sq mi)	Isabela	II	CC	RA 10169	June 21, 2012	August 11, 2012
Iligan	363,115	813.37 km^{2} (314.04 sq mi)	446/km^{2} (1,156/sq mi)	Lanao del Norte	X	HUC	RA 00525	June 16, 1950	June 16, 1950
Iloilo City	457,626	78.34 km^{2} (30.25 sq mi)	5,842/km^{2} (15,130/sq mi)	Iloilo	VI	HUC	CA 057	October 20, 1936	August 25, 1937
Imus	496,794	53.15 km^{2} (20.52 sq mi)	9,347/km^{2} (24,209/sq mi)	Cavite	IV-A	CC	RA 10161	April 10, 2012	June 30, 2012
Iriga	114,457	137.35 km^{2} (53.03 sq mi)	833/km^{2} (2,158/sq mi)	Camarines Sur	V	CC	RA 05261	June 15, 1968	September 3, 1968
Isabela	130,379	223.73 km^{2} (86.38 sq mi)	583/km^{2} (1,509/sq mi)	Basilan	IX	CC	RA 09023	March 5, 2001	April 25, 2001
Kabankalan	200,198	697.35 km^{2} (269.25 sq mi)	287/km^{2} (744/sq mi)	Negros Occidental	NIR	CC	RA 08297	June 6, 1997	August 2, 1997
Kidapawan	160,791	358.47 km^{2} (138.41 sq mi)	449/km^{2} (1,162/sq mi)	Cotabato	XII	CC	RA 08500	February 12, 1998	March 22, 1998
Koronadal	195,398	277.00 km^{2} (106.95 sq mi)	705/km^{2} (1,827/sq mi)	South Cotabato	XII	CC	RA 08803	August 16, 2000	October 8, 2000
La Carlota	66,664	137.29 km^{2} (53.01 sq mi)	486/km^{2} (1,258/sq mi)	Negros Occidental	NIR	CC	RA 04585	June 19, 1965	January 22, 1966
Lamitan	100,150	354.45 km^{2} (136.85 sq mi)	283/km^{2} (732/sq mi)	Basilan	BARMM	CC	RA 09393	March 15, 2007	June 18, 2007
Laoag	111,651	116.08 km^{2} (44.82 sq mi)	962/km^{2} (2,491/sq mi)	Ilocos Norte	I	CC	RA 04584	June 19, 1965	January 1, 1966
Lapu-Lapu City	497,604	58.10 km^{2} (22.43 sq mi)	8,565/km^{2} (22,182/sq mi)	Cebu	VII	HUC	RA 03134	June 17, 1961	December 31, 1961
Las Piñas	606,293	32.69 km^{2} (12.62 sq mi)	18,547/km^{2} (48,036/sq mi)	Metro Manila	NCR	HUC	RA 08251	February 12, 1997	March 26, 1997
Legazpi	209,533	153.70 km^{2} (59.34 sq mi)	1,363/km^{2} (3,531/sq mi)	Albay	V	CC	RA 02234	June 12, 1959	June 12, 1959
Ligao	118,096	246.75 km^{2} (95.27 sq mi)	479/km^{2} (1,240/sq mi)	Albay	V	CC	RA 09008	February 21, 2001	March 24, 2001
Lipa	372,931	209.40 km^{2} (80.85 sq mi)	1,781/km^{2} (4,613/sq mi)	Batangas	IV-A	CC	RA 00162	June 20, 1947	June 20, 1947
Lucena	278,924	80.21 km^{2} (30.97 sq mi)	3,477/km^{2} (9,006/sq mi)	Quezon	IV-A	HUC	RA 03271	June 17, 1961	August 19, 1962
Maasin	87,446	211.71 km^{2} (81.74 sq mi)	413/km^{2} (1,070/sq mi)	Southern Leyte	VIII	CC	RA 08796	July 11, 2000	August 10, 2000
Mabalacat	293,244 (Note: Population figure for Mabalacat excludes residents of disputed areas between its boundary with Angeles City.)	83.18 km^{2} (32.12 sq mi)	3,525/km^{2} (9,131/sq mi)	Pampanga	III	CC	RA 10164	May 15, 2012	July 21, 2012
Makati	292,743 (Note: Land area and population figures for Makati exclude Post Proper Northside and Post Proper Southside, which are still administered by Makati, but ruled in court to be part of Taguig in 2003.)	21.57 km^{2} (8.33 sq mi)	29,189/km^{2} (75,600/sq mi)	Metro Manila	NCR	HUC	RA 07854	January 2, 1995	February 4, 1995
Malabon	380,522	15.71 km^{2} (6.07 sq mi)	24,222/km^{2} (62,734/sq mi)	Metro Manila	NCR	HUC	RA 09019	March 5, 2001	April 21, 2001
Malaybalay	190,712	969.19 km^{2} (374.21 sq mi)	197/km^{2} (510/sq mi)	Bukidnon	X	CC	RA 08490	February 11, 1998	March 22, 1998
Malolos	261,189	67.25 km^{2} (25.97 sq mi)	3,884/km^{2} (10,059/sq mi)	Bulacan	III	CC	RA 08754	November 4, 1999	December 18, 1999
Mandaluyong	425,758	11.26 km^{2} (4.35 sq mi)	37,812/km^{2} (97,931/sq mi)	Metro Manila	NCR	HUC	RA 07675	February 9, 1994	April 10, 1994
Mandaue	364,116	25.18 km^{2} (9.72 sq mi)	10,442/km^{2} (27,045/sq mi)	Cebu	VII	HUC	RA 05519	June 21, 1969	August 30, 1969
Manila	1,846,513	42.34 km^{2} (16.35 sq mi)	43,612/km^{2} (112,953/sq mi)	Metro Manila	NCR	HUC	Act 0183	July 31, 1901	July 31, 1901
Marawi	207,010	87.55 km^{2} (33.80 sq mi)	2,364/km^{2} (6,124/sq mi)	Lanao del Sur	BARMM	CC	CA 592	August 19, 1940	September 30, 1950
Marikina	456,159	21.52 km^{2} (8.31 sq mi)	21,197/km^{2} (54,900/sq mi)	Metro Manila	NCR	HUC	RA 08223	November 6, 1996	December 7, 1996
Masbate City	104,522	188.00 km^{2} (72.59 sq mi)	556/km^{2} (1,440/sq mi)	Masbate	V	CC	RA 08807	August 16, 2000	September 30, 2000
Mati	147,547	588.63 km^{2} (227.27 sq mi)	251/km^{2} (649/sq mi)	Davao Oriental	XI	CC	RA 09408	March 24, 2007	June 18, 2007
Meycauayan	225,673	32.10 km^{2} (12.39 sq mi)	7,030/km^{2} (18,208/sq mi)	Bulacan	III	CC	RA 09356	October 2, 2006	December 10, 2006
Muñoz	84,308	163.05 km^{2} (62.95 sq mi)	162/km^{2} (420/sq mi)	Nueva Ecija	III	CC	RA 08977	November 7, 2000	December 9, 2000
Muntinlupa	543,445	39.75 km^{2} (15.35 sq mi)	13,672/km^{2} (35,409/sq mi)	Metro Manila	NCR	HUC	RA 07926	March 1, 1995	May 8, 1995
Naga	209,170	84.48 km^{2} (32.62 sq mi)	2,476/km^{2} (6,413/sq mi)	Camarines Sur	V	HUC	RA 00305	June 18, 1948	June 18, 1948
Naga	133,184	101.97 km^{2} (39.37 sq mi)	1,306/km^{2} (3,383/sq mi)	Cebu	VII	CC	RA 09491	July 15, 2007	September 2, 2007
Navotas	247,543	8.94 km^{2} (3.45 sq mi)	27,689/km^{2} (71,715/sq mi)	Metro Manila	NCR	HUC	RA 09387	March 10, 2007	June 24, 2007
Olongapo	260,317	103.3 km^{2} (39.9 sq mi)	1,407/km^{2} (3,644/sq mi)	Zambales	III	HUC	RA 04645	June 1, 1966	June 1, 1966
Ormoc	230,998	613.60 km^{2} (236.91 sq mi)	376/km^{2} (975/sq mi)	Leyte	VIII	ICC	RA 00179	June 21, 1947	October 20, 1947
Oroquieta	72,301	237.88 km^{2} (91.85 sq mi)	304/km^{2} (787/sq mi)	Misamis Occidental	X	CC	RA 05518	June 21, 1969	January 1, 1970
Ozamiz	140,334	169.95 km^{2} (65.62 sq mi)	826/km^{2} (2,139/sq mi)	Misamis Occidental	X	CC	RA 00321	June 19, 1948	June 19, 1948
Pagadian	210,452	378.80 km^{2} (146.26 sq mi)	556/km^{2} (1,439/sq mi)	Zamboanga del Sur	IX	CC	RA 05478	June 21, 1969	June 21, 1969
Palayan	45,383	101.40 km^{2} (39.15 sq mi)	448/km^{2} (1,159/sq mi)	Nueva Ecija	III	CC	RA 04475	June 19, 1965	June 19, 1965
Panabo	209,230	251.23 km^{2} (97.00 sq mi)	231/km^{2} (597/sq mi)	Davao del Norte	XI	CC	RA 09015	February 28, 2001	March 31, 2001
Parañaque	689,992	46.57 km^{2} (17.98 sq mi)	14,816/km^{2} (38,374/sq mi)	Metro Manila	NCR	HUC	RA 08507	February 13, 1998	March 22, 1998
Pasay	440,656	13.97 km^{2} (5.39 sq mi)	31,543/km^{2} (81,696/sq mi)	Metro Manila	NCR	HUC	RA 00183	June 21, 1947	August 16, 1947
Pasig	803,159 (Note: Population figure for Pasig excludes residents in areas disputed between this city and the municipality of Cainta, Rizal.)	48.46 km^{2} (18.71 sq mi)	16,574/km^{2} (42,926/sq mi)	Metro Manila	NCR	HUC	RA 07829	December 8, 1994	January 21, 1995
Passi	88,873	251.39 km^{2} (97.06 sq mi)	354/km^{2} (916/sq mi)	Iloilo	VI	CC	RA 08469	January 30, 1998	March 14, 1998
Puerto Princesa	307,079	2,381.02 km^{2} (919.32 sq mi)	129/km^{2} (334/sq mi)	Palawan	Mimaropa	HUC	RA 05906	June 21, 1969	January 1, 1970
Quezon City	2,960,048	171.71 km^{2} (66.30 sq mi)	17,239/km^{2} (44,648/sq mi)	Metro Manila	NCR	HUC	CA 502	October 12, 1939	October 12, 1939
Roxas	179,292	95.07 km^{2} (36.71 sq mi)	1,886/km^{2} (4,884/sq mi)	Capiz	VI	CC	RA 00603	April 11, 1951	May 12, 1951
Sagay	148,894	330.34 km^{2} (127.54 sq mi)	451/km^{2} (1,167/sq mi)	Negros Occidental	NIR	CC	RA 08192	June 11, 1996	August 10, 1996
Samal	116,771	301.30 km^{2} (116.33 sq mi)	388/km^{2} (1,004/sq mi)	Davao del Norte	XI	CC	RA 08471	January 30, 1998	March 7, 1998
San Carlos	132,650	451.50 km^{2} (174.33 sq mi)	294/km^{2} (761/sq mi)	Negros Occidental	NIR	CC	RA 02643	June 18, 1960	June 18, 1960
San Carlos	205,424	169.03 km^{2} (65.26 sq mi)	1,215/km^{2} (3,148/sq mi)	Pangasinan	I	CC	RA 04487	June 19, 1965	January 1, 1966
San Fernando	125,640	102.72 km^{2} (39.66 sq mi)	1,223/km^{2} (3,168/sq mi)	La Union	I	CC	RA 08509	February 13, 1998	March 20, 1998
San Fernando	354,666	67.74 km^{2} (26.15 sq mi)	5,236/km^{2} (13,560/sq mi)	Pampanga	III	CC	RA 08990	January 26, 2001	February 3, 2001
San Jose	150,917	185.99 km^{2} (71.81 sq mi)	811/km^{2} (2,102/sq mi)	Nueva Ecija	III	CC	RA 06051	August 4, 1969	August 4, 1969
San Jose del Monte	651,813	105.53 km^{2} (40.75 sq mi)	6,177/km^{2} (15,997/sq mi)	Bulacan	III	CC	RA 08797	July 15, 2000	September 10, 2000
San Juan	126,347	5.95 km^{2} (2.30 sq mi)	21,235/km^{2} (54,998/sq mi)	Metro Manila	NCR	HUC	RA 09388	March 11, 2007	June 16, 2007
San Pablo	285,348	197.56 km^{2} (76.28 sq mi)	1,444/km^{2} (3,741/sq mi)	Laguna	IV-A	CC	CA 520	May 7, 1940	March 30, 1941
San Pedro	326,001	24.05 km^{2} (9.29 sq mi)	13,555/km^{2} (35,108/sq mi)	Laguna	IV-A	CC	RA 10420	March 27, 2013	December 28, 2013
Santa Rosa	414,812	54.84 km^{2} (21.17 sq mi)	7,564/km^{2} (19,591/sq mi)	Laguna	IV-A	CC	RA 09264	March 10, 2004	July 10, 2004
Santo Tomas	218,500	95.41 km^{2} (36.84 sq mi)	2,290/km^{2} (5,931/sq mi)	Batangas	IV-A	CC	RA 11086	October 5, 2018	September 7, 2019
Santiago	148,580	255.50 km^{2} (98.65 sq mi)	582/km^{2} (1,506/sq mi)	Isabela	II	ICC	RA 07720	May 5, 1994	July 6, 1994
Silay	130,478	214.80 km^{2} (82.93 sq mi)	607/km^{2} (1,573/sq mi)	Negros Occidental	NIR	CC	RA 01621	June 12, 1957	June 12, 1957
Sipalay	72,448	379.78 km^{2} (146.63 sq mi)	191/km^{2} (494/sq mi)	Negros Occidental	NIR	CC	RA 09027	March 5, 2001	March 31, 2001
Sorsogon City	182,237	276.11 km^{2} (106.61 sq mi)	660/km^{2} (1,709/sq mi)	Sorsogon	V	CC	RA 08806	August 16, 2000	December 16, 2000
Surigao City	171,107	245.30 km^{2} (94.71 sq mi)	698/km^{2} (1,807/sq mi)	Surigao del Norte	XIII	CC	RA 06134	August 31, 1970	August 31, 1970
Tabaco	140,961	117.14 km^{2} (45.23 sq mi)	1,203/km^{2} (3,117/sq mi)	Albay	V	CC	RA 09020	March 5, 2001	March 24, 2001
Tabuk	121,033	700.25 km^{2} (270.37 sq mi)	173/km^{2} (448/sq mi)	Kalinga	CAR	CC	RA 09404	March 23, 2007	June 23, 2007
Tacloban	251,881	201.72 km^{2} (77.88 sq mi)	1,249/km^{2} (3,234/sq mi)	Leyte	VIII	HUC	RA 00760	June 20, 1952	June 12, 1953
Tacurong	109,319	153.40 km^{2} (59.23 sq mi)	713/km^{2} (1,846/sq mi)	Sultan Kudarat	XII	CC	RA 08805	August 16, 2000	September 18, 2000
Tagaytay	85,330	65.00 km^{2} (25.10 sq mi)	1,313/km^{2} (3,400/sq mi)	Cavite	IV-A	CC	CA 338	June 21, 1938	June 21, 1938
Tagbilaran	104,976	36.50 km^{2} (14.09 sq mi)	2,876/km^{2} (7,449/sq mi)	Bohol	VII	CC	RA 04660	June 18, 1966	July 1, 1966
Taguig	1,223,595 (Note: Land area and population figures for Taguig include Post Proper Northside and Post Proper Southside, which are still administered by Makati, but ruled in court to be part of Taguig in 2023.)	47.28 km^{2} (18.25 sq mi)	18,755/km^{2} (48,574/sq mi)	Metro Manila	NCR	HUC	RA 08487	February 11, 1998	December 8, 2004
Tagum	296,202	195.80 km^{2} (75.60 sq mi)	1,513/km^{2} (3,918/sq mi)	Davao del Norte	XI	CC	RA 08472	January 30, 1998	March 7, 1998
Talisay	263,048	39.87 km^{2} (15.39 sq mi)	6,598/km^{2} (17,088/sq mi)	Cebu	VII	CC	RA 08979	November 22, 2000	December 30, 2000
Talisay	108,909	201.18 km^{2} (77.68 sq mi)	541/km^{2} (1,402/sq mi)	Negros Occidental	NIR	CC	RA 08489	February 11, 1998	February 11, 1998
Tanauan	193,936	107.16 km^{2} (41.37 sq mi)	1,810/km^{2} (4,687/sq mi)	Batangas	IV-A	CC	RA 09005	February 2, 2001	March 10, 2001
Tandag	62,669	291.73 km^{2} (112.64 sq mi)	215/km^{2} (556/sq mi)	Surigao del Sur	XIII	CC	RA 09392	March 15, 2007	June 23, 2007
Tangub	68,389	162.78 km^{2} (62.85 sq mi)	420/km^{2} (1,088/sq mi)	Misamis Occidental	X	CC	RA 05131	June 17, 1967	February 28, 1968
Tanjay	82,642	267.05 km^{2} (103.11 sq mi)	309/km^{2} (802/sq mi)	Negros Oriental	NIR	CC	RA 09026	March 5, 2001	March 31, 2001
Tarlac City	385,398	274.66 km^{2} (106.05 sq mi)	1,403/km^{2} (3,634/sq mi)	Tarlac	III	CC	RA 08593	March 12, 1998	April 19, 1998
Tayabas	112,658	230.95 km^{2} (89.17 sq mi)	488/km^{2} (1,263/sq mi)	Quezon	IV-A	CC	RA 09398	March 18, 2007	July 14, 2007
Toledo	207,314	216.28 km^{2} (83.51 sq mi)	959/km^{2} (2,483/sq mi)	Cebu	VII	CC	RA 02688	June 18, 1960	June 18, 1960
Trece Martires	210,503	39.10 km^{2} (15.10 sq mi)	5,384/km^{2} (13,944/sq mi)	Cavite	IV-A	CC	RA 00981	May 24, 1954	January 1, 1956
Tuguegarao	166,334	144.80 km^{2} (55.91 sq mi)	1,149/km^{2} (2,975/sq mi)	Cagayan	II	CC	RA 08755	November 4, 1999	December 18, 1999
Urdaneta	144,577	100.26 km^{2} (38.71 sq mi)	1,442/km^{2} (3,735/sq mi)	Pangasinan	I	CC	RA 08480	February 10, 1998	March 21, 1998
Valencia	216,546	587.29 km^{2} (226.75 sq mi)	369/km^{2} (955/sq mi)	Bukidnon	X	CC	RA 08985	December 5, 2000	December 30, 2000
Valenzuela	714,978	47.02 km^{2} (18.15 sq mi)	15,206/km^{2} (39,383/sq mi)	Metro Manila	NCR	HUC	RA 08526	February 14, 1998	December 30, 1998
Victorias	90,101	133.92 km^{2} (51.71 sq mi)	673/km^{2} (1,743/sq mi)	Negros Occidental	NIR	CC	RA 08488	February 11, 1998	March 21, 1998
Vigan	53,935	25.12 km^{2} (9.70 sq mi)	2,147/km^{2} (5,561/sq mi)	Ilocos Sur	I	CC	RA 08988	December 27, 2000	January 22, 2001
Zamboanga City	977,234	1,453.27 km^{2} (561.11 sq mi)	659/km^{2} (1,706/sq mi)	Zamboanga del Sur	IX	HUC	CA 039	October 12, 1936	February 26, 1937

=== City facts ===
- By population (2020 census figures)
  - Smallest: Palayan (45,383)
  - Largest: Quezon City (2,960,048)
- By population density (calculated using 2020 census figures):
  - Most densely populated: Manila, with 41,515 people per square kilometer
  - Most sparsely populated: Puerto Princesa, with 130 people per square kilometer
- By land area:
  - Smallest: San Juan, with an area of 5.94 square kilometres (2.29 sq mi)
  - Largest: Davao City, with an area of 2,433.61 square kilometres (939.62 sq mi). However, some sources claim that Puerto Princesa covers an area of more than 2,500 square kilometres (970 sq mi), its officially recognized land area figure (according to IRA share calculation data) is 2,381.02 square kilometres (919.32 sq mi).
- By elevation:
  - Lowest: Most Philippine cities are located on sea level. However, some parts of Navotas, South Caloocan and Malabon are below sea level, and continue to experience subsidence.
  - Highest: much of Baguio is situated more than 1,300 metres (4,300 ft) above sea level. However, the peak of Mount Apo, the tallest mountain in the Philippines, forms part of Davao City's boundary with the municipality of Bansalan, Davao del Sur; the city of Digos encompasses a section of the Mount Apo Natural Park as well.
- Most extreme points:
  - Northernmost: Laoag
  - Southernmost: General Santos
  - Easternmost: Bislig
  - Westernmost: Puerto Princesa

=== Defunct/dissolved cities ===
- Legazpi City (1948–1954): Legazpi's cityhood was approved on June 18, 1948. Under Republic Act No. 306, Legazpi became a city after the President of the Philippines proclaimed its cityhood. Comprising the present-day territories of Legazpi City and Daraga, the city was dissolved on June 8, 1954 when Legazpi and Daraga were made into separate municipalities. Legazpi eventually became a city on its own on June 12, 1959.
- Basilan City (1948–1973): Formerly part of the city of Zamboanga until it was made a city on its own in 1948 through Republic Act No. 288. Delimited to only the downtown area of what is now Isabela City upon the creation of the province of Basilan in 1973 through Presidential Decree No. 356 by President Ferdinand Marcos. Finally abolished and its territory annexed to the municipality of Isabela on November 7, 1975, through Presidential Decree No. 840.
- Rajah Buayan City (1966): Under Republic Act No. 4413, the then-municipality of General Santos in what was then the unified province of Cotabato was to be formally converted into a city named after a historical ruler in Mindanao on January 1, 1966, provided that majority of qualified voters in the municipality vote in favor of cityhood in a plebiscite. In December 1965 the Commission on Elections (COMELEC) proclaimed the cityhood of Rajah Buayan, with 4,422 people voting for and 3,066 voting against. However, two residents of the new city challenged this by arguing in the courts that the number of people who voted in favor of cityhood did not form a majority in light of the fact that there were 15,727 voters in the city. The court issued an injunction on January 4, 1966, restraining city officers from performing any acts authorized by or pursuant to provisions in RA 4413. The Supreme Court unanimously upheld this decision on October 29, 1966, and declared that the city charter was not accepted by majority of voters, thus rendering RA 4413 null and void. The municipality of General Santos would later be converted into a city under the same name in 1968.

==== "League of 16" and legal battles ====
The Supreme Court of the Philippines, by a highly divided vote of 6–5, on November 18, 2008, subsequently upheld with finality on May 6, 2009, declared unconstitutional cityhood laws converting 16 municipalities into cities. The 24-page judgment of Justice Antonio T. Carpio, adjudged that the following cityhood laws violate secs. 6 and 10, Article X of the Constitution of the Philippines:

- RA No. 9389 (Baybay, Leyte)
- RA No. 9390 (Bogo, Cebu)
- RA No. 9391 (Catbalogan, Samar)
- RA No. 9392 (Tandag, Surigao del Sur)
- RA No. 9393 (Lamitan, Basilan)
- RA No. 9394 (Borongan, Eastern Samar)
- RA No. 9398 (Tayabas, Quezon)
- RA No. 9404 (Tabuk, Kalinga)
- RA No. 9405 (Bayugan, Agusan del Sur)
- RA No. 9407 (Batac, Ilocos Norte)
- RA No. 9408 (Mati, Davao Oriental)
- RA No. 9409 (Guihulngan, Negros Oriental)
- RA No. 9434 (Cabadbaran, Agusan del Norte)
- RA No. 9435 (El Salvador, Misamis Oriental)
- RA No. 9436 (Carcar, Cebu)
- RA No. 9491 (Naga, Cebu)

The Court held that the foregoing cityhood laws, all enacted after RA 9009's effectivity, "explicitly exempt respondent municipalities from the increased income requirement from ₱20 million to ₱100 million in Section 450 of the Local Government Code (LGC), as amended by RA 9009. Such exemption clearly violates Section 10, Article X of the Constitution and is thus patently unconstitutional. To be valid, such exemption must be written in the Local Government Code and not in any other law, including the Cityhood Laws."

However, more than a year later, on December 22, 2009, acting on the appeal of the so-called League of 16 Cities (an informal group consisting of the sixteen local government units whose cityhood status had been reversed), the Supreme Court reversed its earlier ruling as it ruled that "at the end of the day, the passage of the amendatory law (regarding the criteria for cityhood as set by Congress) is no different from the enactment of a law, i.e., the cityhood laws specifically exempting a particular political subdivision from the criteria earlier mentioned. Congress, in enacting the exempting law/s, effectively decreased the already codified indicators." As such, the cityhood status of the said 16 LGUs was effectively restored.

On August 24, 2010, in a 16-page resolution, the Supreme Court reinstated its November 18, 2008, decision striking down the cityhood laws, reducing once more the sixteen LGUs to the status of regular municipalities.

The most recent development in the legal battles surrounding the League of 16 came on February 15, 2011. Voting 7–6, the Supreme Court (SC) ruled that 16 towns that became cities in 2007 can stay as cities. This was the fourth time the SC has ruled on the case, and the third reversal. It said the conversion of the 16 towns into cities met all legal requirements.

In March 2011, the League of Cities of the Philippines (LCP), while challenging a Supreme Court ruling that upheld the cityhood conversion of 16 municipalities, has expressed support for the cityhood bids of 21 towns that have fulfilled the requirements outlined in the Local Government Code. These towns have demonstrated their compliance with the eligibility criteria required for cityhood were endorsed by the LCP for cityhood conversion:

- Laguna: Cabuyao, San Pedro
- Rizal: Cainta, Taytay, Binangonan
- Cavite: Bacoor, General Trias, Imus, Carmona, Silang
- Nueva Ecija: Pantabangan
- Batangas: Calaca, Santo Tomas, Bauan, Nasugbu
- Quezon: Mauban
- Bulacan: Marilao, Santa Maria, Norzagaray
- Bataan: Limay

=== Rejected cityhood ===
This is a list of attempts that reached the stage where a Republic Act was enacted for the purpose of achieving cityhood.

- Batangas (1965): A majority of the votes cast in the then-municipality of Batangas rejected cityhood in a plebiscite conducted on the same day as the 1965 Philippine general elections, as mandated by Republic Act No. 4586. The city would have been named Laurel City in honor of Jose P. Laurel, the president of the Japanese-sponsored Second Republic. The municipality of Batangas would later be converted into a city under the same name in 1969.
- Tarlac (1969): The city charter of Tarlac (Republic Act No. 5907) was approved on June 21, 1969. Cityhood was rejected in a plebiscite held on November 11, 1969, by a majority of the ballots cast. Tarlac became a city 29 years after, in 1998.
- Taguig (1998): Republic Act No. 8487, Taguig was supposed to be converted into a highly urbanized city but it was rejected due to lower income. More than six years later, the cityhood of Taguig was ratified with majority of the ballots cast votes in a plebiscite held on December 8, 2004.
- Ilagan (1999): Republic Act No. 8474, which converted Ilagan to a component city of Isabela, was approved on February 2, 1998. However, majority of votes cast in the plebiscite held on March 14, 1999, rejected cityhood. Ilagan finally became a city after majority of votes cast in the August 11, 2012, plebiscite approved the Republic Act No. 10169.
- Novaliches (1999): On February 23, 1998, the controversial City Charter of Novaliches (Republic Act No. 8535) was approved, which sought to create a new city out of the 15 northern barangays of Quezon City. Historically a separate town, Novaliches was distributed between Quezon City and northern Caloocan in 1948. In a plebiscite held on October 23, 1999, the majority of ballots cast (which included all voters of Quezon City and not just the 15 barangays) rejected the cityhood of Novaliches.
- Meycauayan (2001): Cityhood was rejected by majority of the votes cast in a plebiscite held on March 30, 2001, to ratify Republic Act No. 9021. Meycauayan became a city five years later with the enactment of Republic Act No. 9356 and its ratification through a plebiscite on December 10, 2006.

=== Former names ===
This is a list of name changes made upon or since cityhood.

- Cagayan de Oro: The municipality of Cagayan was converted to the city of Cagayan de Oro on June 15, 1950, through Republic Act No. 521. An earlier bill was filed by Misamis Oriental Congressman Pedro S. Baculio for the creation of the City of Cagayan, however the 1st Congress was adjourned before any readings for the bill had done. The final, and enacted, cityhood bill authored by Congressman (and later Vice President) Emmanuel Pelaez gave the city its present name.
- Lapu-Lapu: The municipality of Opon was converted to a city named after Lapulapu, hero of the Battle of Mactan in 1961 through Republic Act No. 3134.
- Marawi: Inaugurated as the City of Dansalan in 1950, renamed to Marawi on June 16, 1956, through Republic Act No. 1552.
- Ozamiz: The municipality of Misamis was converted to a city named after José Ozámiz, the first governor of Misamis Occidental, in 1948 through Republic Act No. 321.
- Pasay: Inaugurated as Rizal City in 1947, reverted to Pasay on June 7, 1950, through Republic Act No. 437.
- Roxas: In 1951, the municipality of Capiz was converted to a city named after Manuel Roxas, the first president of the Third Philippine Republic and town native through Republic Act No. 603.

== Proposed cities ==
The following municipalities have pending legislative bills filed in the 20th Congress seeking their conversion into component cities:

- Bayambang, Pangasinan – through House Bill No. 3817 by Maria Rachel Arenas
- Claver, Surigao del Norte – through House Bill No. 68 by Bernadette Barbers
- Consolacion, Cebu – through House Bill No. 3886 by Daphne Lagon, and Sonny Lagon
- Ipil, Zamboanga Sibugay – through House Bill No. 173 by Marlesa Hofer-Hasim
- Isulan, Sultan Kudarat – through House Bill No. 389 by Ruth Sakaluran
- Kalibo, Aklan – through House Bill No. 4889 by Jesus R. Marquez
- La Trinidad, Benguet – through House Bill No. 1328 by Eric Yap, and Edvic Yap
- Liloan, Cebu – through House Bill No. 3305 by Vincent Franco Frasco
- Lingayen, Pangasinan – through House Bill No. 5472 by Mark O. Cojuangco
- Malay, Aklan – through House Bill No. 4415 by Florencio Miraflores, through House Bill No. 5776 by James Ang Jr., through House Bille No. 7732 by Florencio Miraflores and James Ang Jr.
- Minglanilla, Cebu – through House Bill No. 7654 by Rhea Mae Gullas
- San Jose, Occidental Mindoro – through House Bill No. 3602, House Bill No. 7634 by Leody Tarriela
- Santa Cruz, Davao del Sur – through House Bill No. 2787 by John Tracy Cagas
- Santa Maria, Bulacan – through House Bill No. 3873 by Salvador Pleyto
- Santo Tomas, Davao del Norte – through House Bill No. 9191 by Jose Manuel Lagdameo
- Sariaya, Quezon – through House Bill No. 2023 by Ma. Cristina Lopez

Capital town proposed conversion – through House Bill No. 7876 filed by Elijah San Fernando on February 18, 2026, which seeks to convert the capital town of provinces into a component city with less than fifty percent dependency on tax, amending the section 450 of Republic Act No. 7160, as previously amended by Republic Act No. 9009 and further amended by Republic Act No. 11683.

=== Pending ratification ===
==== Into a highly urbanized city ====
- Pagadian: Proclamation No. 1247

== See also ==
- Sangguniang Panlungsod
- List of cities in the Philippines
- List of metropolitan areas in the Philippines
- List of cities and municipalities in the Philippines
- List of renamed cities and municipalities in the Philippines
