= Florida statewide teachers' strike of 1968 =

- Part of Teacher strikes in the United States
- Date: February 19, 1968 – March 8, 1968
- Location: United States, Florida
- Caused by: Negotiations breakdown over amount of public education funding and teacher salaries
- Result: Union victory: Increase in public school funding budget; Strengthening of Florida teacher unions

Parties
Striking teachers; Florida Education Association	Florida government

Number
+25,700	

The Florida statewide teachers' strike of 1968 was a strike action in the US state of Florida in February and March 1968 by teachers and other education workers belonging to the Florida Education Association (FEA). The cause of the strike was under-funding of the state's educational system at a time when attendance was rising sharply, combined with low pay and benefits for teachers. The strike lasted from a few days in some school districts to three months in others. Although a special session of the Florida Legislature approved higher taxes to pay for more school funding, FEA members felt the funding hikes were not enough and voted to continue striking. No additional funding was forthcoming, however, and most local affiliates of the FEA settled their contracts and went back to work by the end of March.

The 1968 strike is considered the first statewide teacher' strike in United States history, although that claim is also made by the Utah Education Association for 1963.

== Causes of the strike ==
The primary causes of the strike were an increase in activism among Florida's teachers, leading to the transformation of the FEA into a labor union, and state underfunding of the Florida education system. According to a contemporary article in Time:

The root of the trouble goes back to [Governor] Kirk's 1966 election campaign, in which he promised to produce something of a political miracle: to hold state taxes steady and at the same time make Florida "first in the nation in education." State educators dismissed the incompatible promises as idle oratory—only to discover that Kirk was not kidding—at least about the tax lid. He vetoed $130 million worth of special appropriations for the schools voted by the 1967 legislature.

The teachers had some reason to complain that this was the wrong time to pull tight the purse strings. The average teacher salary in Florida is $6,660, which is $660 below the national norm. And while Florida is growing rapidly in population and wealth, it is actually slipping in the share of state revenue devoted to education. It ranks tenth among the states in per-capita income, but at $523 per pupil, ranks 37th in what it spends on the schools. Ten years ago the state contributed 59% of the cost of the schools; last year this had shrunk to 42%—and many counties have been hard pressed to make up the difference.

The motivations for the strike can also be traced back to the 1950's, with a group of Florida legislators known as the Pork Chop Gang. The Pork Chop Gang were more interested in a "rural-centric conservative ideology that maintained school segregation, while simultaneously disregarding districts outside of their electorate". They were criticized by both parents and politicians in the state who argued that their approach to education was detrimental to educational quality and growth. A 1965 investigative report conducted by the National Education Association (NEA) found that lack of funding as a result of Pork Chop Gang legislature control was a huge reason for frustration among educators at the time.

In the same year, Governor Hayden Burns, who held alleged ties to the Pork Chop Gang, called a legislative session focused on education, mainly with respects to funding issues. The Florida Education Association (FEA) demanded more funding, including things such as more school resources and a competitive salary schedule. The legislature dismissed the demands of the FEA, sparking a new era of teacher militancy that would later be on display during the 1968 walkout. FEA Secretary at the time, Phil Constans, cited the 1965 session of the legislature as the turning point for the FEA.

=== Rise of the Florida teacher strike (1968) ===
The Florida Education Association was established in 1886 as an affiliate of the National Education Association (NEA). It was an association rather than a labor union, and was opposed to collective bargaining and strikes.

In 1963, Pat Tornillo, a teacher in the Dade County school system, ran for the presidency of the Dade County Classroom Teachers Association (DCCTA). He won by calling for greater organizational militancy and the desegregation of teaching staff.

Tornillo's election was a sign of a wave of union-like militancy sweeping the NEA in Florida and nationally. Since its inception, the NEA had rejected collective bargaining and strikes as unprofessional. But after the American Federation of Teachers won collective bargaining rights for teachers in New York City and formed the United Federation of Teachers, many NEA members began to push for the association to act more like a union. In 1961, about 200 of the NEA's largest urban locals formed the National Council of Urban Education Associations to push the national organization toward collective bargaining. The caucus was successful: The same year, the NEA Representative Assembly (RA) passed a resolution establishing an "Urban Project", adopting a policy of "professional negotiations" akin to collective bargaining, and requiring the NEA to provide staff, research and financial assistance to locals involved in "professional negotiations".

By 1965, the NEA was providing nearly $885,000 a year to locals in support of "professional negotiations", up from a mere $28,000 in 1961. In 1962, pro-unionization forces in the NEA pushed to remove the organization's prohibition against strikes. They were unsuccessful, but did win approval of a "sanctions" policy. "Sanctions" included waging a public relations campaign against the school district, encouraging teachers to not accept teaching positions with the school system, refusing to provide unpaid services (such as tutoring or supervision of clubs), and political action to defeat anti-union politicians. "Sanctions" could be employed against any school district which, in the opinion of the local association, had engaged in "unethical or arbitrary" policies or which had refused "sound professional practices". The first time the NEA voted sanctions against an entire state was in Utah in 1963.

Tornillo eagerly embraced professional negotiations and sanctions, and in 1966 he forced the Dade County school system to open negotiations with the DCCTA. Although the national NEA was obligated to provide assistance, the FEA was not and refused to become involved in Tornillo's professional negotiations. Nevertheless, the DCCTA won a contract. But FEA's reluctance to support the local association led Tornillo and other leaders to lobby the state association to become more militant.

=== State underfunding of education ===
Florida, like many American states, strictly regulates the way in which local school districts may fund education. Property taxes are the largest source of income, and may be levied by each local school district under a formula controlled by the state legislature. However, the state of Florida also provides funds for a variety of educational programs under formulas established by in state law. These programmatic funds are often funded by the state's sales taxes and so-called sin taxes.

In 1967, Florida's schools were suffering from a large influx of students. The post-World War II baby boom, U.S. migration, and emigration into the state had caused school enrollment to rise by more than 50 percent, yet little school building or hiring of new personnel had taken place. The underfunding of Florida public schools was acknowledged by most elected leaders, but there seemed little public demand for increased school funding.

== Strike ==
=== Legislative inaction ===
1966 was an election year. Republican Claude R. Kirk, Jr. ran for governor and won, becoming the first Republican governor since 1877. Kirk had campaigned heavily on a promise to improve funding for education, but he also made a pledge not to raise taxes.

During the 1967 legislature session, the FEA lobbied the state legislature hard for more funding for public schools. State legislative action had often been the only way for NEA locals to win better pay and working conditions prior to the enactment of the professional negotiations policy, so FEA was no newcomer to politics. FEA asked for a minimum teacher salary of $5,000 a year and a more equitable means of funding schools than property taxes. The Democratic-controlled state legislature approved a higher sales tax to provide for more school funding. But Kirk vetoed the budget, and Republican legislators upheld the veto.

=== Fall 1967 spot-strikes ===
Many Florida teachers were angered by the Gov. Kirk's veto. An August 1967 rally at the Tangerine Bowl in Orlando drew between 19,000 and 30,000 teachers from all across the state. The teachers in attendance demanded a special session of the legislature to address the ongoing teachers’ crisis. At the rally, FEA Secretary Phil Constans gave the following speech:

The speaker acknowledged teachers' frustrations over classroom conditions, urged them to continue fulfilling their responsibilities to students, and argued that stronger collective action should be taken only when necessary.

By the time of the rally, both teachers and FEA leaders increasingly began to consider a strike. At the Tangerine Bowl, thousands of Florida teachers signed thousands of letters of resignation but withheld them, hoping that the threat of mass resignation would spur Governor Kirk into action.

Following the rally, Governor Kirk appeared in a televised program titled "Education in Florida: Perspective for Tomorrow”. In this program, Kirk outlined a plan for a thirty-person citizen committee whose objective was to look at the needs for education and make reform suggestions that would be heard at the following legislature. This committee overwhelmingly consisted of Florida businessmen, and the committee’s plan to simply analyze the problem and make suggestions further angered teachers, who demanded immediate action.

Spot strikes occurred throughout the state after the August rally. Even though public employee strikes are illegal in Florida, teachers in Pinellas and Broward counties struck in September. Schools in many districts closed, although no school districts were shuttered. Courts ordered the teachers back into the classroom, but hundreds of teachers still stayed out—some for several weeks.

=== February 1968 statewide strike ===
The September spot-strikes galvanized public opinion into supporting the changes the teachers demanded. Gov. Kirk called a special session of the legislature in January 1968. In a bipartisan effort, legislators raised taxes to expand state funding for school building and to pay for higher teacher salaries. Gov. Kirk signed the tax and funding package immediately. A special convention of the FEA voted to approve a resolution which condemned the increases as inadequate. In February 1968, FEA president Jane Arnold said the state association would support local teachers if they walked off the job. Thousands did. Since strikes were illegal, what actually happened were mass resignations.

Schools closed in roughly two-thirds of Florida's counties. Many individual schools closed in those districts which managed to remain open and functioning. At the height of the strike, 25,712 educators—about 40 percent of the state's teachers—walked out.

The impact of the strike was not uniform, however. Strikes lasted only a few days in some districts, while in others teachers walked picket lines for weeks. In Pinellas County, the local education association stayed out for six weeks, and some small groups of teachers struck for as long as three months.

Gov. Kirk and the legislature stood firm, however, and refused to appropriate more money or raise taxes further.

Local school districts began taking action to break the strike. Arnold and other FEA leaders were threatened with arrest. Tornillo was fined $30,000 and given a two-year jail term (which, after appeal, he was not forced to serve). School districts hired substitute teachers as strikebreakers, and local businesses paid their employees to teach classes.

Most teachers went back after only a few weeks, when it became clear that public support for the teachers, weak at the beginning of the strike, had shrunk dramatically. "'We thought they (the public) would be with us,' Arnold said. 'We thought it would unite the community and the teachers. It did a little bit of the opposite. ... A lot of teachers lost their innocence. They thought the community liked them.'" Local education associations began to negotiate their own settlements, often agreeing to not challenge school districts for terminating the most militant teachers. By the end of March, nearly all teachers were back at work, and the strike was over.

== Assessment of the strike ==
The strike was the nation's first statewide teachers' strike, keeping more than 40 percent of Florida teachers at home. Education funding rose significantly, but the organization felt that it did not rise enough to meet the needs identified by the teachers. From this perspective, the strike was not a success. However, the FEA did obtain much higher funding for education and convinced Gov. Kirk to break his no-new-taxes pledge.

The strike had a profound effect on the national NEA. Following the 1968 Florida strike, delegates to the NEA Representative Assembly (the organization's national governing body) approved a resolution which—for the first time—sanctioned teacher strikes (calling them "withdrawal of services") and denouncing state attempts to ban them. The resolution was a direct outcome of the statewide Florida strike.

A longer-term effect of the strike was to dramatically improve the outlook for teachers' unions in Florida. FEA members were radicalized by the strike and the statewide federation later won significant court and legislative victories which legalized and promoted the formation of teacher and education unions in the state. Although the 1968 strike led to the fragmentation of the FEA in 1974, education unions merged back into one organization in 2000, and as of 2006 unions were recognized in school districts covering 90 percent of the state's education workers. The FEA is now one of Florida's largest unions, and the second-largest in the Florida AFL-CIO.

== See also ==
- Hillsborough Classroom Teachers Association
