= 1974 Tampa mayoral special election =

- September 10, 1974; October 1, 1974

Candidate	Bill Poe	Joe Kotvas
First round	10,302; 21.95%	10,408; 22.18%
Runoff	24,902; 50.37%	24,534; 49.63%
Candidate	Bob Martinez	Alton M. White
First round	8,673; 18.48%	7,463; 15.90%
Runoff	Eliminated	Eliminated
Mayor before election
Richard Cheney
Nonpartisan
Elected mayor
Bill Poe
Nonpartisan

The 1974 Tampa mayoral special election was held on October 1, 1974, following a primary election on September 10, 1974. Mayor Dick A. Greco, who was elected in 1967 and 1971, resigned on March 28, 1974, to accept a position with the Edward J. DeBartolo Corporation, a shopping mall developer. Following Greco's resignation, City Council Chairman Richard Cheney began serving as acting mayor. Cheney initially planned to run in the special election, but he died on June 20, 1974. City Councilmember Lloyd Copeland became acting mayor following Cheney's death, and did not seek a full term in the election.

Seven candidates ran in the special election. City Councilmember Joe Kotvas narrowly placed first in the special election, winning 22.2 percent of the vote, and was closely followed by insurance executive Bill Poe, who won 21.9 percent. In the general election that followed, Poe barely defeated Kotvas, winning 50.4 percent to Kotvas's 49.6 percent, a margin of 368 votes. Kotvas requested a recount, which ultimately upheld Poe's victory.

== Primary election ==
=== Candidates ===
- Logan Browning, former city comptroller
- Joe Kotvas, city councilmember
- Bob Martinez, executive director of the Hillsborough Classroom Teachers Association
- Vince Meloy, city councilmember
- Bill Poe, insurance executive
- Frank Scionti, produce dealer
- Alton M. White, former director of the Metropolitan Development Agency

=== Results ===
1974 Tampa mayoral special primary election
Party	Candidate	Votes	%
Nonpartisan	Joe Kotvas	10,408	22.18%
Nonpartisan	Bill Poe	10,302	21.95%
Nonpartisan	Bob Martinez	8,673	18.48%
Nonpartisan	Alton M. White	7,463	15.90%
Nonpartisan	Logan Browning	5,265	11.22%
Nonpartisan	Vince Meloy	4,460	9.50%
Nonpartisan	Frank Scionti	362	0.77%
Total votes		46,933	100.00%

== General election ==
=== Results ===
1974 Tampa mayoral special general election
Party	Candidate	Votes	%
Nonpartisan	Bill Poe	24,902	50.37%
Nonpartisan	Joe Kotvas	24,534	49.63%
Total votes		49,436	100.00%
