= 1980 Philippine local elections =

1980 Philippine local election
← 1975	January 30, 1980	1988 →

All 69 Gubernatorial seats and all 1,554 Mayoral seats
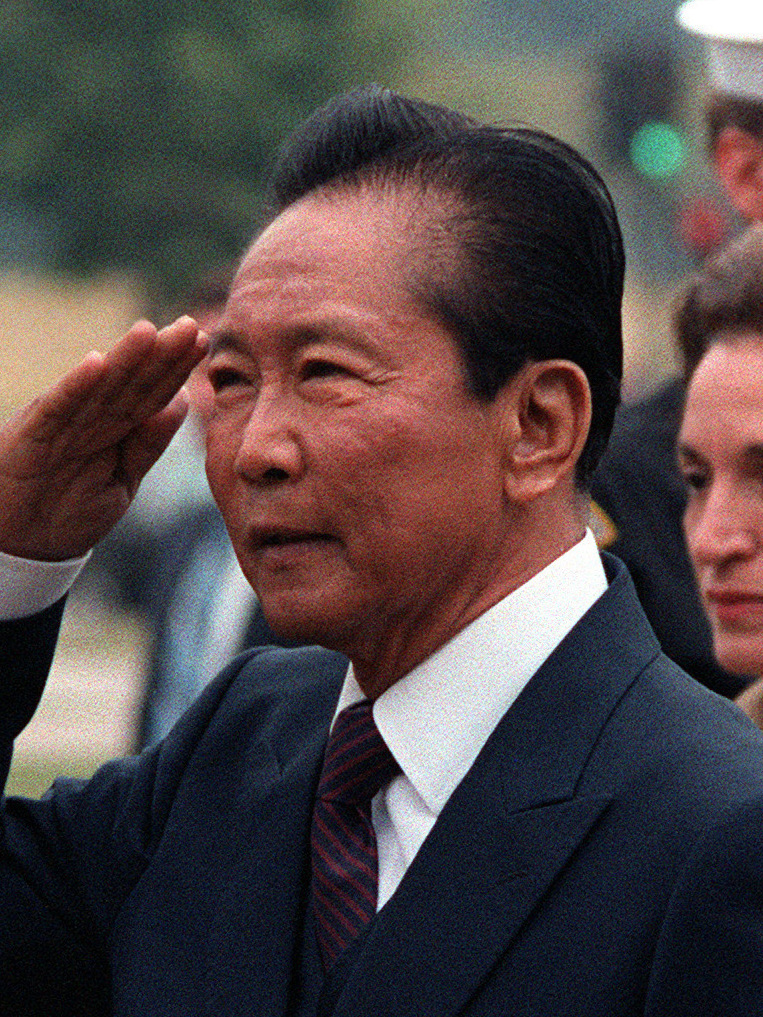

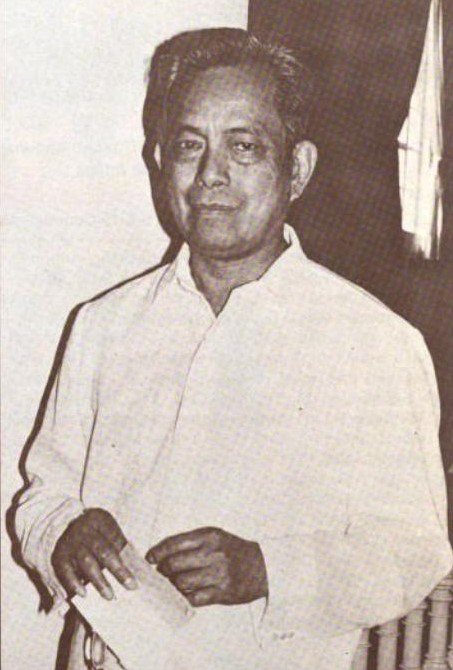
	First party	Second party	Third party
Leader	Ferdinand Marcos	Independents	Nene Pimentel
Party	KBL	Independent	LABAN
Leader since	1978
Percentage			24%
Governors	69	4	—
Governors +/–	+69	+4	—
Mayors	1,550	3	1
Mayors +/–	+1,550	+3	+1

Local elections for governors, vice governors, mayors and vice mayors in the nation's first elections for provincial and municipal officials since the declaration of martial law were held on January 30, 1980. As usual, President Ferdinand Marcos's party the Kilusang Bagong Lipunan dominated the elections. The Lakas ng Bayan and the Liberal Party-backed National Union for Liberation did participate but most of them lost except for some like Nene Pimentel who won the mayoral election in Cagayan de Oro by a landslide.

== Results ==
=== For Governor ===
Summary of the January 30, 1980 Gubernatorial election results
Parties and coalitions	Posts
Kilusang Bagong Lipunan	69
Other Minor Parties	4
Total	73
Source: Philippine Commission on Elections

=== For Mayor ===
Summary of the January 30, 1980 Mayoral election results
Parties and coalitions	Posts
Kilusang Bagong Lipunan	1,550
Other Minor Parties	3
Lakas ng Bayan	1
Total	1,554
Source: Philippine Commission on Elections

== See also ==
- Commission on Elections
- Politics of the Philippines
- Philippine elections
