= Bob Martinez =

Governor of Florida from 1987 to 1991

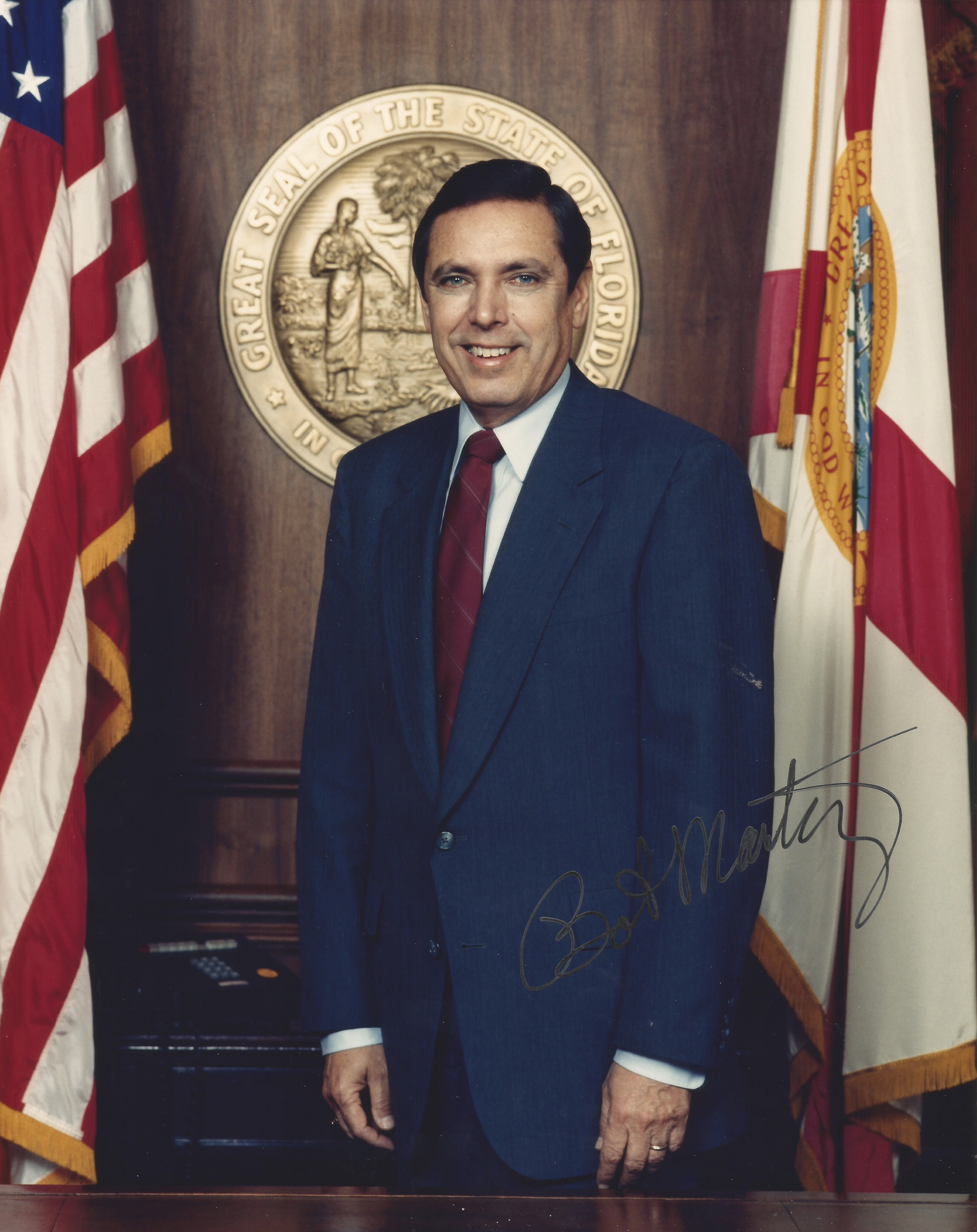

Director of the Office of National Drug Control Policy
- In office March 28, 1991 – January 20, 1993
- President: George H. W. Bush
- Preceded by: Bill Bennett
- Succeeded by: John Walters (acting)

40th Governor of Florida
- In office January 6, 1987 – January 8, 1991
- Lieutenant: Bobby Brantley
- Preceded by: Wayne Mixson
- Succeeded by: Lawton Chiles

54th Mayor of Tampa
- In office October 1, 1979 – July 16, 1986
- Preceded by: Bill Poe
- Succeeded by: Sandra Freedman

Personal details
- Born: Robert Martinez; December 25, 1934 (age 91) Tampa, Florida, U.S.
- Party: Democratic (before 1983); Republican (1983–present)
- Spouse: Mary Marino (m. 1954)
- Children: 2
- Education: University of Tampa (BS); University of Illinois, Urbana-Champaign (MS)

Robert Martinez (born December 25, 1934) is an American retired politician who served as the 40th governor of Florida from 1987 to 1991. A member of the Republican Party, Martinez was the first Hispanic American governor since colonial Florida.

Martinez was born and raised in Tampa, Florida, attended the University of Tampa, and began his career as an educator in the local public school system and then the University of Tampa. In 1965, he was named the director of the local teachers' union, a position he held during the Florida statewide teachers' strike of 1968. He first entered politics with an unsuccessful run for mayor of Tampa in 1974, then won the office in Tampa's next mayoral election in 1979 and was reelected in 1983. During his second term as mayor, Martinez switched his party affiliation from Democrat to Republican, upsetting some supporters in heavily Democratic Tampa. He resigned the position in 1986 to focus on his ultimately successful campaign for the governorship of Florida. His single term as governor was controversial due to the passage and repeal of an unpopular state sales tax on services and an anti-obscenity campaign targeting Miami rappers 2 Live Crew, who later recorded a derogatory song attacking Martinez. He lost his reelection campaign to former U.S. Senator Lawton Chiles in 1990.

After his time as governor, Martinez was appointed Director of the Office of National Drug Control Policy by President George H. W. Bush. Martinez held that position from 1991 until 1993 when he returned to Tampa and became a business consultant and a board member of several local educational organizations.

== Early life and career ==
Bob Martinez was born in Tampa, Florida on December 25, 1934, the only child of Serafín Martínez and Ida Carreño Martínez. His grandparents were Spanish immigrants who had come to Tampa from the province of Asturias to find work in the Spanish/Cuban/Italian neighborhood of Ybor City. Bob Martinez's mother was a seamstress and his father was a waiter at the Columbia Restaurant in Ybor City, and the family lived in Ybor City and West Tampa during his youth. Martinez graduated from Jefferson High School in 1953 and earned a bachelor's degree from the University of Tampa in 1957.

For several years, he taught civics at local high schools. He taught at Oak Grove Junior High for three and a half years, starting in 1957.

He then went back to college and earned a master's degree in labor and industrial relations at the University of Illinois in 1964 and returned to Tampa, working as a business labor consultant. He also taught as an economics instructor at the University of Tampa, in the summer of 1965.

Shortly after graduating, he taught at Chamberlain High School for three and a half years. During his time as a teacher there he became involved with the Hillsborough Classroom Teachers Association.

=== HCTA ===
In 1965, Martinez was named the executive director of the Hillsborough Classroom Teachers Association (HCTA), the local teachers' union in Hillsborough County.

In 1968, the HCTA joined the Florida Education Association's statewide teacher strike in support of more education funding and collective bargaining rights for teachers. Though the labor action was seemingly unsuccessful in the short term, its goals were gradually met over the following few years through court and legislative actions. In 1971, Martinez and the HCTA negotiated the first union contract for Hillsborough County teachers.

== Political career ==
In 1974, Martinez unsuccessfully ran for mayor of Tampa against William "Bill" Poe. He resigned as executive director of the HCTA in 1975 and was appointed vice-chairman of the Southwest Florida Water Management District by Florida Governor Reubin Askew. He also ran Cafe Sevilla, his family's restaurant in West Tampa.

=== Mayor of Tampa ===
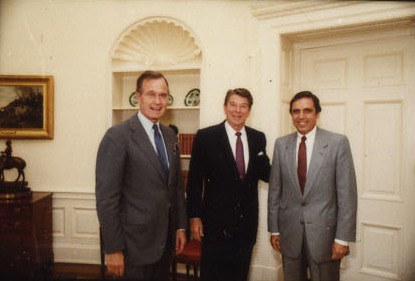
Martinez with Ronald Reagan and George H. W. Bush in 1983

Martinez campaigned for mayor against Poe again in 1979 and won. During Martinez's term of office, the city built one of America's first waste-to-energy plants, opened a large performing arts center and a modern convention center, completely reconstructed Lowry Park Zoo, restored the 1915 City Hall building, and annexed thousands of acres of unincorporated land northeast of town that would become the neighborhood of New Tampa.

Although the mayor's office is nonpartisan, Martinez was known to be a Democrat. However, in 1983, he changed his party affiliation to Republican after meeting with Ronald Reagan when the president was in Tampa to give a speech, causing some dismay among local supporters and leading to speculation that he may eventually run for higher office. Martinez's national profile increased in 1984, when he delivered a speech at the Republican National Convention, and in 1985, when he was elected to the board of directors of the National League of Cities.

== Governor of Florida ==
=== 1986 election ===
In early 1985, Martinez began actively exploring the possibility of running for governor of Florida, and he formally announced his candidacy in November of that year. In July 1986, he resigned as mayor of Tampa to devote all of his time to the gubernatorial campaign.

Martinez defeated former U.S. Representative Louis Frey Jr., of Winter Park in the Republican gubernatorial primary election and Democratic state representative Steve Pajcic in the 1986 Florida gubernatorial election. With the election victory, Martinez became the second Republican governor of Florida since Reconstruction and the first Hispanic governor in Florida history. He was inaugurated on January 6, 1987.

=== Tenure ===
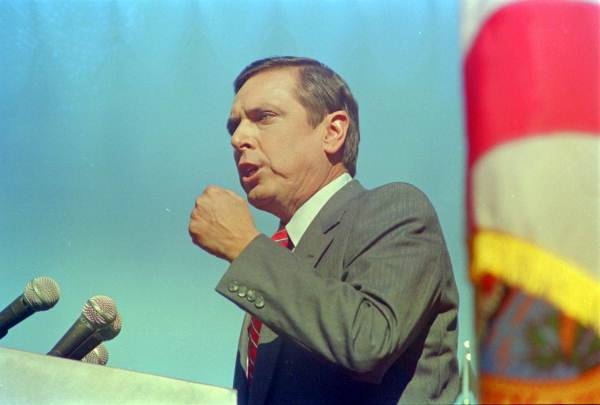
Martinez gives his inauguration speech on January 6, 1987.

As governor, Martinez initiated America's largest environmental land acquisition program, Preservation 2000. He proposed the Surface Water Improvement Management Act that protects Florida's surface waters, including Lake Okeechobee, Tampa Bay, Lake Jackson, the Kissimmee River, and other areas. He helped get Florida's first solid waste management law passed and implemented Florida's Growth Management Act. He was an advocate of laws and rules that protected manatees and dolphins. He aggressively sought to eliminate wasteful spending projects sponsored by members of the legislature and increased spending on the state's drug control programs. For a time, Martinez was regarded as a "rising star" in Republican politics.

In 1987, following the destruction of the Space Shuttle Challenger the previous year, Martinez appointed a number of the aerospace industry and community leaders to the "Florida Governor's Commission on Space." This concept was undertaken by Stephen Lee Morgan, vice chairman and executive director of the Florida Space Business Roundtable, Inc., a non-profit organization of Central Florida aerospace industry executives. Martinez appointed Martin Marietta executive A. Thomas Young as chairman of the commission, with then-Florida Secretary of Commerce Jeb Bush (later Governor of Florida himself), as vice-chairman. The commission was widely hailed as a leader in the arena of state-sponsored economic development initiatives in the aerospace industry, and led to the establishment of the Spaceport Florida Authority, following the release of its formal report, "Steps to the Stars" in 1988 (drafted under the direction of the Florida Department of Commerce's Dr. Chris Shove). While now defunct, the Florida Spaceport Authority did orchestrate several commercial launches from unused launch facilities at Cape Canaveral, Florida, including America's return to the Moon with an unmanned orbiting vehicle aboard a Lockheed Martin rocket, the Athena (then called the "Lockheed Launch Vehicle" or "LLV"). The Authority was succeeded by an organization known as "Space Florida." The purpose of the commission was to identify approaches and specific actions which the State might take to mitigate Florida's reliance on the Space Shuttle program as an employer in the space industry. Results were mixed, with some successes and a number of programs that bore little fruit.

In order to raise more revenue for the state, the Florida legislature passed a sales tax on services with Martinez's support. The response from Floridians was strongly negative, so only two months after the tax went into effect, Martinez called the legislature back for a special session to repeal it. Though the tax was repealed and replaced by a traditional sales tax on goods, the perceived flip-flop on the issue seriously hurt the governor's credibility among Floridians and reduced his ability to get his initiatives enacted.

In 1989, Martinez vowed to "clear Death Row" and signed over 90 death warrants, with only nine of them being successful, including the warrant signed for Ted Bundy. That same year Martinez ordered state prosecutors to determine whether Miami-area rappers 2 Live Crew's album As Nasty as They Wanna Be violated Florida obscenity laws. As a result, record store owners were arrested for selling the album, and members of the group were arrested after a concert. All arrested parties were eventually acquitted. On Banned in the U.S.A., their follow-up album, 2 Live Crew included a song entitled "Fuck Martinez".

In the fall of 1989, after a U.S. Supreme Court ruling allowed states greater flexibility to restrict abortions, Martinez promptly called the Florida Legislature into special session in an effort to pass anti-abortion laws. The special session was a debacle as none of the governor's proposals made it out of committee and his approval ratings sank to around 24%.

=== 1990 election ===
In 1990, Time magazine referred to Martinez as "embattled" as he authorized a statewide television advertisement campaign boasting about his deeds, which were largely unpopular. Martinez was unpopular within his own party by the time of the 1990 gubernatorial election, in which he suffered a landslide defeat against Democratic nominee, former United States Senator Lawton Chiles. As of 2026, Martinez is the last Florida governor to lose reelection.

== Post elected-office ==
After leaving the governor's office on January 8, 1991, Martinez was appointed by President George H. W. Bush to the cabinet rank position of Director of the Office of National Drug Control Policy (or "Drug Czar") where he served until January 20, 1993.

Since then, Martinez has served as a consultant to Florida-based businesses and law firms and is a political analyst for Bay News 9 television. He is a trustee of the University of Tampa, and a director of the Hillsborough Education Foundation, Tampa's Lowry Park Zoo and the Tampa Bay History Center, all local nonprofit groups involved in some way with education.

== Personal life ==
Bob Martinez married the former Mary Jane Marino in 1954, soon after they graduated from Tampa Jefferson High School. They have two children, Robert Alan Martinez and Sharon Martinez.

== See also ==
- List of American politicians who switched parties in office
- List of minority governors and lieutenant governors in the United States

Political offices
Preceded by Bill Poe	Mayor of Tampa; 1979–1986	Succeeded by Sandra Freedman
Preceded by Wayne Mixson	Governor of Florida; 1987–1991	Succeeded by Lawton Chiles
Preceded by Bill Bennett	Director of the Office of National Drug Control Policy; 1991–1993	Succeeded by John Walters; Acting
Party political offices
Preceded by Skip Bafalis	Republican nominee for Governor of Florida; 1986, 1990	Succeeded by Jeb Bush
U.S. order of precedence (ceremonial)
Preceded by Martha McSally as Former US Senator	Order of precedence of the United States; Within Florida	Succeeded by Jeb Bush as Former Governor
Preceded by Rick Snyder as Former Governor	Order of precedence of the United States; Outside Florida	Succeeded by Jeb Bush as Former Governor
