= Hillsborough Classroom Teachers Association =

Union representing teachers in Hillsborough County, Florida

- Founded: 1921
- Headquarters: Tampa, Florida
- Location: United States
- Affiliations: Florida Education Assoc.; National Education Assoc.; Federation of Teachers; AFL-CIO
- Website: hillsboroughcta.org

The Hillsborough Classroom Teachers Association is union representing teachers within the Hillsborough County, Florida School District.

== Background ==
It was founded in 1921, as a committee within the Hillsborough County Education Foundation. In 1965, it broke away to become a separate entity.

In 1968, the union took part in the Florida Education Association's statewide strike of teachers for more education funding and collective bargaining rights.

== See also ==
- Florida statewide teachers' strike of 1968
