= 1975 Andorran parliamentary election =

- 12 December 1975 (first round); 19 December 1975 (second round)
- 12 of the 24 seats in the General Council
Party	Vote %	Seats	+/–
Independents	100	12	0
This lists parties that won seats. See the complete results below.

Parliamentary elections were held in Andorra on 12 December 1975 to elect half of the members of the General Council. In constituencies where not all seats were filled in the first round, a second round was held on 19 December. They were the first elections in which women could be candidates.

The elections were held alongside local elections.

== Electoral system ==
Each parish had four seats in the General Council. The seats were elected on a staggered basis, with two members elected from each parish every two years. In Andorra la Vella parish two members represented the town of Andorra la Vella and two represented Les Escaldes, with one member elected from each every two years.

All candidates had to run on lists of candidates, although voters could split their votes between candidates on different lists. Any candidate receiving a majority of the vote was elected in the first round. If there were remaining seats to fill, a second round was held, in which candidates had to receive a majority of the vote to be elected. If there were still remaining seats to fill, a third round would be held in which the candidate(s) with the most votes would be elected.

== Results ==
Party	First round			Second round			Total seats
Party	Votes	%	Seats	Votes	%	Seats	Total seats
Independents			11			1	12
Total			11			1	12
Source: La Vanguardia

=== Elected members ===
Constituency	Elected members
Andorra la Vella	Eduard Rosell Pujal
Canillo	Josep Casal Puigarnal
Canillo	Xavier Escrivà Torres
Encamp	Josep Marsal Riba
La Massana	Francesc Pons Armengol
La Massana	Joan Fité Mora
Les Escaldes	Martí Parramon
Ordino	Guillem Abellach Baró
Ordino	Joan Naudi Atlle
Sant Julià de Lòria	Òscar Ribas Reig
Sant Julià de Lòria	Valentí Vila Oliva
Source: La Vanguardia
