= 1975 Louisiana lieutenant gubernatorial election =

- November 1, 1975

Nominee	Jimmy Fitzmorris	William Bowen
Party	Democratic	Democratic
Popular vote	924,325	71,830
Percentage	81.80%	6.36%
Nominee	Lance A. Britton	Frederick D. Perkins
Party	Republican	Democratic
Popular vote	67,821	66,019
Percentage	6.00%	5.84%
Lieutenant Governor before election
Jimmy Fitzmorris
Democratic
Elected Lieutenant Governor
Jimmy Fitzmorris
Democratic

The 1975 Louisiana lieutenant gubernatorial election was held on November 1, 1975, in order to elect the lieutenant governor of Louisiana. Democratic candidate and incumbent Lieutenant Governor Jimmy Fitzmorris won re-election against fellow Democratic candidates William Bowen and Frederick D. Perkins and Republican nominee Lance A. Britton.

== General election ==
On election day, November 1, 1975, Democratic candidate Jimmy Fitzmorris won re-election by a margin of 852,495 votes against his foremost opponent and fellow Democratic candidate William Bowen, thereby retaining Democratic control over the office of lieutenant governor. Fitzmorris was sworn in for his second term on March 8, 1976.

=== Results ===
Louisiana lieutenant gubernatorial election, 1975
Party	Candidate	Votes	%
Democratic	Jimmy Fitzmorris (incumbent)	924,325	81.80
Democratic	William Bowen	71,830	6.36
Republican	Lance A. Britton	67,821	6.00
Democratic	Frederick D. Perkins	66,019	5.84
Total votes		1,129,995	100.00
Democratic hold			
