= 1975 Northern Cypriot constitutional referendum =

8 June 1975

Results
Choice	Votes	%
Yes	37,502	99.39%
No	230	0.61%
Registered voters/turnout		70%

A constitutional referendum was held in Northern Cyprus on 8 June 1975. The constitution for the new breakaway state provided for a presidential republic in which the president could serve a maximum of two terms of four years, and for a unicameral parliament of 40 seats. It was approved by 99.39% of voters.

== Results ==
Choice	Votes	%
For	37,502	99.39
Against	230	0.61
Total	37,732	100.00
Registered voters/turnout		70
Source: Direct Democracy
