= Florida Education Association =

Labor union

- Founded: 1886
- Headquarters: Tallahassee, Florida
- Location: United States
- Key people: Andrew Spar, president
- Affiliations: AFT, NEA, AFL–CIO
- Website: feaweb.org

The Florida Education Association (FEA) is a statewide federation of teacher and education workers' labor unions in the US state of Florida. Its 145,000 members make it the largest union in the state. It is a merged affiliate of the American Federation of Teachers (AFT) and the National Education Association (NEA), and is a member of the AFL–CIO.

The FEA was founded in 1886. After leading the nation's first statewide teachers' strike in 1968, the FEA split into two separate federations in 1974. The two groups merged again in 2000.

== Early history ==
The Florida Education Association was established in 1886 as an affiliate of the NEA. It was an association rather than a labor union, and membership was initially limited to white teachers and administrators only. FEA worked to persuade school boards and the public to increase funding for schools, end discrimination against married female schoolteachers, and more.

Local affiliates of the FEA formed in almost every school district. However, membership remained low and varied widely from district to district, even though dues were not high. FEA, like much of the NEA at the time, was dominated by administrators rather than rank-and-file teachers. The administrators' influence often kept FEA from being an effective advocate for classroom teachers. But in larger school districts, the FEA was somewhat successful in obtaining occasional salary increases, improvements to facilities, and curriculum changes. However the FEA in its early years was seen more as a proponent of white teachers specifically. They opposed the efforts of African-American teachers to sue for salary equalization in the 1940s, with their frequent petitions of interventions designed to delay the outcomes of many cases that eventually prevented schools from maintaining separate unequal salary schedule for white and black teachers.

== Beginning of the modern era ==
The modern era of the FEA can be traced to 1963. In that year, Pat Tornillo, a teacher in the Dade County school system, ran for the presidency of the Dade County Classroom Teachers Association (DCCTA). Tornillo won office by calling for greater organizational militancy and the desegregation of teaching staffs.

Tornillo's election was indicative of a wave of militancy in the NEA. Since its inception, the NEA had rejected collective bargaining and strikes as unprofessional. But after the AFT won collective bargaining rights for teachers in New York City and formed the United Federation of Teachers, many NEA members began to push for the association to act more like a union. In 1961, about 200 of the NEA's largest urban locals formed the National Council of Urban Education Associations to push the national organization toward collective bargaining. The caucus was successful: The same year, the NEA Representative Assembly (RA) passed a resolution establishing the "Urban Project", adopting a policy of "professional negotiations" akin to collective bargaining, and requiring the NEA to provide staff, research and financial assistance to locals involved in "professional negotiations". By 1965, the NEA was providing nearly $885,000 a year to locals in support of "professional negotiations", up from a mere $28,000 in 1961. In 1962, pro-unionization forces in the NEA pushed to remove the organization's prohibition against strikes. They were unsuccessful, but did win approval of a "sanctions" policy. "Sanctions" included waging a public relations campaign against the school district, encouraging teachers to not accept teaching positions with the school system, refusing to provide unpaid services (such as tutoring or supervision of clubs), and political action to defeat anti-union politicians. "Sanctions" could be employed against any school district which, in the opinion of the local association, had engaged in "unethical or arbitrary" policies or which had refused "sound professional practices".

Tornillo eagerly embraced professional negotiations and sanctions, and in 1966 he forced the Dade County school system to open negotiations with the DCCTA. Although the national NEA was obligated to provide assistance, the FEA was not and refused to become involved in Tornillo's campaign for professional negotiations. The DCCTA won a contract, but FEA's reluctance to support the local association led Tornillo and other leaders to lobby the state association to become more militant.

=== 1968 statewide teachers' strike ===
The DCCTA's actions set in motion a series of events which led to a statewide Florida teachers' strike in 1968.

Prodded by the DCCTA, the NEA undertook a study of the condition of Florida's public schools. The study, released in 1966, concluded that school funding had actually fallen while enrollment—and the need for more teachers, buildings, and supplies—had soared. Teachers were underpaid, benefits were poor, and school facilities in bad shape. The report electrified teachers in Florida, and Dade, Broward, and Hillsborough counties were placed under sanction.

FEA began to lobby the state for more funding for public schools. State legislative action had often been the only way for NEA locals to win better pay and working conditions prior to the enactment of the professional negotiations policy, so FEA was no newcomer to politics. The association lobbied for a minimum teacher salary of $5,000 a year and a more equitable means of funding schools than property taxes. Republican Governor Claude R. Kirk Jr. promised to improve educational funding. The Democratic-controlled state legislature approved higher sales taxes. But Kirk vetoed the budget, and Republican legislators upheld the veto.

Outraged by the veto, Florida teachers went on a statewide strike—the first statewide teachers' strike in American history. An August 1967 rally at the Tangerine Bowl in Orlando drew 30,000 teachers. Even though public employee strikes are illegal in Florida, FEA leaders began talking up a statewide strike. In September 1967, most of the teachers in Pinellas and Broward counties resigned in protest, forcing schools to close. A court ordered the teachers back into the classroom, but hundreds stayed out.

Despite government action, the teachers struck again. Gov. Kirk called a special session of the legislature in January 1968, which led to higher sales and sin taxes. But most teachers felt the increases were not enough, and a special convention of the FEA voted against accepting the package. In February 1968, FEA president Jane Arnold said the state association would support local teachers if they walked off the job. Thousands did. Schools closed in roughly two-thirds of Florida's counties. At the height of the strike, 25,712 teachers—about 40 percent of the state's teachers—walked out. The statewide Florida teachers' strike was not uniform, however. Strikes lasted only a few days in some districts, while in others teachers walked picket lines for weeks. In Pinellas County, teachers stayed out for six weeks. Small groups of teachers struck for as long as three months. Arnold and other FEA leaders were threatened with arrest. Tornillo was fined $30,000 and given two-year jail term (which, after appeal, he was not forced to serve).

In the end the strike was not successful. Gov. Kirk and the legislature refused to appropriate more money or raise taxes further. School districts hired substitute teachers as strikebreakers, and local businesses paid their employees to teach classes. Public support for the teachers, weak at the beginning of the strike, shrunk dramatically after the first several weeks. "'We thought they [the public] would be with us,' Arnold said. 'We thought it would unite the community and the teachers. It did a little bit of the opposite. ... A lot of teachers lost their innocence. They thought the community liked them.'" Local education associations began to negotiate their own settlements, often agreeing not to challenge school districts for terminating the most militant teachers.

=== Securing the right to bargain ===
Although the 1968 strike did not achieve the goals the FEA had set, FEA members were radicalized by the strike and the association won other victories.

Later in 1968, the Florida Supreme Court ruled in Pinellas County Classroom Teachers Association v. Board of Public Instruction, 214 So. 2d 34 (September 18, 1968), that state law did not prohibit public employees (such as teachers) from bargaining collectively. However, the court also said that public employees did not have the right to strike.

A year later, the Florida Supreme Court ruled that teachers had a constitutional right to bargain collectively. In 1968, two newly employed teachers and the Dade County Education Association, Local 1875, AFT, sued the Board of Public Instruction of Dade County and DCCTA. In an ironic twist, AFT argued that the school board's collective bargaining relationship with DCCTA was unconstitutional under Florida's constitution. The AFT's strategy was to break DCCTA's collective bargaining relationship, then organize the teachers in Dade County itself. But after the lawsuit had been filed, Florida voters in November 1968 approved a new state constitution. In mid-1969, the Florida Supreme Court held in Dade County Classroom Teachers Association v. Ryan, 225 So. 2d 903 (July 9, 1969), that both the old and new Florida constitutions gave all employees—whether employed in the public or private sector—the right to bargain collectively. The court did not hold that public employees had the right to strike or that the state had a duty bargain with its employees or their organization, but the mere affirmation of public-sector collective bargaining rights was a major victory for FEA.

== FEA splits ==
External and internal pressures caused two organizational splits in the Florida Education Association in the 1970s.

The external pressure came from the American Federation of Teachers. FEA had spent nearly $1 million supporting local associations in the 1968 strike, leaving it financially weakened. The strike had drawn the AFT's attention, and—sensing that teachers in Florida were ripe for organizing—the union had begun establishing local affiliates in the state shortly thereafter. The AFT convinced FEA president-elect Louise Alford to leave FEA and work for the AFT, and later persuaded Richard Batchelder (a former president of the NEA) to do the same. Soon the AFT had a number of large, militant locals in the state.

In 1974, the DCCTA disaffiliated from FEA and formed a new statewide teachers' federation, FEA-United. Tornillo began arguing that NEA and AFT should merge in the state of Florida to give educators more power. Tornillo's views carried a great deal of weight because DCCTA was the largest teachers' union in the state, and he was the leader of the militant faction within FEA. But Tornillo's views only worsened the friction between the NEA and AFT in the state. By the end of the year, DCCTA had merged with the AFT affiliate in Dade County and was calling itself the "United Teachers of Dade" (UTD), and Tornillo had convinced education associations representing other large urban school districts in Florida to join the AFT. With more than half of FEA's convention delegates now belonging to the AFT, a statewide merger was inevitable. FEA changed its name to FEA-United and affiliated with the Florida AFL–CIO.

But half of the original FEA affiliates refused to merge. The NEA established a new state organization, the Florida Teaching Profession-National Education Association (FTP-NEA), and roughly half the FEA's original members joined it.

== Collective bargaining and conflict ==
Despite the fragmentation of the FEA, teachers in Florida still were able to achieve a major collective bargaining victory. The militancy of the teachers' unions in Florida, combined with continuing concern over the 1968 strike, prompted the Florida state legislature in 1974 to enact a public employee collective bargaining law. Pat Tornillo helped draft the bill.

Tornillo quickly came to control FEA-United. Although he was not elected president of the federation until 1978, a position he held until 2000, he was the dominant force within the new AFT state federation. In 1981, he was elected a vice president of the AFT and sat on the AFT executive council's influential executive committee.

Under Tornillo, FEA-United proved to be very influential within the Florida AFL–CIO. A quarter of the AFL–CIO's state membership belonged to FEA-United, and the union began exercising its political muscle. In 1993, FEA-United, working with AFCSME, unseated 16-year incumbent state AFL–CIO president Danny Miller. With FEA-United's support, the post was won by Marilyn Lenard, president of the Space Coast Labor Council and a CWA member.

However, conflict between FEA-United and FTP-NEA continued. In March 1983, the AFT successfully raided the FTP-NEA's large Broward association, the Classroom Teachers Association (CTA). The AFT had forced an election for a new bargaining representative three times between 1975 and 1979 but had failed to win the elections. After the 1983 victory, Tony Gentile, a veteran AFT activist who had been president since 1979, became the new bargaining agent for Broward's teachers. In 1990, the AFT also successfully raided the Volusia Education Association, another large FTP-NEA local.

In addition to raiding, both organizations also organized new members. For example, in 1990 FEA-United successfully organized a unit of about 450 blue-collar workers in the Hernando County school district. In 1998, full-time faculty at Miami-Dade Community College also voted to join FEA-United. In fact, during the 1980s both state unions put a high priority on organizing education support professionals across the state. It was during this period that the character of the two organizations changed from being unions that only represented teachers, to representing all categories of public school employees.

But there were losses on both sides as well. In 1980, the Hillsborough Classroom Teachers Association, the Collier County Education Association, and the Hendry County Education Association disaffiliated from FEA-United over Tornillo's increasingly dictatorial approach to running the state union, and became independent unions. Four years later all three locals chose to become affiliates of the Florida Teaching Profession-National Education Association. In 1982 the United Faculty of Florida, representing university faculty on all campuses of Florida's State University System, as well as a number of community college faculties, switched affiliation from FEA/United to FTP-NEA. In addition, in 1985 the FEA/United affiliate in Charlotte County was defeated by the two new FTP-NEA affiliates and lost the right to represent teachers and support personnel. In 1998, the Sarasota County Classified/Teachers Association—FEA-United's fourth-largest affiliate—voted to become independent as well, arguing that FEA-United had not done enough to service the local's contract.

But despite the conflict, the two unions remained remarkably evenly matched. By 1987, FTP-NEA's membership had risen to about 37,000 members, while FEA-United's membership stood at about 30,000 members. By 2000, when the two unions merged, FTP-NEA membership had risen to 60,000 while FEA-United had 45,000.

== Merger ==
By 1990, FEA-United and FTP-NEA were talking merger. Despite 15 years of competition, neither union had achieved an overwhelming majority among the state's teachers. Worse, the problems confronting the state's schools had not improved much since the mid-1970s. With state politics trending more and more conservative, both unions felt merger would be advantageous. But continuing conflict between the two unions kept merger talks from progressing very far.

The conditions for merger improved in the mid-1990s. In 1996, the national NEA and AFT signed a no-raid agreement. The unions encouraged each state to also sign no-raid and jurisdictional agreements, and both teachers' federations in Florida quickly did so.

With raiding no longer causing tensions between FTP-NEA and FEA-United, a merger was quickly agreed to. FTP-NEA's Board of Directors signed off on the terms of a merger in April 1998, with FEA-United following suit in June. Members of each organization approved the merger in April and May 1999, and a founding convention was held in June 2000. The combined federation, now calling itself by its original name, represented about 240,000 members and was the largest labor organization in the state. Maureen Dinnen, a Broward County community college professor, was elected president. She subsequently won election as an AFT vice president as well.

== Post-merger ==
=== Political effectiveness ===
Since the merger in 2000, FEA has been involved in a number of political battles. Florida's governor's office and state legislature have been dominated by Republicans, who have proven legislatively active and willing to experiment with a number of new educational policies. FEA, traditionally much more prone to lean Democratic, has engaged in draining and lengthy battles over school vouchers, teacher tenure, merit pay, bonus pay, bans and limitations on the collection of teacher union dues, the teaching of creationism, student testing, classroom overcrowding and salaries.

However, some observers claim the merger has not had positive results. Critics argue that local FEA unions are less effective in collective bargaining, local and state annual dues are too high, young teachers are reluctant to join their local affiliates, and neither the state association nor local unions have done much to protect under-performing teachers from being fired. These critics say the association is are increasingly frozen out of politics. FEA supporters counter that the federation has proven effective despite these odds, and remains a force in state politics. They point to the federation's king-making role in the state's 2002 Democratic gubernatorial primary, where the union's candidate (Bill McBride) defeated a better-known and funded candidate (Janet Reno) and ran a strong campaign against a popular, wealthy incumbent (Gov. Jeb Bush).

=== Scandals ===
FEA has seen a number of scandals since the merger as well. In March 2001, a secretary in the Port Charlotte, Florida, local embezzled $66,000. In July of the same year, long-time Broward Teachers Union president Tony Gentile was arrested during an Internet sting operation. In a settlement package, the local union paid him for unused sick and vacation time and a retirement contribution valued at $120,000. In February 2003, $40,000 was embezzled from the St. Lucie County Classroom Teachers Association. And in April 2003, the FBI and Miami police raided the headquarters of the United Teachers of Dade after receiving a tip that president Pat Tornillo had embezzled or misspent millions of dollars in union dues. Critics and supporters worry that the scandals are symbolic of deeper organizational and financial control problems within FEA.

=== Successes ===
FEA has also had a number of successes. The union successfully challenged the state's school voucher law, and beat back a 2002 state attempt to give local school districts the right to privatize public school workers such as bus drivers, cafeteria workers, aides and others. In 2002, the union also successfully organized the full-time professors, counselors and librarians at Florida Community College at Jacksonville after two previous unsuccessful organizing elections.

=== Changes ===
Dinnen retired as FEA president in 2003. She then ran for and won a seat on the Broward County school board. During her tenure as President of the Association she presided over the selection in 2000 of former FTP-NEA President Aaron Wallace as the FEA Chief of Staff.

Andy Ford was elected her successor. Ford was previously the president of Duval Teachers United and part of the team which negotiated the FTP-NEA/FEA-United merger in 2000. He had also been elected the statewide federation's First Vice President in 2000. Ford has focused FEA's energies on internal organizing, grass-roots political mobilization, building stronger and more effective locals, and offering union-provided professional development to all FEA members.

Andrew Spar is the current FEA president. He was formerly the vice president of FEA and took on this position in September 2020 after succeeding former president Fedrick Ingram, who was elected secretary-treasurer of the American Federation of Teachers.

== See also ==
- Hillsborough Classroom Teachers Association
