= 1975 Philippine Sangguniang Bayan elections =

Elections in the Philippines

Sangguniang Bayan elections were held for representatives to the Pambansang Sangguniang Bayan (National Board) on December 10, 1975, after the enactment of Presidential Decree No. 826 signed by President Ferdinand Marcos on November 14, 1975. The said degree renamed the provincial boards and city and municipal councils into Sangguniang Bayan and increased the membership of the local councils. Sangguniang Bayan representatives were also considered as members of the Batasang Bayan.

== Membership in the Sangguniang Bayan ==
In the provinces, the Sangguniang Bayan was composed of the incumbent members of the existing provincial boards, a representative from each of the municipalities within the province, and the President of the Katipunan ng mga Kabataang Barangay in the province. The representative from each of the municipalities shall be chosen among the members of the Sangguniang Bayan in these municipalities.

In the cities and municipalities, it was composed of the members of the existing municipal or city councils, barangay captains, and representatives from other sectors of the community appointed by the President or his duly authorized representative upon the recommendation of the local unit concerned, through the Secretary of Local Government and Community Development and the President of the Katipunan ng Mga Kabataang Barangay in the city or municipality.

The provincial governors, city or municipal mayors acted as presiding officers of the Sangguniang Bayan in their province, city or municipality.

The Sangguniang Bayan inherited the powers, duties and functions of the provincial boards, city councils and municipal councils.

== Barangay elections ==
Elections for the barangay representatives to the Pambansang Sangguniang Bayan (National Board) were held on December 10, 1975, after the enactment of Presidential Decree No. 826 signed by President Ferdinand Marcos on November 14, 1975.

== Sectoral elections ==
Elections for the some 6,000 Sectoral Representatives to represent the four major sectoral groups (Agriculture, Capital-Industrial, Labor and Professionals) in the Pambansang Sangguiniang Bayan (National Board) were held on December 14, 1975.

== Local elections ==
Elections for the 1,387 representatives to the 75 Provincial Sangguniang Bayans (Provincial, Municipal and City Boards) were held on December 23, 1975.
