= Florida AFL–CIO =

- Headquarters building
- Founded: 1958
- Headquarters: Tallahassee, Florida
- Location: United States
- Members: 500,000
- Key people: Mike Williams, president (2022)
- Affiliations: AFL–CIO
- Website: www.flaflcio.org

Florida AFL–CIO is a statewide federation of labor unions in the state of Florida affiliated with the AFL–CIO. The federation's membership consists of about 450 local unions from 41 international unions (or about 500,000 active and retired workers). The headquarters of the organization are located in Tallahassee, Florida.

The Florida AFL–CIO was formed in 1958 with the merger of the Florida State Federation of Labor and the Florida Congress of Industrial Organizations.

The federation engages in legislative and political work, labor movement advocacy, research, and member mobilization and education. In 2005, after the disaffiliation of several unions to the Change to Win Federation (CTW), the Florida AFL–CIO established the United Labor Lobby as a way for AFL–CIO and CTW unions to work together on legislative issues.

The Florida AFL–CIO publishes a bi-weekly newspaper, Solidarity in the Sunshine, as well as a blog, Fight for Florida

The federation also hands out an A. Philip Randolph Award each year. Individuals are nominated by a committee of the Florida AFL–CIO, and the prize awarded at the annual Florida Labor Hall of Fame Gala each odd-numbered year. There may be none or several award recipients in a given year.

== Structure ==
The Florida AFL–CIO is governed by its membership, meeting in convention every odd-numbered year. Members discuss, approve, and implement the policies of the federation, and elect its officers.

Every other convention, the convention elects two executive officers, a president and secretary-treasurer. At every convention, the members elect 42 vice presidents. There are 17 vice presidents nominated from each district of the Florida AFL–CIO, 16 vice presidents nominated by member unions of the federation, five at-large vice presidents, and 4 "constituency group" vice presidents. Between conventions, the two executive officers and 42 board members constitute an executive board which implements the policies of the Florida AFL–CIO. In 2009, Florida AFL–CIO delegates elected Mike Williams, a member of the International Brotherhood of Electrical Workers, Local Union #177, (I.B.E.W. L.U. #177 – Jacksonville, Florida), president. In 2013, Florida AFL–CIO delegates re-elected Mike Williams as president of the federation unanimously, and elected David Pittman as secretary-treasurer.

In even-numbered years, the Florida AFL–CIO hosts a Committee on Political Education (COPE) Convention to endorse candidates, recommend legislative and ballot initiatives, establish positions on legislation and ballot initiatives, and establish the organization's member political education and action efforts.

== Local and regional affiliates ==
Central Labor Councils (CLCs) act as a regional representative for union individuals, union affiliates, and the State Federation. Seen as a go-between for specific interests such as representation and organization; Central Labor Councils arbitrate intermediary issues between members and affiliates, members and the State Federation, and affiliates and the State Federation. Their actions are no way intermediary, however. Often, CLC's are considered a review board of regional issues.

The Florida AFL–CIO has ten regional and/or local central labor councils (CLCs):

- Broward County AFL–CIO – Covering Broward County
- Central Florida AFL–CIO – Covering Lake, Orange, Osceola, and Seminole counties.
- North Central Florida CLC – Covering Alachua, Bradford, Columbia, Dixie, Gilchrist, Hamilton, Lafayette, Levy, Marion, Putnam, Suwannee, and Union counties.
- North Florida CLC – Covering Baker, Clay, Duval, Nassau, and St. Johns counties.
- Northwest Florida Federation of Labor, AFL–CIO Central Labor Council – Covering Bay, Calhoun, Escambia, Franklin, Gadsden, Gulf, Holmes, Jackson, Jefferson, Leon, Liberty, Madison, Okaloosa, Santa Rosa, Taylor, Wakulla, Walton, and Washington counties.
- Palm Beach/Treasure Coast AFL–CIO – Covering Indian River, Martin, Okeechobee, Palm Beach, and St. Lucie counties.
- South Florida AFL–CIO – Covering Charlotte, Collier, Dade, Glades, Hendry, and Lee, and Monroe counties.
- Space Coast AFL–CIO – Covering Brevard county.
- Volusia Flagler AFL–CIO – Covering Flagler, and Volusia counties.
- West Central Florida CLC – Covering Citrus, DeSoto, Hardee, Hernando, Highlands, Hillsborough, Manatee, Pasco, Pinellas, Polk, Sarasota, and Sumter counties.
