= William F. Poe =

American politician (1931–2014)

William Poe

53rd Mayor of Tampa, Florida
- In office 1974-1979
- Preceded by: Lloyd Copeland
- Succeeded by: Bob Martinez

Personal details
- Born: July 22, 1931 Tampa, Florida, U.S.
- Died: May 1, 2014 (aged 82) Tampa, Florida, U.S.
- Spouse: Betty Poe
- Education: Duke University; University of Florida (B.A.)
- Profession: Insurance Executive

William F. Poe (July 22, 1931 – May 1, 2014) was an American politician and businessman who served as the 53rd mayor of Tampa, Florida, from 1974 to 1979. He later served as the Chairman of a Florida-based property and casualty insurance company. He served in the Air Force, and received his bachelor's degree from the University of Florida.

== Early life ==
William F. Poe was born on July 22, 1931, in the Seminole Heights neighborhood of Tampa being the youngest of three children in his family. He would attend Hillsborough High School. While going to Hillsborough High School he would be a member of the student body and the president of its Key Club chapter along with being the senior class treasurer.

After finishing high school he would go to Duke University and later on to the University of Florida where he got his Bachelor of Arts degree in Business Administration. While at the University of Florida, Poe would be the president of Phi Delta Theta fraternity. After college, he would serve in the Air Force for an unspecified period of time being stationed in Japan.

Poe would return to his native Tampa in 1956 and established an insurance company there. Eventually he would get involved in local civic affairs and eventually politics as well at the local level.

== Mayor of Tampa ==
In October 1974, Poe would become mayor defeating Bob Martinez. As mayor he would try to revitalize the downtown area by creating an office building for the Floridian state government along Franklin Street. He would also get the approval of the Tampa City Council to spend $20 million for public works as part of his revitalization attempts. Poe also cracked down on vice elements seen within the city and gave the police department new patrol vehicles. A public information/complaint system was set up as a hotline to contact the municipal government about a variety of issues.

== Later life ==
After leaving office as mayor, he would go back to working in the insurance industry. A public plaza was created in honor of him during 2005 named William F. Poe Plaza.

Political offices
Preceded by Lloyd Copeland	Mayor of Tampa; October 3, 1974-October 1, 1979	Succeeded by Bob Martinez
