= Politics of Rhineland-Palatinate =

Government of a German state

The politics of Rhineland-Palatinate takes place within a framework of a federal parliamentary republic, where the Federal Government of Germany exercises sovereign rights with certain powers reserved to the states of Germany including Rhineland-Palatinate. The state has a multi-party system where the two main parties are the center-right Christian Democratic Union (CDU) and the center-left Social Democratic Party of Germany (SPD).

Every five years, all Germans residing in the State over the age of 18 elect the members of the Rhineland-Palatinate Landtag. This regional parliament or legislature then elects the minister-president and confirms the cabinet members. Rhineland-Palatinate is the only German Bundesland to have a cabinet minister for viticulture (Ministry of Economic Affairs, Transport, Agriculture and Viticulture).

== List of minister-presidents of Rhineland-Palatinate ==
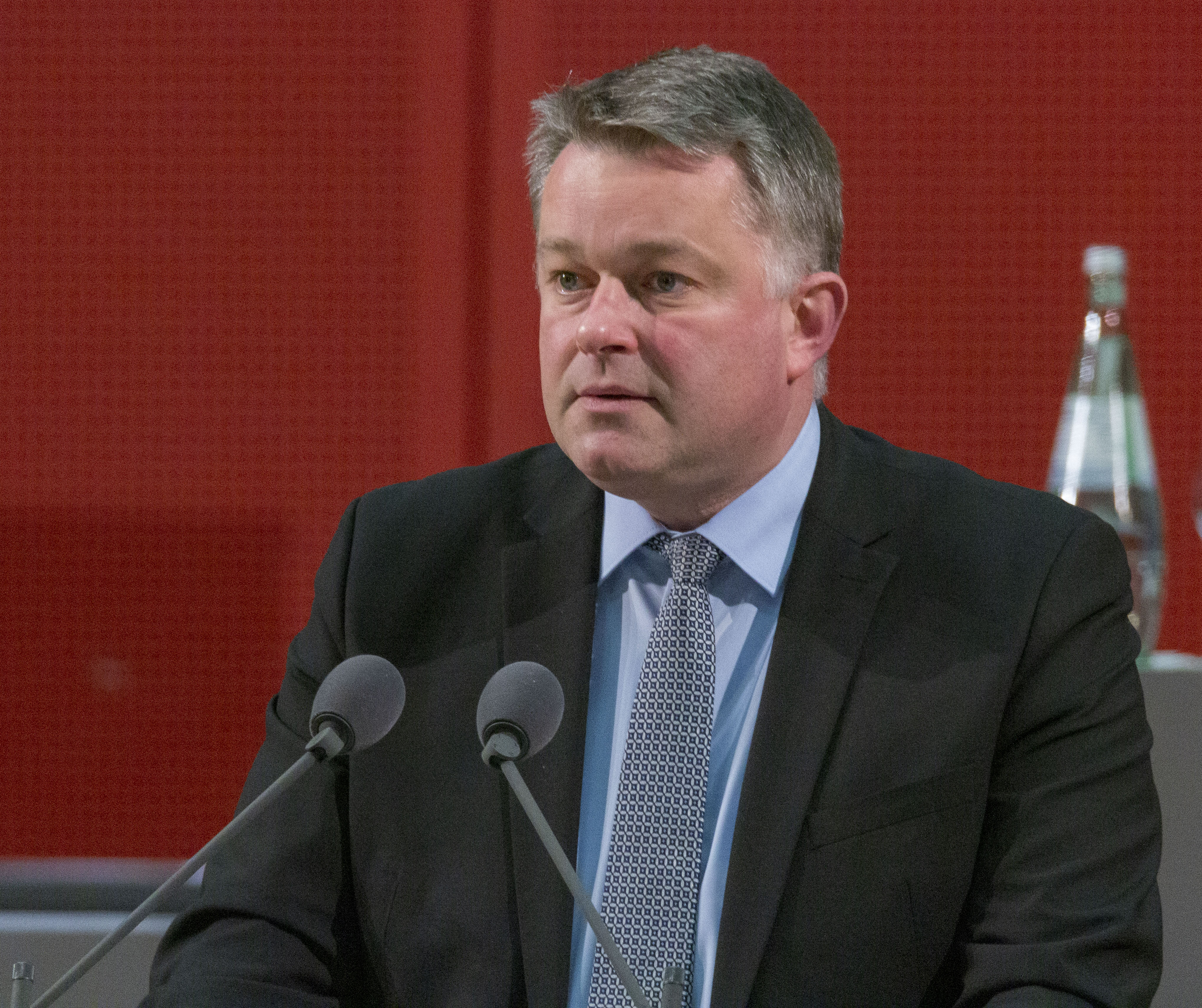
Gordon Schnieder, 2021

- June 13, 1947 - July 9, 1947: Wilhelm Boden, CDU
- 1947 - 1969: Peter Altmeier, CDU
- 1969 - 1976: Helmut Kohl, CDU
- 1976 - 1988: Bernhard Vogel, CDU
- 1988 - 1991: Carl-Ludwig Wagner, CDU
- 1991 - 1994: Rudolf Scharping, SPD
- 1994 - 2013: Kurt Beck, SPD
- 2013 - 2024 Malu Dreyer, SPD
- 2024 - 2026: Alexander Schweitzer, SPD
- Since 2026: Gordon Schnieder, CDU

== Landtag of Rhineland-Palatinate ==
=== Party strength in the Landtag ===
A darkened box under a party in any given year denotes that the party had either not yet been founded, or the party had become defunct, by the date of that election.

Election year	Total seats	Seats won					
Election year	Total seats	CDU	SPD	FDP	Grüne	AfD	Other
1947	101	48	34	11			8 (Note: KPD)
1951	100	43	38	19			
1955	100	51	36	13			
1959	100	52	37	10			1 (Note: DRP)
1963	100	46	43	11			
1967	100	49	39	8			4 (Note: NDP)
1971	100	53	44	3			
1975	100	55	40	5			
1979	100	51	43	6			
1983	100	57	43				
1987	100	48	40	7	5		
1991	101	40	47	7	7		
1996	101	41	43	10	7		
2001	101	38	49	8	6		
2006	101	38	53	10			
2011	101	41	42		18		
2016	101	35	39	7	6	14	
2021	101	31	39	6	10	9	6
2026	105	39	32	0	10	24	

=== Legislative compositions ===
1st Landtag, following 1947 election

2nd Landtag, following 1951 election

3rd Landtag, following 1955 election

4th Landtag, following 1959 election

5th Landtag, following 1963 election

6th Landtag, following 1967 election

7th Landtag, following 1971 election

8th Landtag, following 1975 election

9th Landtag, following 1979 election

10th Landtag, following 1983 election

11th Landtag, following 1987 election

12th Landtag, following 1991 election

13th Landtag, following 1996 election

14th Landtag, following 2001 election

15th Landtag, following 2006 election

16th Landtag, following 2011 election

17th Landtag, following 2016 election

18th Landtag, following 2021 election

19th Landtag, following 2026 election

=== State election results maps ===
1991 Rhineland-Palatinate state election, Red is SPD, Black is CDU

1996 Rhineland-Palatinate state election, Red is SPD, Black is CDU

2001 Rhineland-Palatinate state election, Red is SPD, Black is CDU

2006 Rhineland-Palatinate state election, Red is SPD, Black is CDU

2011 Rhineland-Palatinate state election, Red is SPD, Black is CDU

2016 Rhineland-Palatinate state election, Red is SPD, Black is CDU

2021 Rhineland-Palatinate state election, Red is SPD, Black is CDU

2026 Rhineland-Palatinate state election, Red is SPD, Black is CDU

=== Constituencies in the Landtag ===
- Betzdorf/Kirchen (Sieg) (01)
- Altenkirchen (Westerwald) (02)
- Linz am Rhein/Rengsdorf (03)
- Neuwied (04)
- Bad Marienberg (Westerwald)/Westerburg (05)
- Montabaur (06)
- Diez/Nassau (07)
- Koblenz/Lahnstein (08)
- Koblenz (09)
- Bendorf/Weißsenthurm (10)
- Andernach (11)
- Mayen (12)
- Remagen/Sinzig (13)
- Bad Neuenahr-Ahrweiler (14)
- Cochem-Zell (15)
- Rhein-Hunsrück (16)
- Bad Kreuznach (17)
- Kirn-Bad Sobernheim (18)
- Birkenfeld (19)
- Vulkaneifel (20)
- Bitburg-Prüm (21)
- Wittlich (22)
- Bernkastel-Keus/Morbach/Kirchberg (Hunsrück) (23)
- Trier/Schweich (24)
- Trier (25)
- Konz/Saarburg (26)
- Mainz I (27)
- Mainz II (28)
- Mainz III (29)
- Bingen am Rhein (30)
- Ingelheim am Rhein (31)
- Rhein-Selz/Wonnegau (32)
- Worms (33)
- Alzey (34)
- Frankenthal (Pfalz) (35)
- Ludwigshafen am Rhein I (36)
- Ludwigshafen am Rhein II (37)
- Mutterstadt (38)
- Speyer (39)
- Donnersberg (40)
- Kusel (41)
- Bad Dürkheim (42)
- Neustadt an der Weinstraße (43)
- Kaiserslautern I (44)
- Kaiserslautern II (45)
- Kaiserslautern-Land (46)
- Zweibrücken (47)
- Pirmasens (48)
- Südliche Weinstraße (49)
- Landau in der Pfalz (50)
- Germersheim (51)
- Wörth am Rhein (52)

=== State governments ===
- Boden I (1946–1947)
- Boden II (1947)
- Altmeier I (1947–1951)
- Altmeier II (1951–1955)
- Altmeier III (1955–1959)
- Altmeier IV (1959–1963)
- Altmeier V (1963–1967)
- Altmeier VI (1967–1969)
- Kohl I (1969–1971)
- Kohl II (1971–1975)
- Kohl III (1975–1976)
- Vogel I (1976–1979)
- Vogel II (1979–1983)
- Vogel III (1983–1987)
- Vogel IV (1987–1988)
- Wagner (1988–1991)
- Scharping (1991–1994)
- Beck I (1994–1996)
- Beck II (1996–2001)
- Beck III (2001–2006)
- Beck IV (2006–2011)
- Beck V (2011–2013)
- Dreyer I (2013–2016)
- Dreyer II (2016–2021)
- Dreyer III (2021–2024)
- Schweitzer (2024–2026)
- Schnieder (2026–)

== Constituencies in the Bundestag ==
No	Constituency	Member	2021	Voters	2017	2013	2009	2005	2002	1998	1994	1990
196	Neuwied	Erwin Rüddel	CDU	238,118	CDU	CDU	CDU	SPD	SPD	SPD	CDU	CDU
197	Ahrweiler	Mechthild Heil	CDU	195,109	CDU	CDU	CDU	CDU	CDU	CDU	CDU	CDU
198	Koblenz	Josef Oster	CDU	193,035	CDU	CDU	CDU	CDU	CDU	CDU	CDU	CDU
199	Mosel/Rhein-Hunsrück	Marlon Bröhr	CDU	171,012	CDU	CDU	CDU	CDU	CDU	CDU	CDU	CDU
200	Kreuznach	Joe Weingarten	SPD	182,380	CDU	CDU	CDU	CDU	SPD	SPD	SPD	SPD
201	Bitburg	Patrick Schnieder	CDU	163,493	CDU	CDU	CDU	CDU	CDU	CDU	CDU	CDU
202	Trier	Verena Hubertz	SPD	190,530	CDU	CDU	CDU	CDU	SPD	SPD	CDU	CDU
203	Montabaur	Tanja Machalet	SPD	210,816	CDU	CDU	CDU	CDU	CDU	SPD	CDU	CDU
204	Mainz	Daniel Baldy	SPD	249,630	CDU	CDU	CDU	SPD	SPD	SPD	CDU	CDU
205	Worms	Jan Metzler	CDU	212,943	CDU	CDU	SPD	SPD	SPD	SPD	SPD	SPD
206	Ludwigshafen/Frankenthal	Christian Schreider	SPD	210,969	CDU	CDU	CDU	SPD	SPD	SPD	CDU	CDU
207	Neustadt – Speyer	Johannes Steiniger	CDU	219,416	CDU	CDU	CDU	CDU	CDU	CDU	CDU	CDU
208	Kaiserslautern	Matthias Mieves	SPD	224,701	SPD	SPD	SPD	SPD	SPD	SPD	SPD	SPD
209	Pirmasens	Angelika Glöckner	SPD	174,093	CDU	CDU	CDU	CDU	CDU	SPD	CDU	CDU
210	Südpfalz	Thomas Hitschler	SPD	217,000	CDU	CDU	CDU	CDU	CDU	CDU	CDU	CDU
