= Rainer Brüderle =

German politician (born 1945)

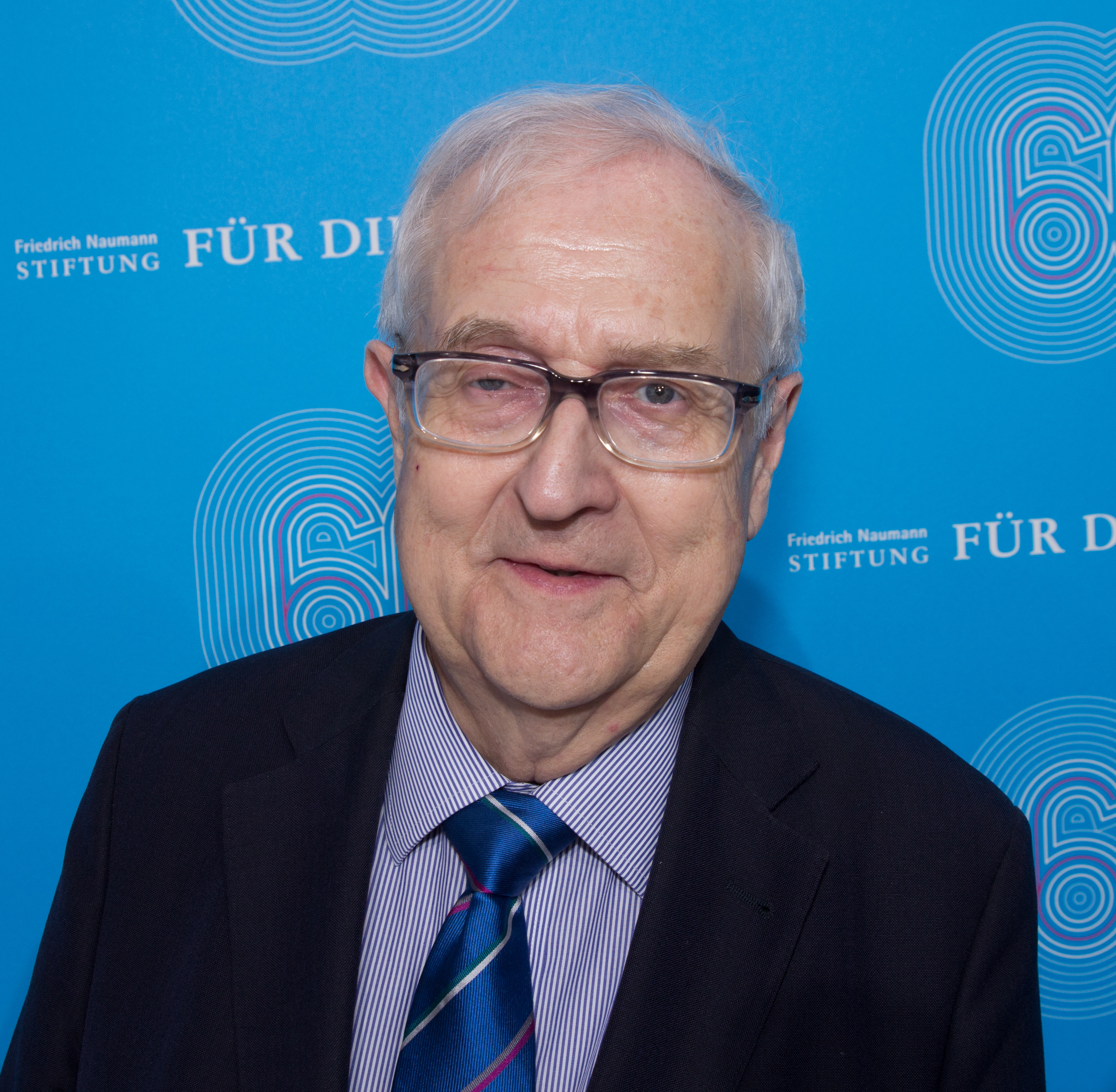
- Brüderle in 2018 at an event hosted by the Friedrich Naumann Foundation

Minister for Economic Affairs and Technology
- In office 28 October 2009 – 12 May 2011
- Chancellor: Angela Merkel
- Preceded by: Karl-Theodor zu Guttenberg
- Succeeded by: Philipp Rösler

Leader of the Free Democratic Party in the Bundestag
- In office 12 May 2011 – 22 October 2013
- Whips: Jörg van Essen; Christian Ahrendt; Otto Fricke; Claudia Winterstein
- Deputy: Volker Wissing; Martin Lindner; Florian Toncar; Heinrich Kolb; Gisela Piltz; Patrick Döring
- Preceded by: Birgit Homburger
- Succeeded by: Christian Lindner (2017)

Member of the Bundestag for Rhineland-Palatinate
- In office 26 October 1998 – 22 October 2013
- Constituency: Free Democratic Party List
State political posts
Deputy Minister-President of Rhineland-Palatinate
In office 8 December 1988 – 12 November 1998
Minister-President	Carl-Ludwig Wagner; Rudolf Scharping; Kurt Beck
Preceded by	Carl-Ludwig Wagner
Succeeded by	Peter Caesar
Chairman of the Free Democratic Party of Rhineland-Palatinate
In office 1983 – 7 May 2011
Preceded by	Hans-Günther Heinz
Succeeded by	Volker Wissing
Minister for Economy, Transportation, Agriculture and Viticulture of Rhineland-Palatinate (Note: Office known as "Minister for Economy and Transportation" from 1987 to 1994.)
In office 23 June 1987 – 12 November 1998
Minister-President	Bernhard Vogel; Carl-Ludwig Wagner; Rudolf Scharping; Kurt Beck
Preceded by	Rudi Geil
Succeeded by	Hans-Artur Bauckhage
Member of the Landtag of Rhineland-Palatinate for Bezirksliste 3 (Wahlkreis 3; 1987–1991)
In office 1987 – 30 November 1998
Preceded by	multi-member district
Succeeded by	Jürgen Creutzmann

Personal details
- Born: 22 June 1945 (age 81) Berlin, Allied-occupied Germany (now Germany)
- Party: Free Democratic Party
- Education: University of Mainz

Rainer Brüderle (German pronunciation: [ˈʁaɪnɐ ˈbʁyːdɐlə]; born 22 June 1945) is a German politician and member of the Free Democratic Party (FDP). He served as Minister of Economics and Transport of Rhineland-Palatinate from 1987–1998. On 28 October 2009, he was appointed Federal Minister for Economics and Technology in the second cabinet of Chancellor Angela Merkel. Following his election in May 2011 as chairman of his party's parliamentary group, Brüderle resigned as Federal Minister for Economic Affairs and Technology.

== Early life and education ==
Brüderle was born in Berlin, and grew up in Landau. He was an exchange student in Lyon.

Brüderle holds a Diplom in Economics from the University of Mainz. He also earned a doctorate and worked at the university until he entered politics, first at the municipal level and then at the state level, for Rhineland Palatinate.

== Political career ==
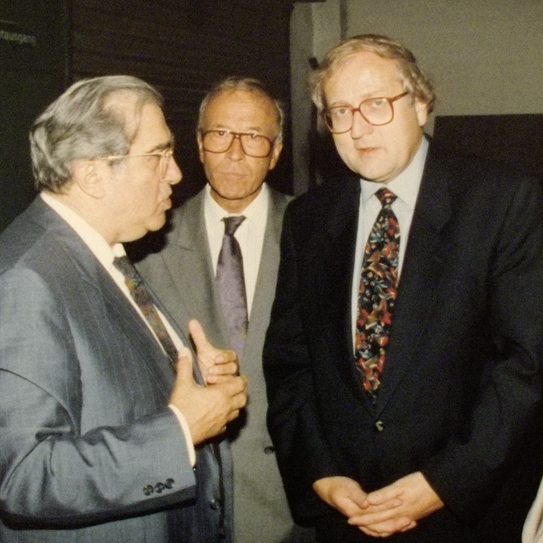
Brüderle (right) in 1993

Brüderle served as a member of the German Bundestag between 1998 and 2013. At the 2009 election he unsuccessfully contested the Mainz constituency, but was elected to the Bundestag for the Rhineland-Palatinate land list.

=== Minister for Economic Affairs and Technology, 2009–2011 ===
Petrol prices

In May 2008, Brüderle said, for two-thirds of every gas station bill supported by the State responsibility. He demanded to abolish the road tax in addition to the eco-tax, it is sufficient if "only the real consumption" will be touched by mineral oil from the Treasury. Neither he as economy minister in the federal government since 2009 nor the FDP voiced these demands again.

State aid for Opel

On 9 June 2010 Brüderle refused a request from Opel Germany to 1.1 billion euro in the form of state aid. On the same day Chancellor Angela Merkel gave Opel vague hope of a bailout stating: "The last word on the future of Opel is still out." "The state is not the better entrepreneur" was a justification Brüderle for his vote. The state aid would have resulted in his opinion, to serious distortions of competition in the industry. However, a government decision, there was not, as General Motors and Opel / Vauxhall in Europe applied for no more state aid.

Unbundling law

This would allow the State to dismantle dominant corporations (even without concrete reason) when the competition can not otherwise be made. The German power companies then turned against such a bill. In May 2010 Brüderle defused the bill.

Financial crisis

On 14 September 2011, Brüderle announced that an article written for the newspaper Die Welt by Vice Chancellor Philipp Rösler, about the possible benefits of a Greek bankruptcy for the rest of the euro zone, confirmed the opinion of a number of European finance ministers.

=== Chairman of the FDP parliamentary group, 2011–2013 ===
During his time in office, Brüderle mainly focused on European policy issues as a result of the continent's sovereign debt crisis. By 2012, in the face of growing criticism of the Merkel government's policies, he publicly stated that Germany "could reach the stage at which a referendum on Europe becomes necessary."

In January 2013, party chairman Philipp Rösler offered to the party leadership to step down in favour of Brüderle, then the favoured choice of many FDP members to lead the party into that year's national election. Brüderle declined, and both agreed that Rösler would stay on as party leader, while Brüderle would be the face of the FDP's election campaign.

== Other activities ==
=== State agencies ===
- Federal Network Agency for Electricity, Gas, Telecommunications, Posts and Railway (BNetzA), Member of the Advisory Board (1998–2009)
- Landesbank Rheinland-Pfalz, Member of the Board of Guarantors (1998–2008)

=== Corporate boards ===
- KfW, Ex-officio Member of the Board of Supervisory Directors (2009–2011)
- Deutsche Bank, Member of the Advisory Board (1998–2009)
- Provinzial Rheinland Versicherung AG, Member of the Supervisory Board (2005-2006)
- IVA Valuation & Advisory AG, Member of the Supervisory Board (2005–2009; since 2011)
- RSBK Strategie Beratung Kommunikation AG, Member of the Advisory Board (2005–2009; since 2013)

=== Non-profits ===
- ZDF, Member of the Broadcasting Board
- Center of Market-Oriented Product and Production Management (CMPP), Member of the Advisory Board
- Stiftung Auge, Member of the Board of Trustees (since 2009)
- German-Israeli Business Association, Member of the Board of Trustees (since 200?)
- Rationalisierungs- und Innovationszentrum der Deutschen Wirtschaft, Member of the Board of Trustees (2009–2013)

== Personal life ==
Brüderle lives in Mainz. He maintains a holiday residence in Lehigh Acres, Florida.

In the magazine Stern in January 2013, journalist Laura Himmelreich published an article about alleged advances towards her from Brüderle during a January 2012 political gathering at a bar in Stuttgart. The advances included asking her for a dance and mainly the suggestive comment that she "could also fill a dirndl", which she interpreted as sexism, sparking a media-wide debate.

== See also ==
- Sustainable development
