= 1991 Rhineland-Palatinate state election =

German state election

- 21 April 1991

All 101 seats of the Landtag of Rhineland-Palatinate 51 seats needed for a majority
- Turnout: 2,125,407 (73.9%) ▼3.1%
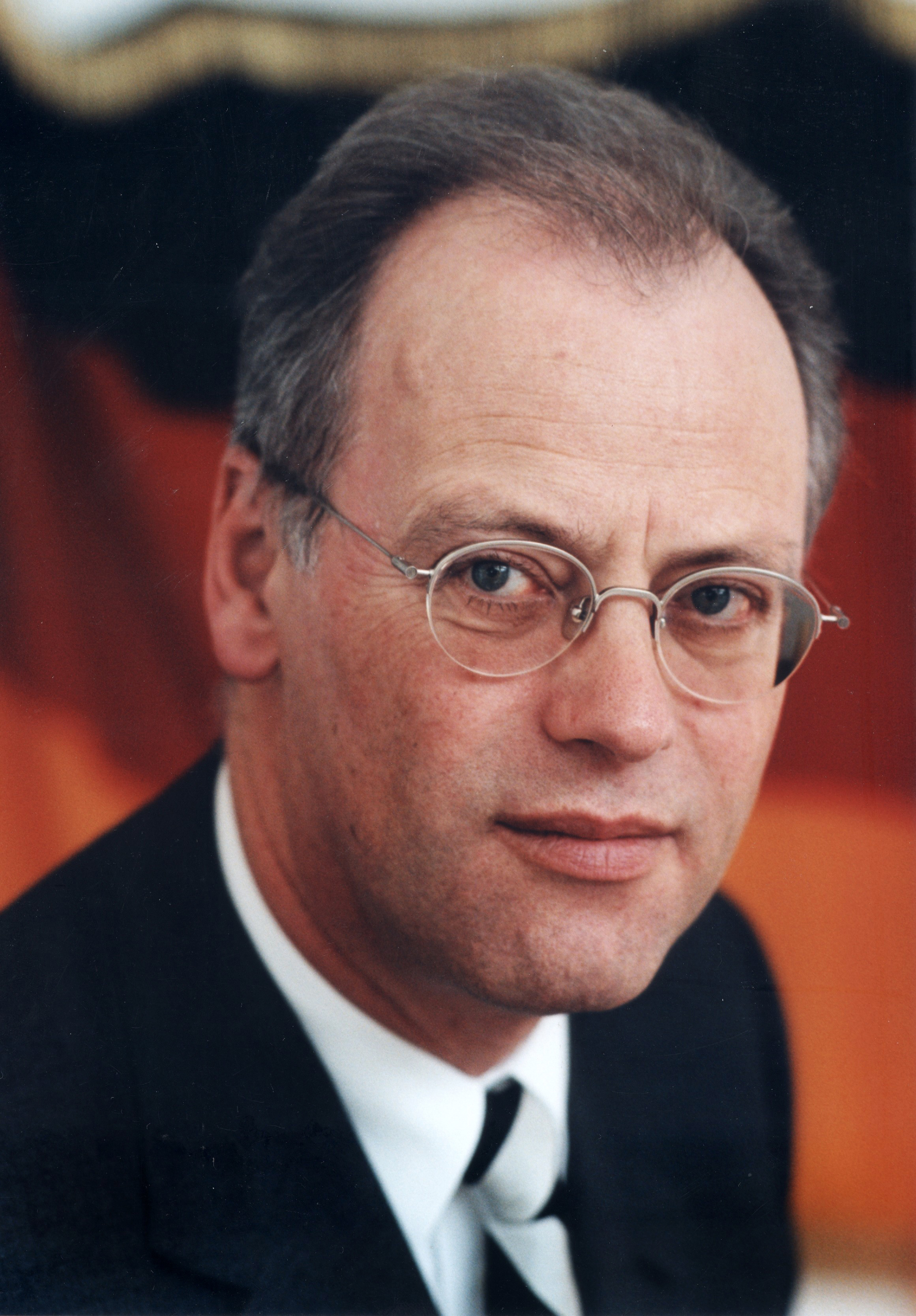

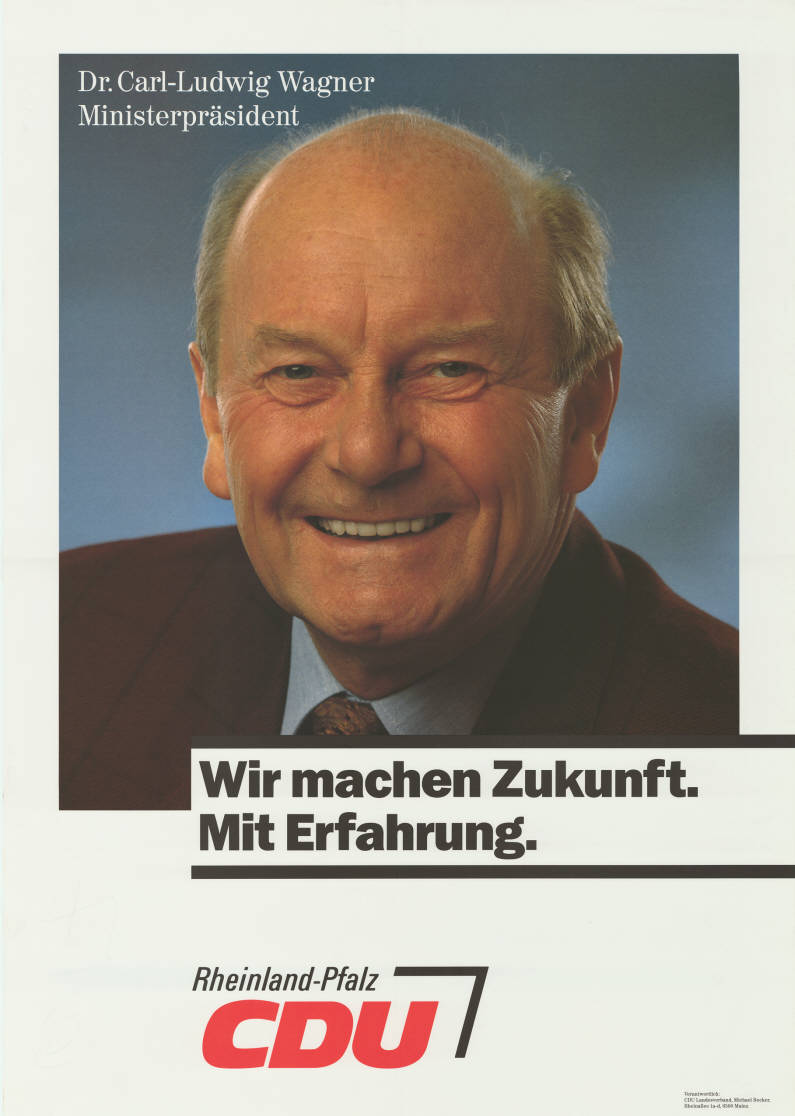
	First party	Second party
Leader	Rudolf Scharping	Carl-Ludwig Wagner
Party	SPD	CDU
Last election	40 seats, 38.8%	48 seats, 45.1%
Seats won	47	40
Seat change	▲7	▼8
Popular vote	951,695	822,449
Percentage	44.8%	38.7%
Swing	▲6.0%	▼6.4%
	Third party	Fourth party
Party	FDP	Greens
Last election	7 seats, 7.3%	5 seats, 5.9%
Seats won	7	7
Seat change	0	▲2
Popular vote	146,400	137,139
Percentage	6.9%	6.5%
Swing	▼0.4%	▲0.6%
- Results for the single-member constituencies
Minister-President before election
Carl-Ludwig Wagner
CDU
Elected Minister-President
Rudolf Scharping
SPD

The 1991 Rhineland-Palatinate state election in Germany was held on 21 April 1991 to elect the members of the Landtag of Rhineland-Palatinate. The incumbent coalition government of the Christian Democratic Union (CDU) and Free Democratic Party (FDP) led by Minister-President Carl-Ludwig Wagner was defeated, losing its majority. The Social Democratic Party (SPD) moved into first place, forming a coalition with the FDP. SPD leader Rudolf Scharping was subsequently elected as Minister-President.

This election marked several changes in the state history:

First, a change in the state election system. Previous elections were held purely proportionally, however, from that election on, the elections were held more in line with the federal mixed-member proportional representation, with both direct constituencies and proportional representation.

Secondly, from 1991 on, the Landtag became elected for five years instead of the previous four.

Thirdly, the election marked a shift in the state's political alignment: for 44 years (1947-1991) the state had been governed by CDU, with CDU coming first in every election. After this election, CDU would not come first nor partake in any state governments again before 2026.

== Parties ==
The table below lists parties represented in the previous Landtag of Rhineland-Palatinate.

Name		Ideology	Leader(s)	1987 result	
Name		Ideology	Leader(s)	Votes (%)	Seats
CDU	Christian Democratic Union of Germany; Christlich Demokratische Union Deutschlands	Christian democracy	Carl-Ludwig Wagner	45.1%	48 / 101
SPD	Social Democratic Party of Germany; Sozialdemokratische Partei Deutschlands	Social democracy	Rudolf Scharping	38.8%	40 / 101
FDP	Free Democratic Party; Freie Demokratische Partei	Classical liberalism		7.3%	7 / 101
Grüne	Alliance 90/The Greens; Bündnis 90/Die Grünen	Green politics		5.9%	5 / 101

== Election result ==
Summary of the 21 April 1991 election results for the Landtag of Rhineland-Palatinate
Party	Votes	%	+/-	Seats	+/-	Seats %
Social Democratic Party (SPD)	951,695	44.8	▲6.0	47	▲7	46.5
Christian Democratic Union (CDU)	822,449	38.7	▼6.4	40	▼8	39.6
Free Democratic Party (FDP)	146,400	6.9	▲0.4	7	0	6.9
Alliance 90/The Greens (Grüne)	137,139	6.5	▲0.6	7	▲2	6.9
The Republicans (REP)	43,380	2.0	▲2.0	0	±0	0
Others	24,244	1.1		0	±0	0
Total	2,125,407	100.0		101	▲1	
Voter turnout		73.9	▼3.1			

Popular Vote
SPD	44.78%
CDU	38.70%
FDP	6.89%
B'90/GRÜNE	6.45%
REP	2.05%
Other	1.14%

Landtag seats
SPD	46.53%
CDU	39.60%
FDP	6.93%
B'90/GRÜNE	6.93%
