= Jürgen Zöllner =

German politician

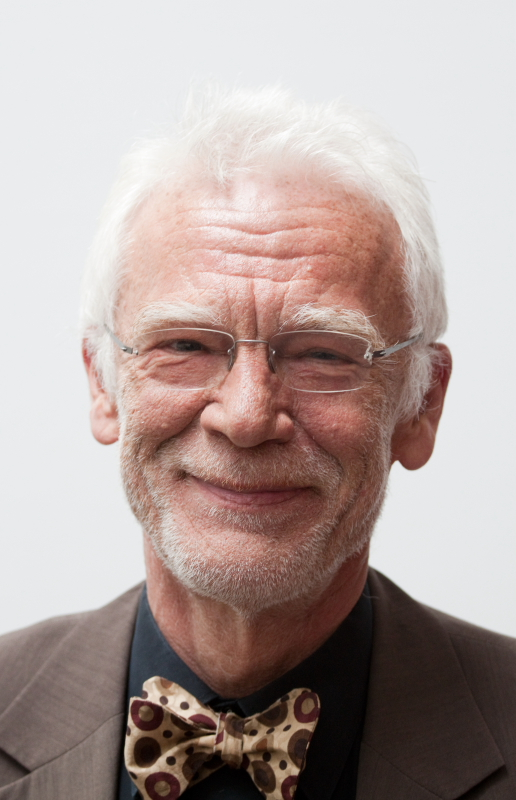
- Jürgen Zöllner in 2011

Personal details
- Born: July 11, 1945 (age 80) Mährisch Neustadt
- Party: SPD
- Occupation: Medical professional, Politician

Emil Jürgen Zöllner (July 11, 1945 in Mährisch Neustadt) is a German medical professional and politician (SPD). From 1991 to 2006, he served as Minister of Education and Science in Rhineland-Palatinate, and additionally as Deputy Minister-President from May to November 2006. During the 2006 to 2011 legislative period, he headed the Senate Department for Education, Youth, and Science of the Berlin Senate.

With more than 20 years of uninterrupted service as a minister, he was at one point the longest-serving minister in Germany. Till Backhaus currently holds this position.

== Early life and career ==
After graduating in 1964, Zöllner studied medicine until 1969 in Freiburg im Breisgau and Mainz, completed his doctorate in 1970, and obtained his habilitation in 1975. In 1977, Zöllner was a recipient of a DFG scholarship at the Beatson Institute for Cancer Research in Glasgow.

In 1977, Zöllner became a professor of Physiological chemistry at Johannes Gutenberg University Mainz. From 1983 to 1990, he served as its vice president, and Later, until 1991, as president. From 1991 to 2011, he held ministerial positions in state governments in Rhineland-Palatinate and Berlin. Since 2012, Zöllner has been working as a board member of the Charité Foundation.

== Politics ==
Zöllner has been a member of the SPD since 1972. On May 21, 1991, Rudolf Scharping, the then Minister-President of Rhineland-Palatinate, appointed him as Minister for Science and Continuing Education in his cabinet. In the following years, the structure of the ministries changed. Thus, in the Beck I cabinet from October 1994, Zöllner also took over the education portfolio. After another reorganization of the departments, in the Beck III cabinet from May 2001, Zöllner served as Minister for Science, Continuing Education, Research, and Culture in Rhineland-Palatinate. On May 18, 2006, Minister-President Kurt Beck appointed him as Deputy Minister-President of Rhineland-Palatinate.

From November 24, 2006, Zöllner served as Senator for Education, Science, and Research in Berlin.

=== Minister in Rhineland-Palatinate (1991–2006) ===
In 1997, Zöllner, with his legislative proposal for the University Medical Center Mainz, for the first time transformed a university clinic into a legal entity under public law; an example soon followed by other federal states. Also in 1997, he initiated an empirical shift in educational policy: as a minister and A-state coordinator in the KMK (Standing Conference of the Ministers of Education and Cultural Affairs of the Länder in the Federal Republic of Germany), Zöllner introduced the so-called "Konstanz Resolution" (October 24, 1997) to conduct cross-state comparative studies on the learning and performance levels of students. This marked a turning point: Since then, Germany has regularly participated in international comparative studies such as PISA, TIMSS, and IGLU.

== Awards ==
- 1994: Honorary Doctorate from the University of Burgundy
- 2003: Officer of the National Order of Meritorious
- 2006: Leibniz Medal from the Academy of Sciences and Literature Mainz
- 2009: Honorary Doctorate from Uni Mainz (honorary degree for research and teaching in University Medicine Mainz)
- 2012: Federal Cross of Merit, 1st Class
- 2020: Leibniz Medal from the Berlin-Brandenburg Academy of Sciences
