= 1983 Rhineland-Palatinate state election =

West German state election

- 6 March 1983

All 100 seats of the Landtag of Rhineland-Palatinate 51 seats needed for a majority
- Turnout: 90.4%
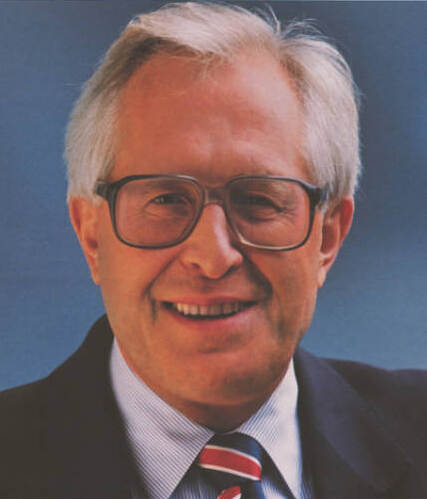

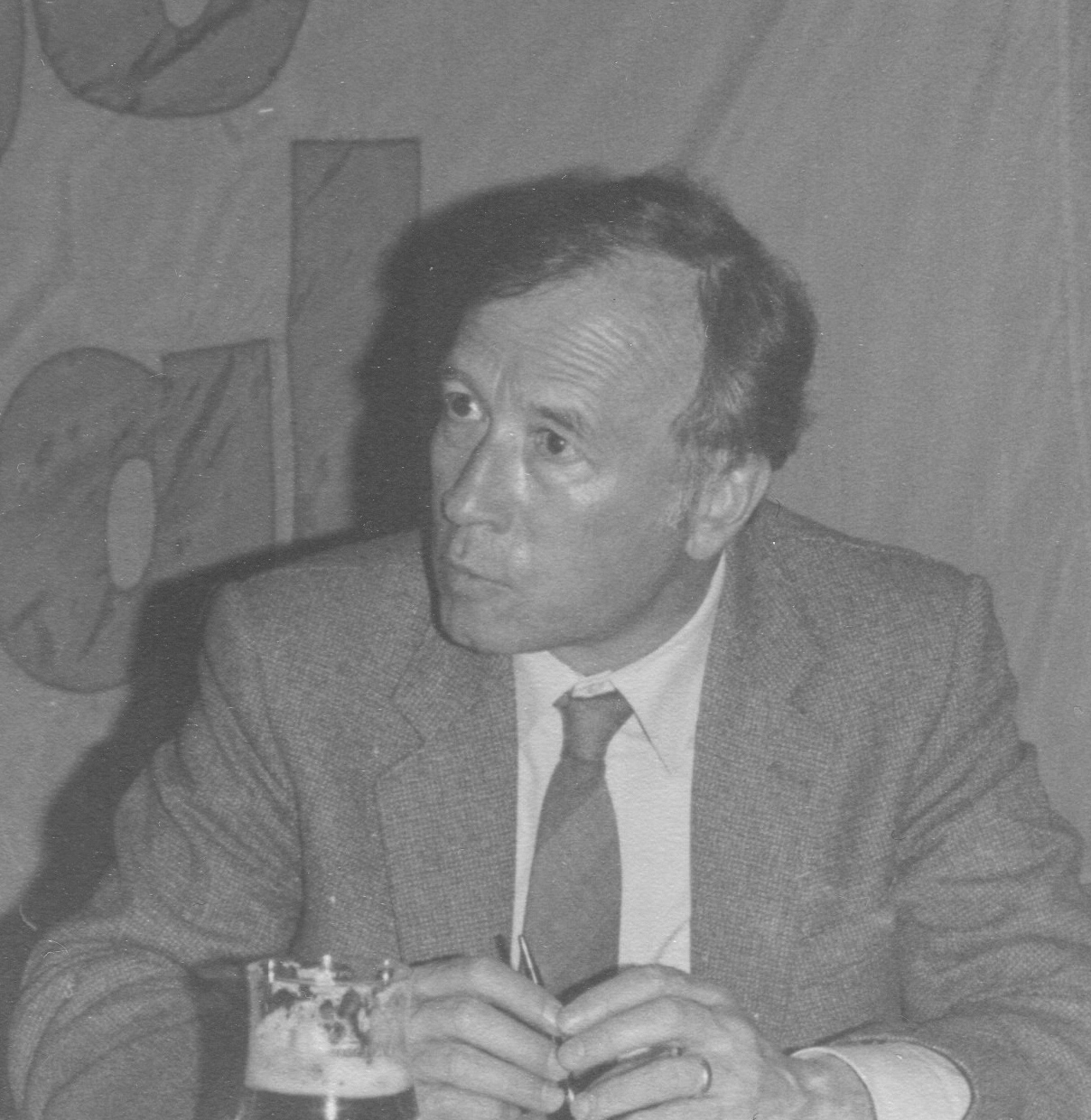
	First party	Second party
Leader	Bernhard Vogel	Hugo Brandt
Party	CDU	SPD
Last election	51 seats, 50.1%	43 seats, 42.3%
Seats won	57	43
Seat change	▲6	0
Popular vote	1,306,090	995,795
Percentage	51.9%	39.6%
Swing	▲1.8%	▼2.7%
	Third party	Fourth party
Leader		Hans-Günther Heinz
Party	Greens	FDP
Last election	Did not exist	6 seats, 6.4%
Seats won	0	0
Seat change	0	▼6
Popular vote	113,809	88,289
Percentage	4.5%	3.5%
Swing	New party	▼2.9%
Minister-President before election
Bernhard Vogel
CDU
Elected Minister-President
Bernhard Vogel
CDU

The 1983 Rhineland-Palatinate state election was conducted on 6 March 1983 to elect members to the Landtag, the state legislature of Rhineland-Palatinate, West Germany.

Summary of the 6 March 1983 Rhineland-Palatinate state Landtag election results
Party	Vote %	Vote % ±	Seats	Seats ±
Christian Democratic Union	51.9	+1.8	57	+6
Social Democratic Party	39.6	–2.7	43	±0
The Greens	4.5	N/A	0	N/A
Free Democratic Party	3.5	–2.9	0	–6
German Communist Party	0.2	–0.2	0	±0
National Democratic Party	0.1	–0.6	0	±0
Others	0.1	–0.4	0	±0
Total	100.0	—	100	±0
Source: parties-and-elections.de
