= 1987 Rhineland-Palatinate state election =

- 17 May 1987

All 100 seats of the Landtag of Rhineland-Palatinate 51 seats needed for a majority
- Turnout: 77.0% ▼17.4%
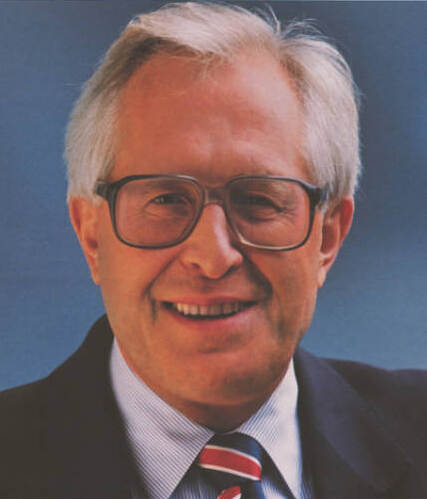

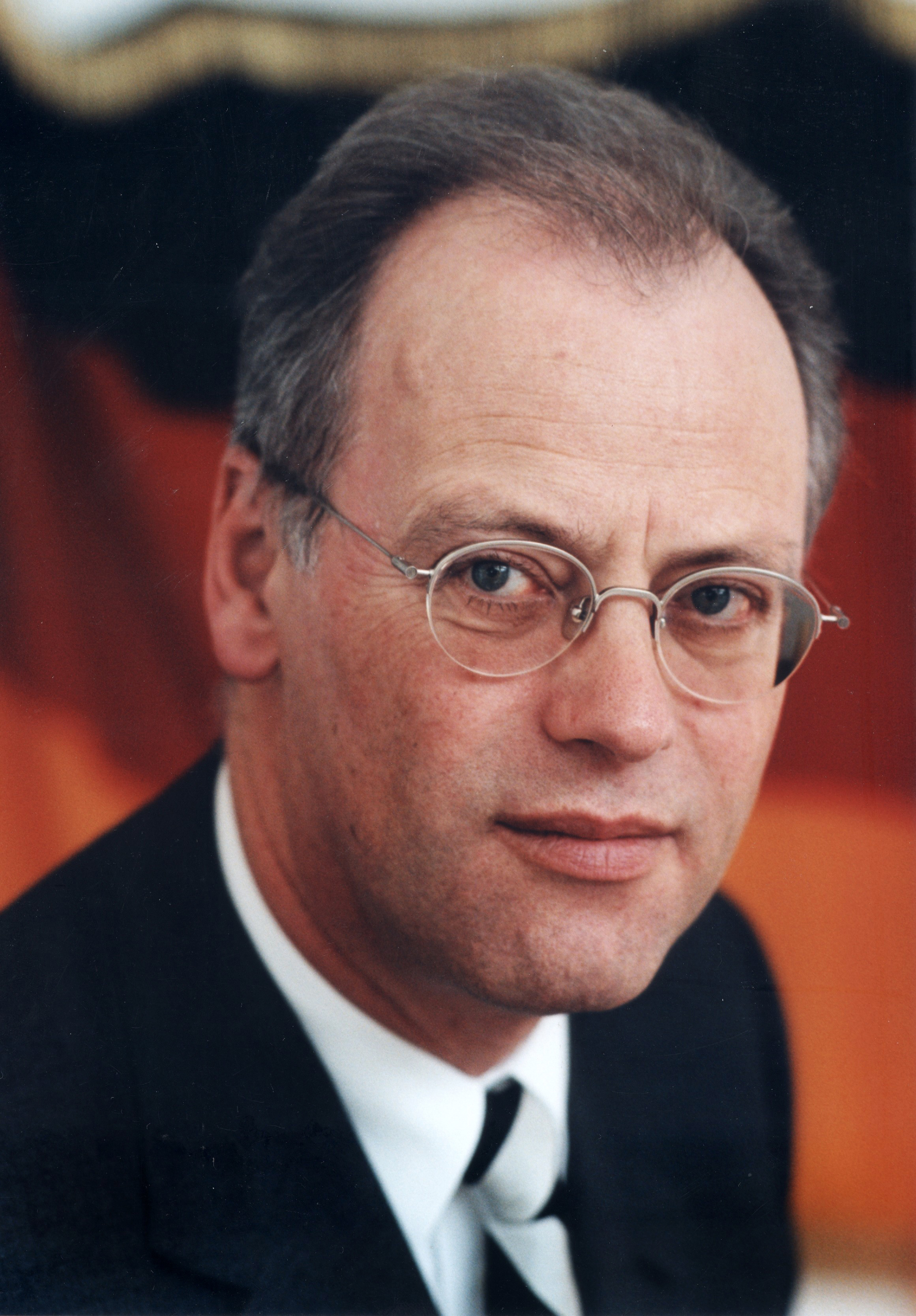

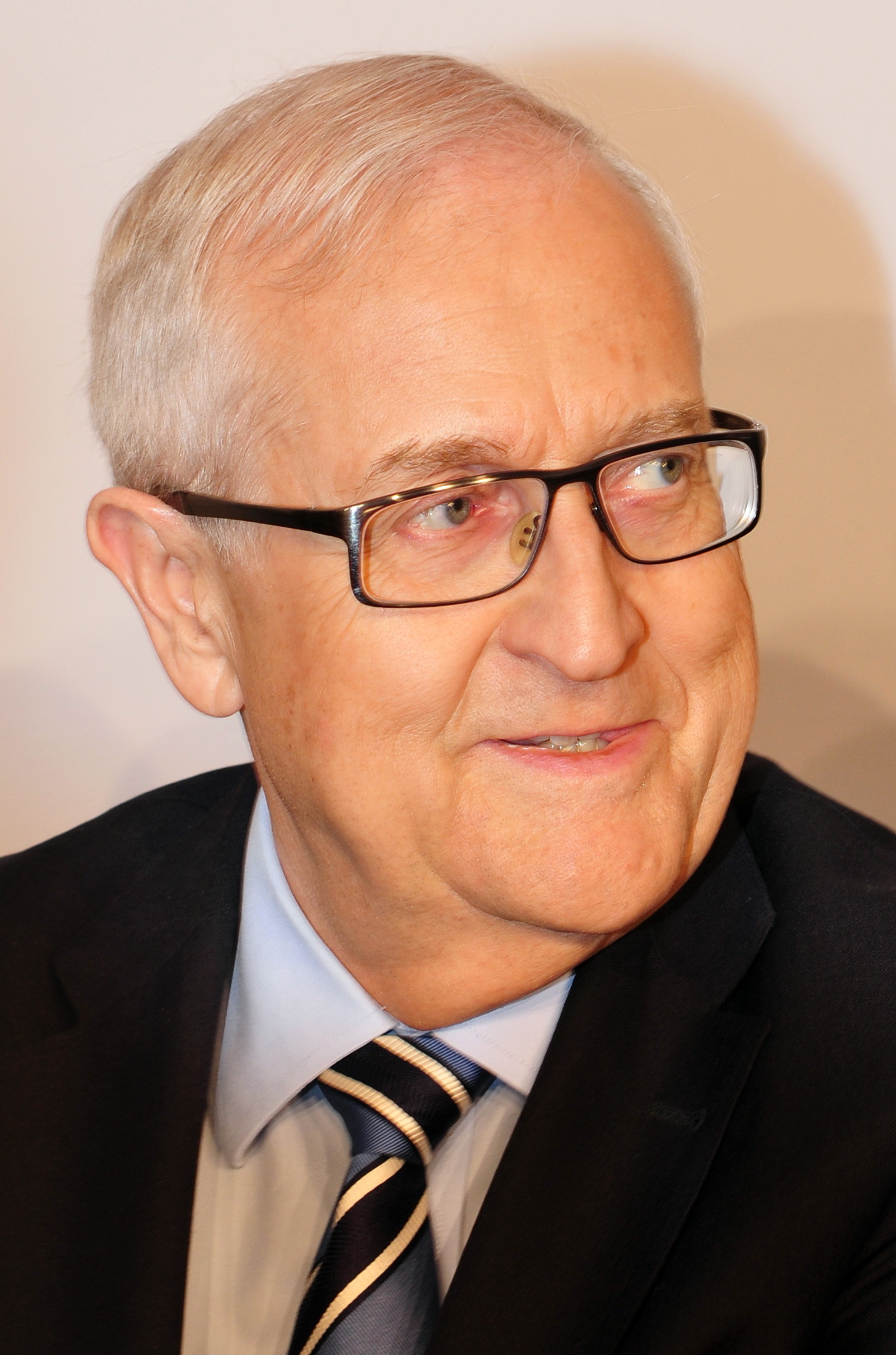
	First party	Second party
Leader	Bernhard Vogel	Rudolf Scharping
Party	CDU	SPD
Last election	57 seats, 51.9%	43 seats, 39.6%
Seats won	48	40
Seat change	▼9	▼3
Popular vote	981,412	844,241
Percentage	45.1%	38.8%
Swing	▼6.8%	▼0.6%
	Third party	Fourth party
Leader	Rainer Brüderle	Gisela Bill
Party	FDP	Greens
Last election	0 seats, 3.5%	0 seats, 4.5%
Seats won	7	5
Seat change	▲7	▲5
Popular vote	158,964	128,653
Percentage	7.3%	5.9%
Swing	▲3.8%	▲1.4%
Minister-President before election
Bernhard Vogel
CDU
Elected Minister-President
Bernhard Vogel
CDU

The 1987 Rhineland-Palatinate state election was conducted on 17 May 1987 to elect members to the Landtag, the state legislature of Rhineland-Palatinate, West Germany.

Summary of the 17 May 1987 Rhineland-Palatinate state Landtag election results
Party	Vote %	Vote % ±	Seats	Seats ±
Christian Democratic Union	45.1	–6.8	48	–9
Social Democratic Party	38.8	–0.8	40	–3
Free Democratic Party	7.3	+3.8	7	+7
The Greens	5.9	+1.4	5	+5
The Republicans	2.0	N/A	0	N/A
National Democratic Party	0.8	+0.7	0	±0
German Communist Party	0.1	–0.1	0	±0
Total	100.0	—	100	±0
Source: parties-and-elections.de
