= 1996 Rhineland-Palatinate state election =

German state election

- 24 March 1996

All 101 seats of the Landtag of Rhineland-Palatinate 51 seats needed for a majority
- Turnout: 2,064,726 (70.8%) ▼3.1%
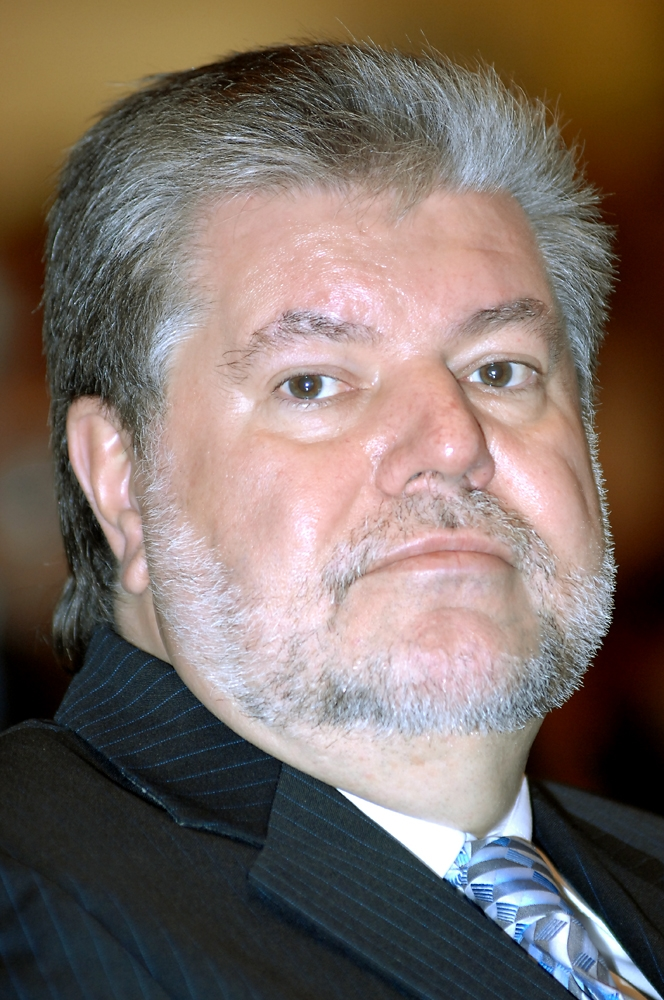
	First party	Second party
Leader	Kurt Beck	Johannes Gerster
Party	SPD	CDU
Last election	47 seats, 44.8%	40 seats, 38.7%
Seats won	43	41
Seat change	▼4	▲1
Popular vote	821,539	798,166
Percentage	39.8%	38.7%
Swing	▼5.0%	0.0%
	Third party	Fourth party
Party	FDP	Greens
Last election	7 seats, 6.9%	7 seats, 6.5%
Seats won	10	7
Seat change	▲3	0
Popular vote	184,426	142,665
Percentage	8.9%	6.9%
Swing	▲2.0%	▲0.4%
- Results for the single-member constituencies
Minister-President before election
Kurt Beck
SPD
Elected Minister-President
Kurt Beck
SPD

The 1996 Rhineland-Palatinate state election was held on 24 March 1996 to elect the members of the Landtag of Rhineland-Palatinate. The incumbent coalition government of the Social Democratic Party (SPD) and Free Democratic Party (FDP) led by Minister-President Kurt Beck retained its majority and continued in office.

== Parties ==
The table below lists parties represented in the previous Landtag of Rhineland-Palatinate.

Name		Ideology	Leader(s)	1991 result	
Name		Ideology	Leader(s)	Votes (%)	Seats
SPD	Social Democratic Party of Germany; Sozialdemokratische Partei Deutschlands	Social democracy	Kurt Beck	44.8%	47 / 101
CDU	Christian Democratic Union of Germany; Christlich Demokratische Union Deutschlands	Christian democracy	Johannes Gerster	38.7%	40 / 101
FDP	Free Democratic Party; Freie Demokratische Partei	Classical liberalism	Hans-Artur Bauckhage	6.9%	7 / 101
Grüne	Alliance 90/The Greens; Bündnis 90/Die Grünen	Green politics		6.5%	7 / 101

== Election result ==
Summary of the 24 March 1996 election results for the Landtag of Rhineland-Palatinate
Party	Votes	%	+/-	Seats	+/-	Seats %
Social Democratic Party (SPD)	821,539	39.8	▼5.0	43	▼4	42.6
Christian Democratic Union (CDU)	798,166	38.7	0.0	41	▲1	40.6
Free Democratic Party (FDP)	184,426	8.9	▲2.0	10	▲3	9.9
Alliance 90/The Greens (Grüne)	142,665	6.9	▲0.4	7	0	6.9
The Republicans (REP)	71,499	3.5	▲1.4	0	±0	0
Others	45,431	2.2		0	±0	0
Total	2,063,726	100.0		101	±0	
Voter turnout		70.8	▼3.1			

Popular Vote
SPD	39.81%
CDU	38.68%
FDP	8.94%
B'90/GRÜNE	6.91%
REP	3.46%
Other	2.20%

Landtag seats
SPD	42.57%
CDU	40.59%
FDP	9.90%
B'90/GRÜNE	6.93%
