= 1979 Rhineland-Palatinate state election =

West German state election

- 18 March 1979

All 100 seats of the Landtag of Rhineland-Palatinate 51 seats needed for a majority
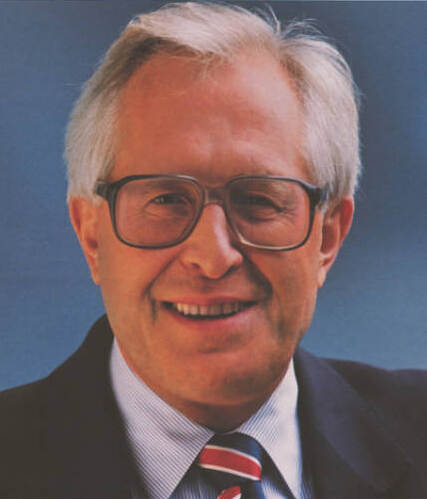

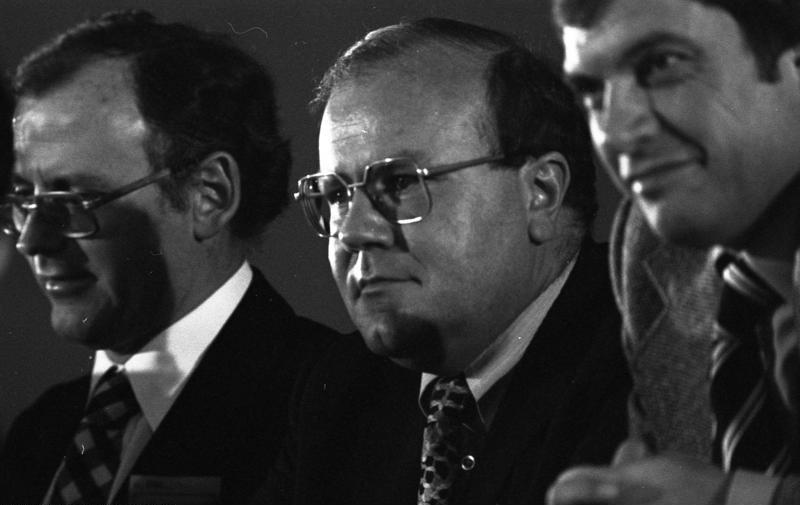
	First party	Second party	Third party
Leader	Bernhard Vogel	Hans Schweitzer	Hans-Otto Scholl
Party	CDU	SPD	FDP
Last election	55 seats, 53.9%	40 seats, 38.5%	5 seats, 5.6%
Seats won	51	43	6
Seat change	▼4	▲3	▲1
Popular vote	1,094,480	923,965	139,248
Percentage	50.1%	42.3%	6.4%
Swing	▼3.8%	▲3.8%	▲0.8%
Minister-President before election
Bernhard Vogel
CDU
Elected Minister-President
Bernhard Vogel
CDU

The 1979 Rhineland-Palatinate state election was conducted on 18 March 1979 to elect members to the Landtag, the state legislature of Rhineland-Palatinate, West Germany.

Summary of the 18 March 1979 Rhineland-Palatinate state Landtag election results
Party	Vote %	Vote % ±	Seats	Seats ±
Christian Democratic Union	50.1	–3.8	51	–4
Social Democratic Party	42.3	+3.8	43	+3
Free Democratic Party	6.4	+0.8	6	+1
National Democratic Party	0.7	–0.4	0	±0
German Communist Party	0.4	–0.1	0	±0
Others	0.5	+0.2	0	±0
Total	100.0	—	100	±0
Source: parties-and-elections.de Archived 3 October 2002 at the Wayback Machine
