= 1951 Rhineland-Palatinate state election =

West German state election

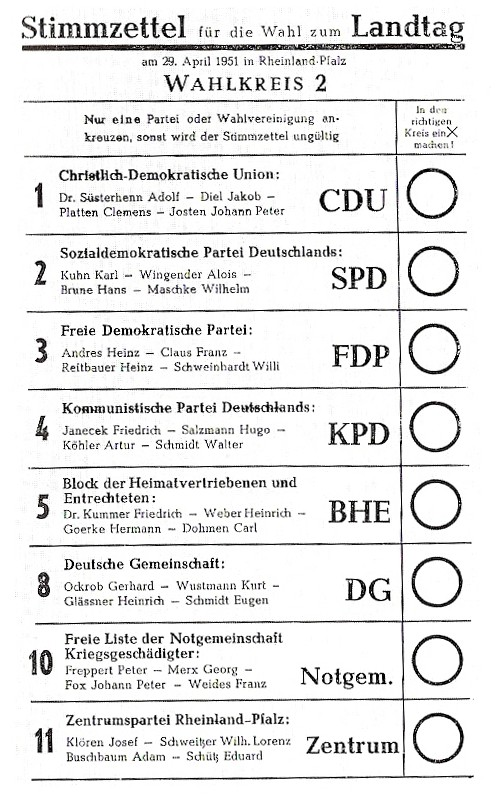
Ballot paper Rhineland-Palatinate state election, 1951

The 1951 Rhineland-Palatinate state election was conducted on 29 April 1951 to elect members to the Landtag, the state legislature of Rhineland-Palatinate, West Germany.

Ahead of the election, 7 December 1950 state electoral law divided the state into seven constituencies:

- Constituency One (Wahlkreis 1) encompassed the northern part of Koblenz administrative district around Koblenz and returned 18 members.
- Constituency Two (Wahlkreis 2) encompassed the southern part of Koblenz administrative district around Bad Kreuznach and returned 12 members.
- Constituency Three (Wahlkreis 3) encompassed the whole Trier administrative district and returned 14 members.
- Constituency Four (Wahlkreis 4) encompassed the whole Montabaur administrative district and returned 8 members.
- Constituency Five (Wahlkreis 5) encompassed the whole Rheinhessen administrative district and returned 13 members.
- Constituency Six (Wahlkreis 6) encompassed the eastern part of Pfalz administrative district around Ludwigshafen and returned 19 members.
- Constituency Seven (Wahlkreis 7) encompassed the western part of Pfalz administrative district around Kaiserslautern and returned 16 members.

Summary of the 29 April 1951 Rhineland-Palatinate state Landtag election results
Party	Vote %	Vote % ±	Seats	Seats ±
Christian Democratic Union	39.2	–8.0	43	–5
Social Democratic Party	34.0	–0.3	38	+4
Free Democratic Party	16.9	+7.1	19	+8
Communist Party of Germany	4.3	–4.4	0	–8
Deutsche Reichspartei	0.5	N/A	0	N/A
Others	5.3	N/A	0	N/A
Total	100.0	—	100	–1
Source: parties-and-elections.de
