= 1963 Rhineland-Palatinate state election =

West German state election

The 1963 Rhineland-Palatinate state election was conducted on 31 March 1963 to elect members to the Landtag, the state legislature of Rhineland-Palatinate, West Germany.

Summary of the 31 March 1963 Rhineland-Palatinate state Landtag election results
Party	Vote %	Vote % ±	Seats	Seats ±
Christian Democratic Union	44.4	–4.0	46	–6
Social Democratic Party	40.7	+5.8	43	+6
Free Democratic Party	10.1	+0.4	11	+1
Deutsche Reichspartei	3.2	–1.9	0	–1
Others	1.5	–0.4	0	±0
Total	100.0	—	100	±0
Source: parties-and-elections.de
