= 2001 Rhineland-Palatinate state election =

German state election

- 25 March 2001

All 101 seats of the Landtag of Rhineland-Palatinate 51 seats needed for a majority
- Turnout: 1,833,846 (62.2%) ▼8.6%
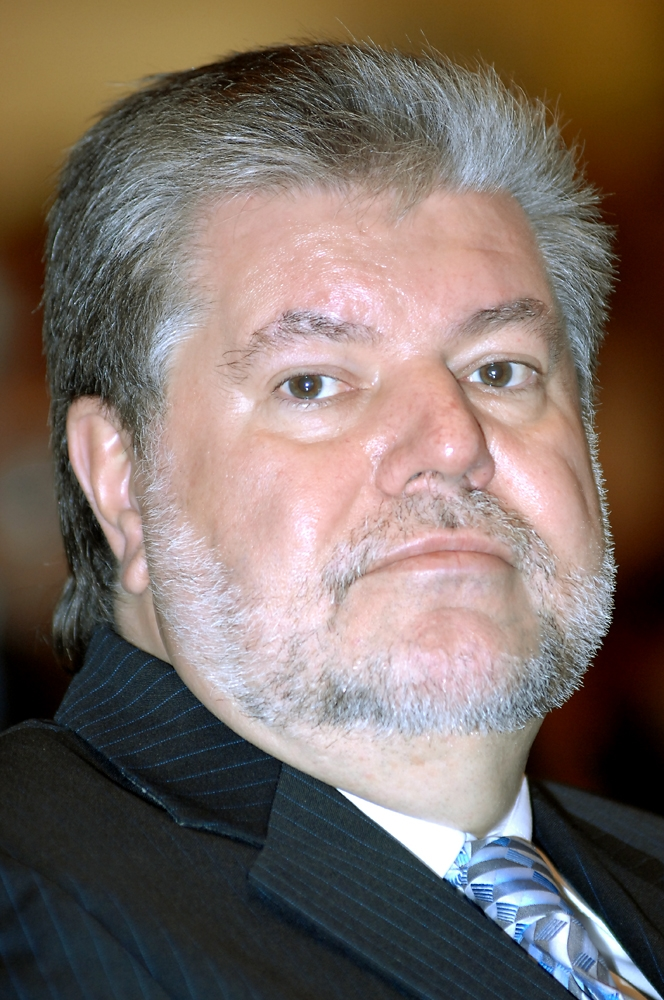

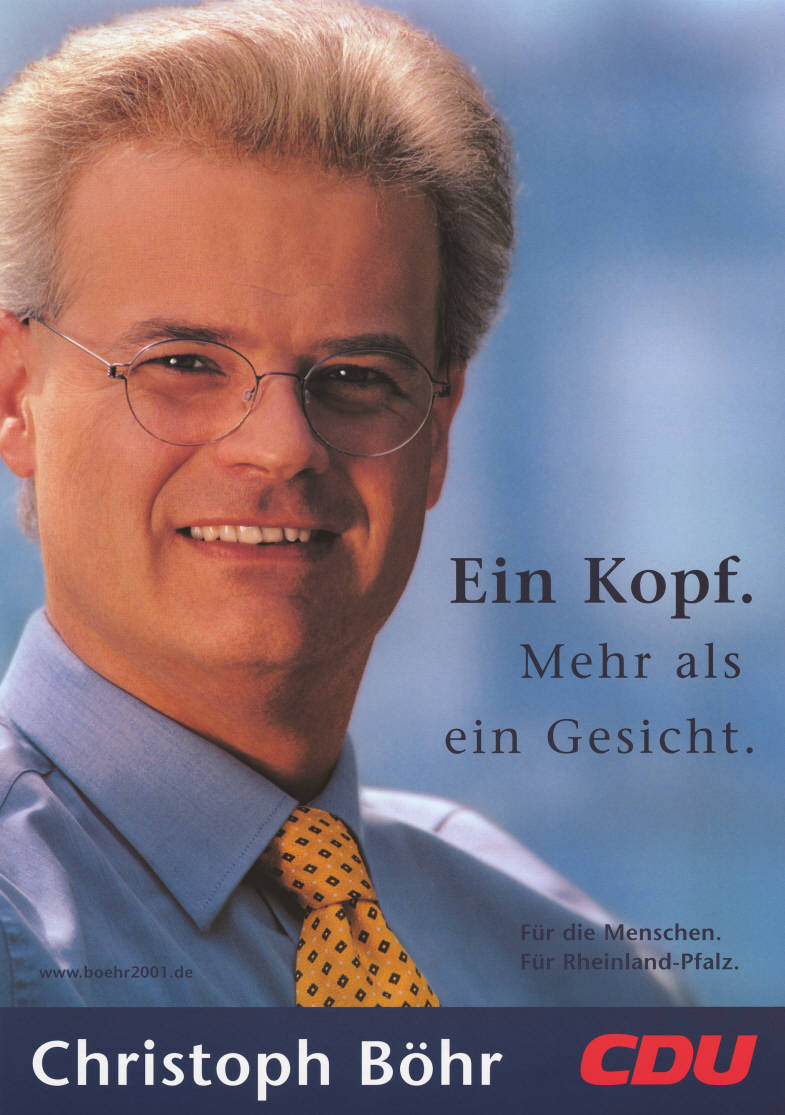
	First party	Second party
Leader	Kurt Beck	Christoph Böhr
Party	SPD	CDU
Last election	43 seats, 39.8%	41 seats, 38.7%
Seats won	49	38
Seat change	▲6	▼3
Popular vote	820,610	647,238
Percentage	44.7%	35.3%
Swing	▲5.0%	▼3.4%
	Third party	Fourth party
Leader	Hans-Artur Bauckhage
Party	FDP	Greens
Last election	10 seats, 8.9%	7 seats, 6.9%
Seats won	8	6
Seat change	▼2	▼1
Popular vote	143,427	95,567
Percentage	7.8%	5.2%
Swing	▼1.1%	▼1.7%
- Results for the single-member constituencies
Minister-President before election
Kurt Beck
SPD
Elected Minister-President
Kurt Beck
SPD

The 2001 Rhineland-Palatinate state election was held on 25 March 2001 to elect the members of the Landtag of Rhineland-Palatinate. The incumbent coalition government of the Social Democratic Party (SPD) and Free Democratic Party (FDP) led by Minister-President Kurt Beck retained its majority and continued in office.

== Parties ==
The table below lists parties represented in the previous Landtag of Rhineland-Palatinate.

Name		Ideology	Leader(s)	1996 result	
Name		Ideology	Leader(s)	Votes (%)	Seats
SPD	Social Democratic Party of Germany; Sozialdemokratische Partei Deutschlands	Social democracy	Kurt Beck	39.8%	43 / 101
CDU	Christian Democratic Union of Germany; Christlich Demokratische Union Deutschlands	Christian democracy	Christoph Böhr	38.7%	41 / 101
FDP	Free Democratic Party; Freie Demokratische Partei	Classical liberalism	Hans-Artur Bauckhage	8.9%	10 / 101
Grüne	Alliance 90/The Greens; Bündnis 90/Die Grünen	Green politics		6.9%	7 / 101

== Opinion polling ==
Polling firm	Fieldwork date	Sample size	SPD	CDU	FDP	Grüne	Others	Lead
2001 state election	25 Mar 2001	–	44.8	35.3	7.8	5.2	6.9	9.5
Infratest dimap	9–14 Mar 2001	1,000	43	35	9	6	7	8
Forschungsgruppe Wahlen	5–8 Mar 2001	1,010	44	36	8	6	6	8
Infratest dimap	19–24 Feb 2001	1,000	44	39	7	5	5	5
Psephos	9–12 Feb 2001	1,004	41	37	9	7	6	4
Forsa	1 Feb 2001	?	40	37	11	8	4	3
polis	4 Jan 2001	?	42	39	7	5	7	3
Infratest dimap	20–25 Nov 2000	1,000	43	40	7	5	5	3
Psephos	Oct 2000	1,006	41	38	9	6	?	3
Infratest dimap	18–23 Sep 2000	1,000	40	43	7	5	5	3
Psephos	3–7 Aug 2000	1,002	42	36	10	6	?	6
Infratest dimap	19–24 Jun 2000	1,000	41	40	10	6	3	1
Psephos	16–20 May 2000	1,002	40	39	10	6	5	1
Infratest dimap	13–19 Mar 2000	1,000	43	36	10	6	5	7
Infratest dimap	Dec 1999	?	36	43	8	6	7	7
Infratest dimap	Sep 1999	?	37	44	8	6	?	7
Infratest dimap	Jul 1999	1,003	37	44	7	7	?	7
Infratest dimap	Mar 1999	?	40	39	10	6	5	1
Infratest dimap	Dec 1998	?	43	36	8	7	?	7
Infratest dimap	Jun 1998	1,002	44	34	9	6	?	10
Infratest dimap	Mar 1998	?	46	33	8	6	?	13
Infratest dimap	Dec 1997	1,002	41	36	8	8	?	5
Infratest dimap	Sep 1997	?	42	35	8	8	?	7
1996 state election	24 Mar 1996	–	39.8	38.7	8.9	6.9	5.7	1.1

== Election result ==
Summary of the 25 March 2001 election results for the Landtag of Rhineland-Palatinate
Party	Votes	%	+/-	Seats	+/-	Seats %
Social Democratic Party (SPD)	820,610	44.8	▲5.0	49	▲6	48.5
Christian Democratic Union (CDU)	647,238	35.3	▼3.4	38	▼3	37.6
Free Democratic Party (FDP)	143,427	7.8	▼1.1	8	▼2	7.9
Alliance 90/The Greens (Grüne)	95,567	5.2	▼1.7	6	▼1	5.9
Free Voters (FW)	46,549	2.5	▲2.5	0	±0	0
The Republicans (REP)	44,586	2.4	▼1.1	0	±0	0
Others	35,869	2.0		0	±0	0
Total	1,833,846	100.0		101	±0	
Voter turnout		62.2	▼8.6			

Popular Vote
SPD	44.75%
CDU	35.29%
FDP	7.82%
B'90/GRÜNE	5.21%
Other	6.93%

Landtag seats
SPD	48.51%
CDU	37.62%
FDP	7.92%
B'90/GRÜNE	5.94%

== Sources ==
- The Federal Returning Officer
