= Kurt Beck =

German politician (born 1949)

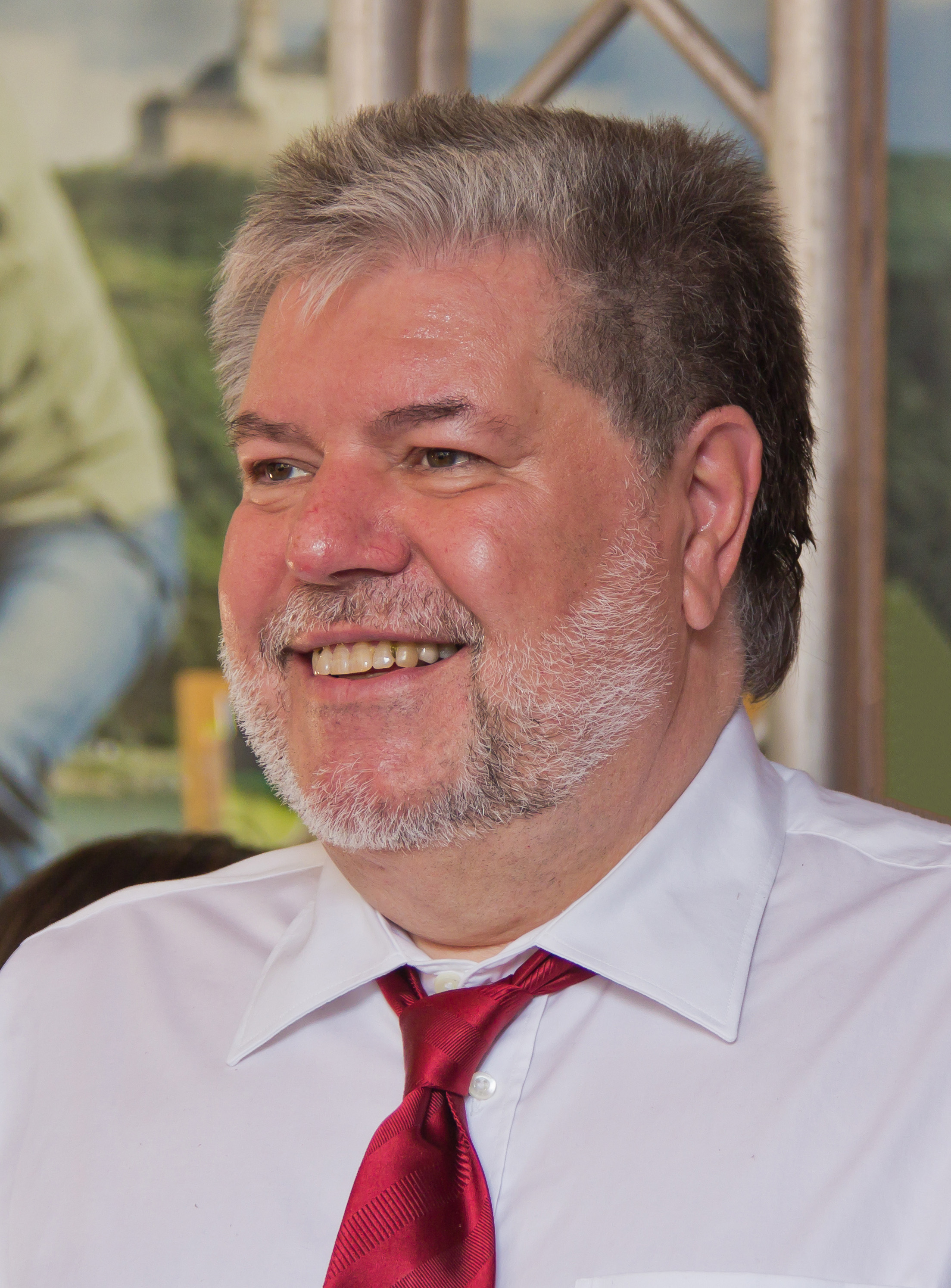
- Beck in 2011

Leader of the Social Democratic Party
- In office 10 April 2006 – 7 September 2008
- General Secretary: Hubertus Heil
- Deputy: Frank-Walter Steinmeier; Andrea Nahles; Peer Steinbrück; Bärbel Dieckmann
- Preceded by: Matthias Platzeck
- Succeeded by: Frank-Walter Steinmeier (acting)

Minister-President of Rhineland-Palatinate
- In office 26 October 1994 – 15 January 2013
- Deputy: Rainer Brüderle; Peter Caesar; Hans-Artur Bauckhage; Jürgen Zöllner; Karl Peter Bruch; Eveline Lemke
- Preceded by: Rudolf Scharping
- Succeeded by: Malu Dreyer

President of the Bundesrat
- In office 1 November 2000 – 31 October 2001
- First Vice President: Kurt Biedenkopf
- Preceded by: Kurt Biedenkopf
- Succeeded by: Klaus Wowereit
Parliamentary constituencies
Member of the Landtag of Rhineland-Palatinate
In office 21 May 1991 – 5 February 2013
Preceded by	Constituency established
Succeeded by	Alexander Schweitzer
Constituency	Südliche Weinstraße
In office 18 May 1979 – 21 May 1991
Preceded by	multi-member district
Succeeded by	Constituency abolished
Constituency	Wahlkreis 4

Personal details
- Born: 5 February 1949 (age 77) Bad Bergzabern, Rhineland-Palatinate, Germany
- Party: Social Democratic Party (1972–)
- Occupation: Politician; Radio Engineer; Consultant

Kurt Beck (born 5 February 1949) is a German politician of the Social Democratic Party (SPD), who served as the 7th Minister President of Rhineland-Palatinate from 1994 to 2013 and as the 55th President of the Bundesrat in 2000–01. In May 2006, he succeeded Matthias Platzeck as chairman of the German Social Democratic Party (SPD). He resigned from that post in September 2008.

On 28 September 2012, Beck announced his resignation from the post of minister-president. He was succeeded by social minister Malu Dreyer.

Following Peter Struck's death in 2012, Beck – together with Dieter Schulte – became the chair of the Friedrich Ebert Foundation; he served until 2020, when he was replaced with Martin Schulz.

== Early life and career ==
Beck was born in Bad Bergzabern, Rhineland-Palatinate, to the bricklayer Oskar Beck and his wife Johanna. Both his parents had their roots in the town Kapsweyer in southern Rhenish Palatinate. He grew up in Steinfeld.

From 1963 to 1968, Beck became an electrician. After military duty in 1968 and 1969, he graduated from an evening school in 1972. Since then, he served as an employee representative on works councils.

== Political career ==
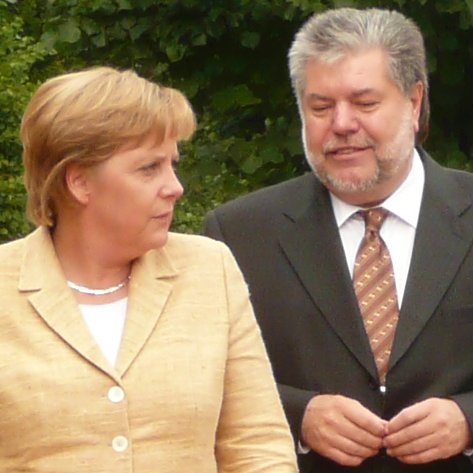
Angela Merkel and Beck in 2007

After joining the SPD in 1972, mainly because of the Party's programme as well as the personality of Willy Brandt, Beck became chairman of the SPD of Rhineland Palatinate in 1993 and deputy chairman of the federal party in 2003. He served in this function until 14 May 2006.

Beck has been active in local affairs since 1974, when he was first elected a member of the Kreistag. From 1989 to 1994, he was mayor of his hometown Steinfeld. From 1979, he was a directly elected member of the Landtag of Rhineland-Palatinate, in which he served as the speaker for social affairs of the Parliamentary group of the SPD (from 1982 to 1985) and as a member of the governing body of the group from 1985 to 1991, when he was elected chairman.

=== Minister-President of Rhineland-Palatinate, 1994–2013 ===
On 26 October 1994, Beck was elected Minister President of Rhineland-Palatinate, succeeding Rudolf Scharping. He was re-elected three times, in 1996, 2001 and 2006. As Minister President he was known for his centrist approach, which is also apparent from the choice of his coalition partner (the liberal FDP instead of the centre-left Green Party, with which the SPD has recently allied itself). In this respect, he follows the policy of Scharping. In March 2006, Beck's SPD gained an absolute majority in the state elections; Beck offered to continue the coalition but since the FDP declined, the SPD formed a government without a partner. After Edmund Stoiber resigned in 2007, Beck was the senior Minister President in Germany.

During his time in office, Beck's decisions in Rhineland-Palatinate to increase efficiency in the state government via administrative reorganisation, and to introduce full-day schooling and free kindergartens, drew national attention. The state also emerged as one of the country’s top economic performers. When the United States Armed Forces closed dozens of camps and barracks with the loss of 100,000 jobs, Beck's government invested heavily in retraining schemes, creating 40,000 new jobs.

In 2000 and 2001, Beck was President of the Bundesrat, one of his duties as Minister President.

In September 2012, Beck announced his resignation. He had been under pressure for weeks over the bankruptcy of the Nürburgring motorsports complex in Rhineland-Palatinate, one of the world's most famous race tracks.

=== Chairman of the SPD, 2006–2008 ===
When Matthias Platzeck had to resign for medical reasons in 2006, Beck was officially elected as chairman of the SPD with the approval of 95% of the delegates. He became the party’s fourth chairman in seven years.

Beck decided not to join the cabinet and succeed Vice-Chancellor Franz Müntefering because it would have prevented him from criticizing Chancellor Angela Merkel's coalition government. According to public opinion polls during his time as party chairman, his possibilities of becoming Chancellor, if he had run for this office in the 2009 election, had been very limited. According to Süddeutsche Zeitung, only 16% of Germans would have elected him in the hypothetical case of a direct vote against Angela Merkel.

During his time in office as party leader, Beck most notably negotiated an agreement with Merkel’s Christian Democrats in April 2017 on a partial privatization of national railway Deutsche Bahn's passenger and freight divisions. Meanwhile, Beck's decision in early 2008 to allow regional cooperation with the left-wing populist Left Party in western German state parliaments caused a rift within his party and triggered a slump in opinion poll ratings for the SPD and him personally.

On 7 September 2008, Beck resigned as chairman at a party meeting in Werder, Brandenburg and Frank-Walter Steinmeier was chosen as the SPD candidate for Chancellor in the 2009 election, while Franz Müntefering replaced Beck as chairman after an interim of Steinmeier. At the time, he said that he was a victim of intrigue inside the SPD.

== Life after politics ==
In March 2017, Beck was appointed the government's official commissioner for the victims of the attack at the Christmas market at Berlin's Breitscheidplatz on 19 December 2016. Later that year, together with German Justice Minister Heiko Maas, he presented his final report.

== Controversies ==
=== Henrico Frank ===
Near the end of 2006, Beck told to Henrico Frank, an unemployed builder from Wiesbaden, If he would wash and shave himself, he could get a job within three weeks. Beck's behaviour was critizised by social Partys, FDP and CDU. According to the promise of Kurt Beck Frank appears washed, shaved and with a normal hairstyle at the state chamber. He declined the jobs as parcel deliverer, recycler and cleaning boy, offered to him by Kurt Beck personally. Later he got trouble, because he was seen in a T-Shirt with the Slogan " work is shit". He was forced to make efforts to find a job, and finally found one as a punk rock expert for iMusic TV.

=== Afghanistan ===
In April 2007, Beck proposed a peace conference in Afghanistan with the inclusion of "moderate Taliban". The Foreign Minister of Afghanistan, Rangin Dadfar Spanta, thus accused him of being naïve. He compared the idea of "moderate Taliban" to distinguishing between moderate and radical right-wing extremists in Rhineland-Palatinate. The German public mostly ignored the affair.

== Other activities ==
=== Corporate boards ===
- Boehringer Ingelheim, Member of the Advisory Board (since 2013)

=== Non-profit organizations ===
- Stiftung Hambacher Schloss, Chair of the Advisory Board (since 2020)
- European Foundation for the Speyer Cathedral, Chairman of the Board of Trustees
- Denkwerk Demokratie, Member of the Advisory Board
- Fritz Walter Foundation, Chair of the Advisory Board
- Stefan Morsch Foundation, Member of the Board of Trustees (since 2013)
- Stiftung Institut für Herzinfarktforschung (IHF), Member of the Board of Trustees
- Stiftung Tausendgut, Member of the Board of Trustees

== Honours and awards ==
1983: Grand Cross Special Class of the Order of Merit of the Federal Republic of Germany
2001: Grand Cross of the Order of the Star of Romania
2004 Grand Cross of Merit of the Federal Republic of Germany
Grand Officer of the Legion of Honour
Grand Cross of the Order Pro Merito Melitensi of the Sovereign Military Order of Malta
Commander of the Ordre des Arts et des Lettres of the French Republic
1997: Honorary Master of the Palatine Crafts
2005: Business Award of the Union of medium-sized enterprises
Order of Merit of the Senate of the Republic of Chile
Honorary Citizen of Opole, Poland
Honorary doctorate from Francis Marion University (USA)
Honorary Citizen of the southern Chinese province of Fujian
Commandeur of the wine fraternity Chevaliers du Tastevin, France

== Personal life ==
Beck is Catholic. He lives with his wife, Roswitha, whom he married in 1968 in Steinfeld, Rhineland-Palatinate. They have one son (Stefan Beck).

Political offices
Preceded by Rudolf Scharping	Minister-President of Rhineland-Palatinate; 1994–2013	Succeeded by Malu Dreyer
Party political offices
Preceded by Matthias Platzeck	Chairman of the Social Democratic Party of Germany; 2006–2008	Succeeded by Frank-Walter Steinmeier (interim)
