= 1975 Rhineland-Palatinate state election =

West German state election

- 9 March 1975

All 100 seats of the Landtag of Rhineland-Palatinate 51 seats needed for a majority
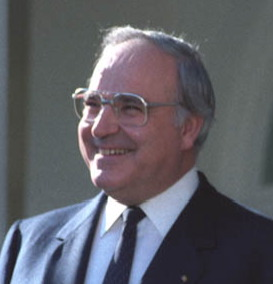

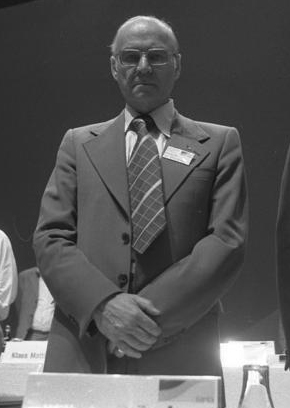

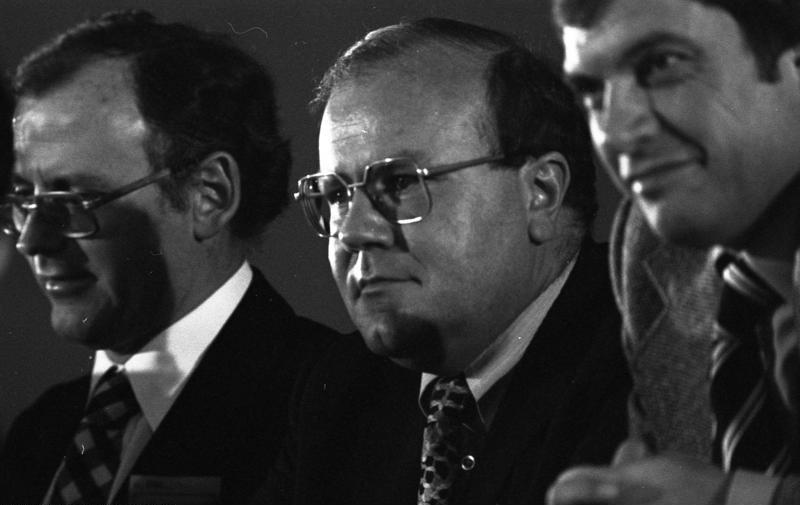
	First party	Second party	Third party
Leader	Helmut Kohl	Wilhelm Dröscher	Hans-Otto Scholl
Party	CDU	SPD	FDP
Last election	53 seats, 50.0%	44 seats, 40.5%	3 seats, 5.9%
Seats won	55	40	5
Seat change	▲2	▼4	▲2
Popular vote	1,143,360	817,018	118,762
Percentage	53.9%	38.5%	5.6%
Swing	▲3.9%	▼2.0%	▼0.3%
Minister-President before election
Helmut Kohl
CDU
Elected Minister-President
Helmut Kohl
CDU

The 1975 Rhineland-Palatinate state election was conducted on 9 March 1975 to elect members to the Landtag, the state legislature of Rhineland-Palatinate, West Germany.

Ahead of this election, the state electoral reform on 4 July 1972 reduced the constituencies from six to four:

- Constituency One (Wahlkreis 1) was centered around Koblenz and elected 26 members.
- Constituency Two (Wahlkreis 2) was centered around Trier and elected 24 members.
- Constituency Three (Wahlkreis 3) was centered around Mainz and Ludwigshafen and elected 24 members.
- Constituency Four (Wahlkreis 4) was centered around Kaiserslautern and elected 26 members.

The seats would be allocated with d'Hondt method.

Summary of the 9 March 1975 Rhineland-Palatinate state Landtag election results
Party	Vote #	Vote %	Vote % ±	Seats	Seats ±
Christian Democratic Union	1,143,360	53.9	+3.9	55	+2
Social Democratic Party	817,018	38.5	–2.0	40	–4
Free Democratic Party	118,762	5.6	–0.3	5	+2
National Democratic Party	22,942	1.1	–1.6	0	±0
German Communist Party	11,101	0.5	–0.4	0	±0
Others	7,298	0.3	N/A	0	N/A
Total	2,120,481	100.0	—	100	±0
Source: parties-and-elections.de
