= 1959 Rhineland-Palatinate state election =

West German state election

The 1959 Rhineland-Palatinate state election was conducted on 19 April 1959 to elect members to the Landtag, the state legislature of Rhineland-Palatinate, West Germany.

In this election, far-right Deutsche Reichspartei (DRP) crossed the 5% electoral threshold and was thus able to send one deputy to the Landtag - Hans Schikora (1912-2005). The reason for this was the winegrowers' (Rhineland-Palatinate is Germany's most important winegrowing region) concerns that the European Economic Community (EEC) would intensify competition with better and cheaper French wines, thus threatening their livelihoods. Thus the DRP's protectionist propaganda resonated with the winegrowers, as did stirring up the anti-French sentiment with the slogan "Out with all the occupiers" ("Raus mit allen Besatzern") (Rhineland-Palatinate was formed out of the French occupation zone). However, the lone Schikora was quickly isolated by the other parties. After DRP members in the neighboring state of NRW defaced the Cologne synagogue with swastikas on Christmas Eve 1959, the Rhineland-Palatinate interior ministry banned DRP on 26 January 1960, so Schikora (who was also expelled from the national party) continued to sit in the Landtag as an unaffiliated member until the next elections.

Summary of the 19 April 1959 Rhineland-Palatinate state Landtag election results
Party	Vote %	Vote % ±	Seats	Seats ±
Christian Democratic Union	48.4	+1.6	52	+1
Social Democratic Party	34.9	+3.2	37	+1
Free Democratic Party	9.7	–3.0	10	–3
Deutsche Reichspartei	5.1	N/A	1	N/A
Others	1.9	–3.7	0	±0
Total	100.0	—	100	±0
Source: parties-and-elections.de
