= 1947 Rhineland-Palatinate state election =

West German state election

The 1947 Rhineland-Palatinate state election was conducted on 18 May 1947 to elect members to the Landtag, the state legislature of Rhineland-Palatinate, Allied-occupied Germany.

For this election, the administrative districts (Regierungsbezirk) served as constituencies, with Koblenz district electing 31, Montabaur 8, Rheinhessen 13, Trier 13 and Pfalz 35 members.

Summary of the 18 May 1947 Rhineland-Palatinate state Landtag election results
| Party | Vote % | Seats |
|---|---|---|
| Christian Democratic Union | 47.2 | 48 |
| Social Democratic Party | 34.3 | 34 |
| Free Democratic Party | 9.8 | 11 |
| Communist Party of Germany | 8.7 | 8 |
| Total | 100.0 | 101 |
Source: parties-and-elections.de
