= 1955 Rhineland-Palatinate state election =

West German state election

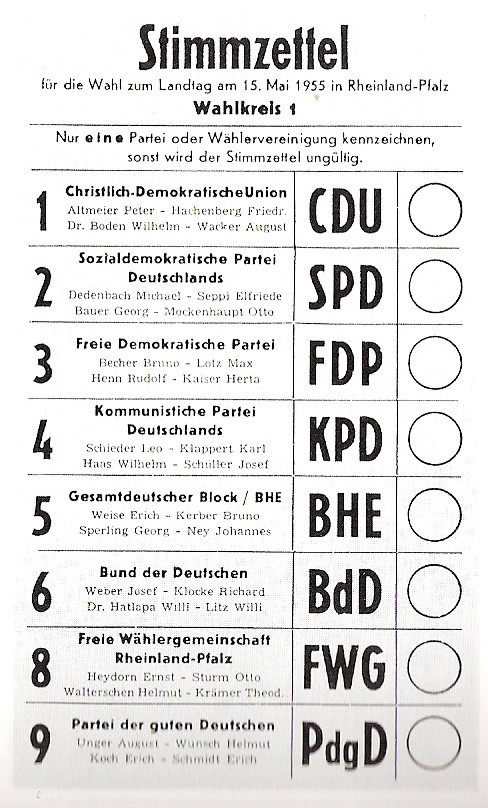
Ballot Paper

The 1955 Rhineland-Palatinate state election was conducted on 15 May 1955 to elect members to the Landtag, the state legislature of Rhineland-Palatinate, West Germany.

Summary of the 15 May 1955 Rhineland-Palatinate state Landtag election results
Party	Vote %	Vote % ±	Seats	Seats ±
Christian Democratic Union	46.8	+7.6	51	+8
Social Democratic Party	31.7	–2.3	36	–2
Free Democratic Party	12.7	–4.2	13	–6
Communist Party of Germany	3.2	–1.1	0	±0
Others	5.6	+0.3	0	±0
Total	100.0	—	100	±0
Source: parties-and-elections.de
