= 1967 Rhineland-Palatinate state election =

West German state election

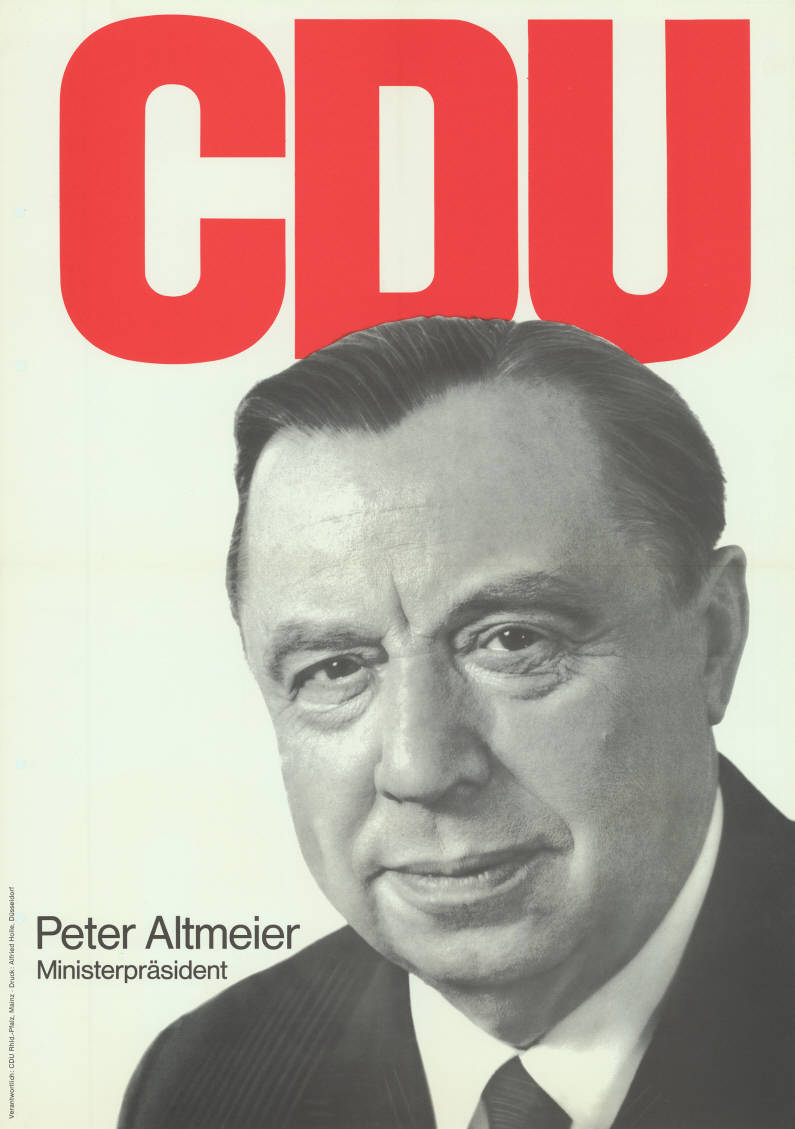
Election poster of the CDU with Peter Altmeier

The 1967 Rhineland-Palatinate state election was conducted on 23 April 1967 to elect members to the Landtag, the state legislature of Rhineland-Palatinate, West Germany.

Summary of the 23 April 1967 Rhineland-Palatinate state Landtag election results
Party	Vote %	Vote % ±	Seats	Seats ±
Christian Democratic Union	46.7	+2.3	49	+3
Social Democratic Party	36.8	–3.9	39	–4
Free Democratic Party	8.3	–1.8	8	–3
National Democratic Party	6.9	N/A	4	N/A
Others	1.2	–0.3	0	±0
Total	100.0	—	100	±0
Source: parties-and-elections.de
