= 1971 Rhineland-Palatinate state election =

West German state election

The 1971 Rhineland-Palatinate state election was conducted on 21 March 1971 to elect members to the Landtag, the state legislature of Rhineland-Palatinate, West Germany.

This election was the only one held with six constituencies under the 7 July 1970 state electoral law:

- Constituency One (Wahlkreis 1) centered around Neuwied elected 15 members.
- Constituency Two (Wahlkreis 2) centered around Koblenz, elected 22 members.
- Constituency Three (Wahlkreis 3) centered around Trier elected 15 members.
- Constituency Four (Wahlkreis 4) centered around Mainz elected 14 members.
- Constituency Five (Wahlkreis 5) centered around Ludwigshafen elected 21 members.
- Constituency Six (Wahlkreis 6) centered around Kaiserslautern elected 15 members.

All seats would be distributed via Hare method.

Summary of the 21 March 1971 Rhineland-Palatinate state Landtag election results
Party	Vote %	Vote % ±	Seats	Seats ±
Christian Democratic Union	50.0	+3.3	53	+4
Social Democratic Party	40.5	+3.7	44	+5
Free Democratic Party	5.9	–2.4	3	–5
National Democratic Party	2.7	–4.2	0	–4
German Communist Party	0.9	N/A	0	N/A
Total	100.0	—	100	±0
Source: parties-and-elections.de
