= Carl-Ludwig Wagner =

German politician (1930–2012)

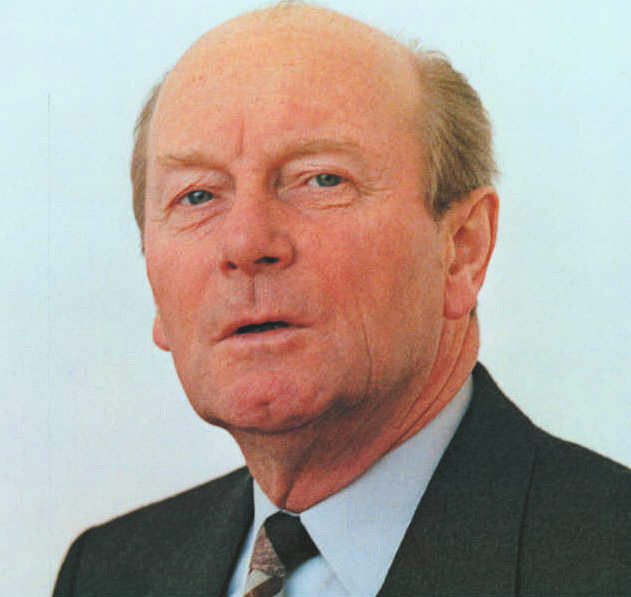

Minister-President of Rhineland-Palatinate
- In office 8 December 1988 – 21 May 1991
- President: Richard von Weizsäcker
- Chancellor: Helmut Kohl
- Deputy: Rainer Brüderle
- Preceded by: Bernhard Vogel
- Succeeded by: Rudolf Scharping

Member of the Bundestag
- In office 20 October 1969 – 8 April 1976

Personal details
- Born: 9 January 1930 Düsseldorf, Germany
- Died: 27 July 2012 (aged 82) Trier, Germany
- Party: CDU

Carl-Ludwig Wagner (9 January 1930 – 27 July 2012) was a German politician of the Christian Democratic Union (CDU).

Wagner was born in Düsseldorf, but later lived in Eitelsbach, a part of Trier. After his Abitur 1949 in Trier he studied law at the University of Mainz and one year in Montpellier. He got his doctorate in 1961.

Wagner was the 5th Minister President of Rhineland-Palatinate from 1988 to 1991, Minister from 1979 to 1988 (law, finances), a member of the Bundestag (1969–1976) and worked for the European Parliament in Luxembourg from 1959 to 1969.
