= Rudolf Scharping =

German lawyer and politician (born 1947)

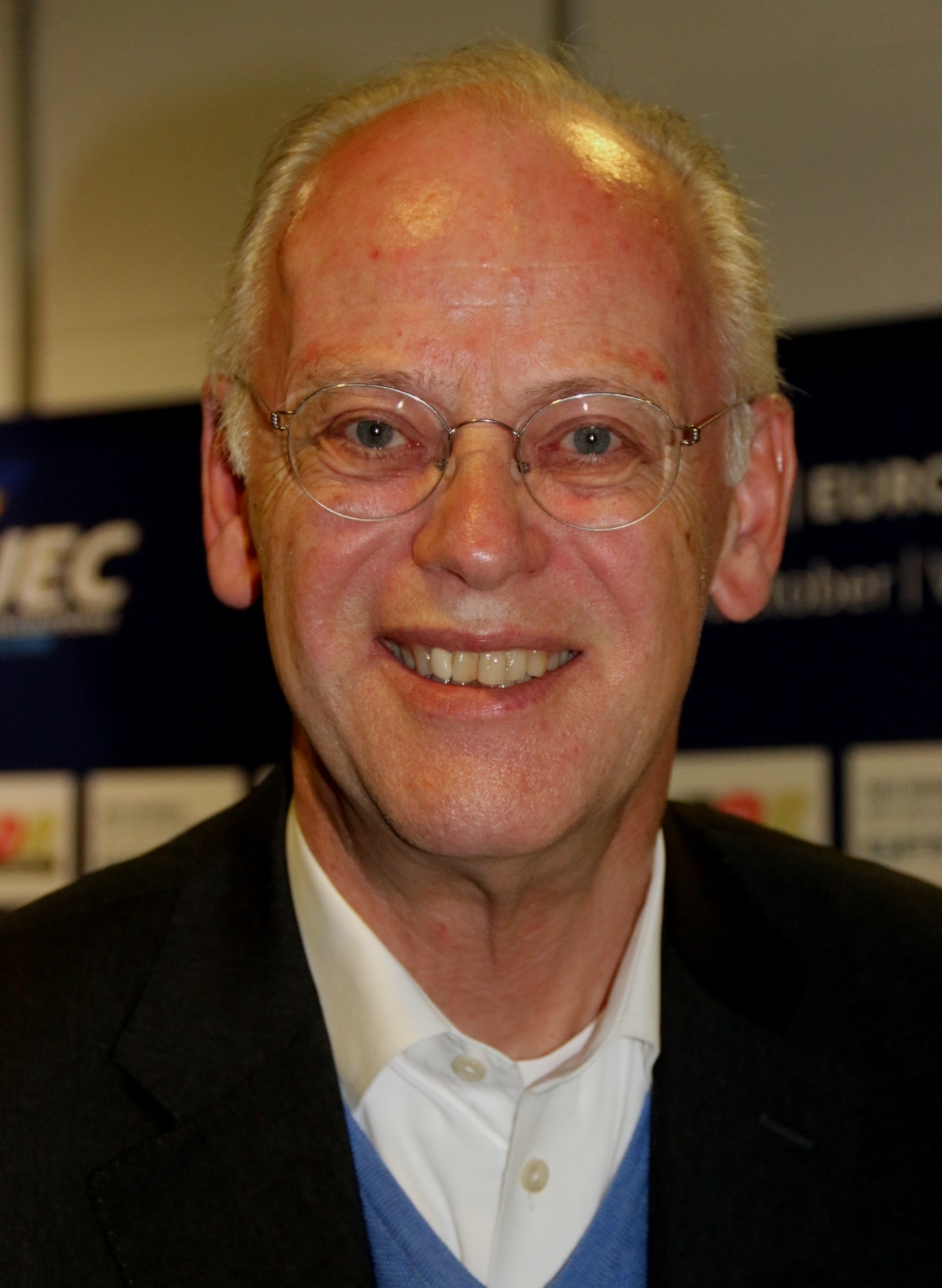

Federal Minister of Defence
- In office 27 October 1998 – 18 July 2002
- President: Roman Herzog; Johannes Rau
- Chancellor: Gerhard Schröder
- Preceded by: Volker Rühe
- Succeeded by: Peter Struck

Leader of the Social Democratic Party in the Bundestag
- In office 10 November 1994 – 26 October 1998
- Preceded by: Hans-Ulrich Klose
- Succeeded by: Peter Struck

Leader of the Social Democratic Party
- In office 25 June 1993 – 18 November 1995
- Preceded by: Björn Engholm
- Succeeded by: Oskar Lafontaine

Minister President of Rhineland-Palatinate
- In office 21 May 1991 – 15 October 1994
- Deputy: Rainer Brüderle
- Preceded by: Carl-Ludwig Wagner
- Succeeded by: Kurt Beck

Leader of the Social Democratic Party in Rhineland-Palatinate
- In office 1985–1993
- Preceded by: Hugo Brandt
- Succeeded by: Kurt Beck

Leader of the Social Democratic Party in the Landtag of Rhineland-Palatinate
- In office 19 June 1985 – 21 May 1991
- Preceded by: Hugo Brandt
- Succeeded by: Kurt Beck

Member of the Bundestag for Rhineland-Palatinate
- In office 10 November 1994 – 18 October 2005

Member of the Landtag of Rhineland-Palatinate
- In office 1975–1994

Personal details
- Born: Rudolf Albert Scharping; 2 December 1947 (age 78) Niederelbert, Allied-occupied Germany
- Party: Social Democratic Party (1966–present)
- Education: University of Bonn

Rudolf Albert Scharping (born 2 December 1947) is a German lawyer and politician of the Social Democratic Party (SPD).

He first rose to prominence as Minister President of Rhineland-Palatinate (1991–1994). He was his party's federal chairman from 1993 to 1995 and in 1994 ran an effort, ultimately unsuccessful, to oust Chancellor Helmut Kohl in the federal elections. In 1998, he became Defence Minister in the government of Chancellor Gerhard Schröder but resigned shortly before the 2002 elections.

From March 1995 to May 2001, he served as chairman of the Party of European Socialists (PES).

== Early life and education ==
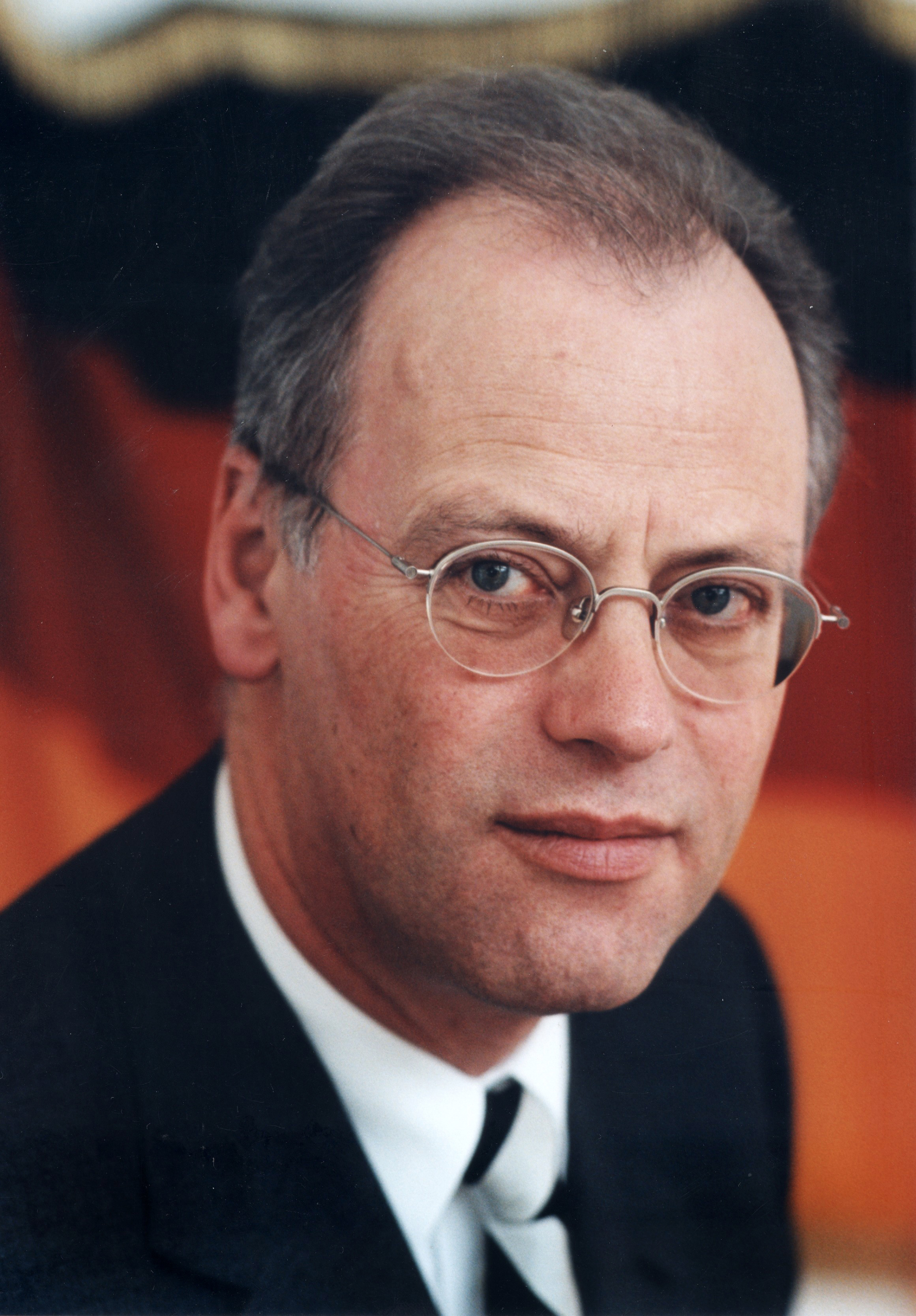
Scharping circa 2000

Scharping was born in Niederelbert. He studied politics, sociology and law at the University of Bonn. His master's thesis was on Social Democratic campaign techniques in Rhineland-Palatinate.

== Political career ==
=== State politics ===
Scharping joined the Social Democratic Party of Germany (SPD) in 1966. In 1968, he was expelled from the party for taking part in an antimilitary protest against a fund-raising concert for the German military band. However, after a year, he rejoined the party.

He was a member of the Landtag of Rhineland-Palatinate from 1975 to 1994. In 1985, he became his party's chairman in the state and in 1991, the young, full-bearded man led his party to a surprise victory over the Christian Democrats, which had dominated state politics until then. Forming a coalition with the Free Democratic Party, Scharping was elected Minister-President on 21 May 1991 – an office he would hold until 15 October 1994.

=== Federal party chairman ===
In 1993, following the resignation of Björn Engholm, the SPD was in need of a new party chairman that would lead them into the federal elections approaching next year. Scharping's success in turning in winning and governing a hitherto-CDU state, made him a candidate for that office. In a party-internal vote, Scharping won against Gerhard Schröder, the centrist Minister-President of Lower Saxony, and Heidemarie Wieczorek-Zeul, a representative of the party's left wing. At the time, he was the youngest leader in party history.

In the 1994 elections, Scharping ran as the SPD's candidate for Chancellor. As part of his campaign, he included his long-term rivals Gerhard Schröder and Oskar Lafontaine in his shadow cabinet. He made social justice the centerpiece of his campaign. Throughout the campaign, he refused to commit to a coalition partner. While the environmentalist Alliance 90/The Greens were widely seen as his party's most likely partner, he himself had governed Rhineland-Palatinate in a coalition with the Free Democrats. Sharping promised that he would move into federal politics, even if he lost the election.

Scharping's opponent in the elections was the CDU's Helmut Kohl, who then had been Chancellor for twelve years, had forged German reunification in 1990 but whose popularity had taken hits due to ailing economic recovery in East Germany. By March 1994, the much younger Scharping held a 15-point lead over Kohl in the polls but eventually Kohl won the election, despite a decreased share in the vote.

True to his promise, Sharping resigned as Minister-President – his successor was Kurt Beck – and became leader of the opposition in Bonn. In his capacity as chairman of the SPD parliamentary group, he also served on the Committee on the Election of Judges (Wahlausschuss), which is in charge of appointing judges to the Federal Constitutional Court.

As chairman of the SPD, Scharping spoke out against the Euro that would leave Germany with a currency weaker than the Deutsche Mark.

As leader of the opposition, Sharping was increasingly faced with criticism within his own party. While he preferred a centrist course aiming at capitalising on mistakes made by the Christian Democrats, more left-wing members and others sought a more confrontative approach, dubbing Scharping's line a Schmusekurs (cuddling course). After the SPD did not perform well in several state elections, Scharping was ousted from the party leadership at the 1995 federal party conference at Mannheim, Oskar Lafontaine, the Saarland's more left-leaning Minister-President (and himself a former, failed candidate for chancellor) addressed the party members in a rousing speech, to which Scharping's reflective mode seemed dry and boring. The next, Lafontaine defeated Scharping in an upset vote. Scharping, however, was elected as one of five vice-chairmen and retained that office in 1997, 1999 and 2001. Scharping also visually marked this defeat by shaving off his full beard.

=== Minister of Defence, 1998–2002 ===
From 27 October 1998 to 18 July 2002, Scharping served as Germany's Minister of Defence in the government of Chancellor Gerhard Schröder. His tenure saw the first time that the German Bundeswehr fully participated in a war, as NATO bombed Yugoslavia to stop alleged Serbian policies in the Kosovo region. This involvement proved very controversial among the German population, especially among the environmentalist and pacifist Alliance 90/The Greens, that were part of Schröder's cabinet. Scharping defended the bombing of Yugoslavia in reference to Operation Horseshoe, which later turned out to have likely been a hoax.

In 1999, Scharping established a government-appointed independent commission headed by former President Richard von Weizsäcker to develop recommendations on the reform of the Bundeswehr.

By July 1999, Scharping was widely considered the leading candidate to become the new Secretary General of NATO; however, he declined that position.

During a visit to United States Secretary of Defense William Cohen in 2000, Scharping was injured and briefly hospitalized after a steel security barrier sprang up beneath his motorcade as it arrived for an honors ceremony at the Pentagon.

In 2001, Scharping was criticized publicly by Defense Secretary Donald H. Rumsfeld when he was found to be the source of a report that the United States would intervene in Somalia as part of the campaign against terrorism.

== Resignation ==
In what was later called Majorca Affair, Scharping had his picture taken in the swimming pool in company of his girlfriend Kristina Countess Pilati while the Bundeswehr was about to begin a difficult mission in North Macedonia. He subsequently faced an investigation in parliament in over claims that he improperly used military planes to visit Pilati in Majorca and in Frankfurt.

Ahead of the 2002 elections, Schröder dismissed Scharping after weekly magazine Stern reported that he had accepted some $71,000 from a Frankfurt public relations company in 1998 and 1999, while he was minister.

Following his dismissal as Minister of Defense, Scharping withdrew his candidacy for reelection as vice chairman as his chances were meagre. His successor as vice chairman was again Kurt Beck. He kept his Bundestag seat but did not run again in the 2005 elections. For the remainder of his term, he served on the Committee on Foreign Affairs.

== Life after politics ==
Since leaving politics, Scharping established his own company with a focus on business development in China. Scharping is a passionate cyclist; in 2005, he became the chairman of the Bund Deutscher Radfahrer. In addition, he took on a variety of paid and unpaid positions, including as member of the board of trustees at the Bonner Akademie für Forschung und Lehre praktischer Politik (BAPP). He is a Senior Network Member at the European Leadership Network (ELN).

Political offices
Preceded by Carl-Ludwig Wagner	Minister-President of Rhineland-Palatinate; 1991–1994	Succeeded by Kurt Beck
Preceded by Volker Rühe	Federal Minister of Defence (Germany); 1998–2002	Succeeded by Peter Struck
Party political offices
Preceded by Björn Engholm	Chairman of the Social Democratic Party of Germany; 1993–1995	Succeeded by Oskar Lafontaine
