= Bernhard Vogel =

German politician (1932–2025)

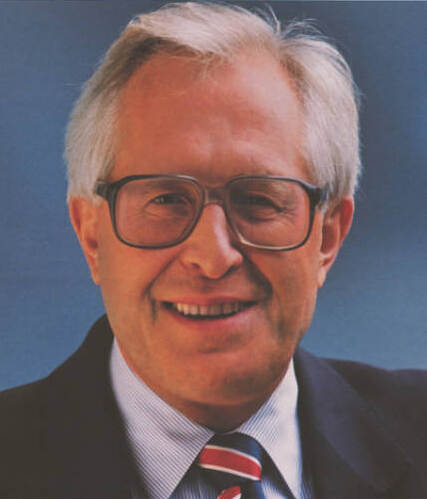
- Vogel in 1994

Minister-President of Thuringia
- In office 5 February 1992 – 5 June 2003
- Deputy: Ulrich Fickel; Gerd Schuchardt; Andreas Trautvetter
- Preceded by: Josef Duchač
- Succeeded by: Dieter Althaus

President of the Bundesrat
- In office 1 November 1987 – 31 October 1988
- First Vice President: Walter Wallmann
- Preceded by: Walter Wallmann
- Succeeded by: Björn Engholm
- In office 3 December 1976 – 31 October 1977
- First Vice President: Albert Osswald
- Preceded by: Albert Osswald
- Succeeded by: Gerhard Stoltenberg

Minister-President of Rhineland-Palatinate
- In office 2 December 1976 – 8 December 1988
- Deputy: Otto Meyer; Carl-Ludwig Wagner
- Preceded by: Helmut Kohl
- Succeeded by: Carl-Ludwig Wagner

Minister for Education and Culture of Rhineland-Palatinate
- In office 18 May 1967 – 2 December 1976
- Minister-President: Peter Altmeier; Helmut Kohl
- Preceded by: Eduard Orth
- Succeeded by: Hanna-Renate Laurien
Parliamentary constituencies
Member of the Landtag of Thuringia for Erfurt II
In office 10 November 1994 – 8 July 2004
| Preceded by | Norbert Otto |
| Succeeded by | Michael Panse |
Member of the Landtag of Rhineland-Palatinate for Wahlkreis 3 (Wahlkreis 5; 1971–1975)
In office 29 April 1971 – 6 December 1988
| Preceded by | multi-member district |
| Succeeded by | Hans-Henning Grünwald |
Member of the Bundestag for Neustadt – Speyer
In office 19 October 1965 – 17 July 1967
| Preceded by | Constituency established |
| Succeeded by | Ludwig Knobloch |

Personal details
- Born: 19 December 1932 Göttingen, Province of Hanover, Prussia, Germany
- Died: 2 March 2025 (aged 92) Speyer, Rhineland-Palatinate, Germany
- Party: CDU (from 1960)
- Relatives: Hans-Jochen Vogel (brother)
- Education: Heidelberg University; Ludwig-Maximilians-Universität München
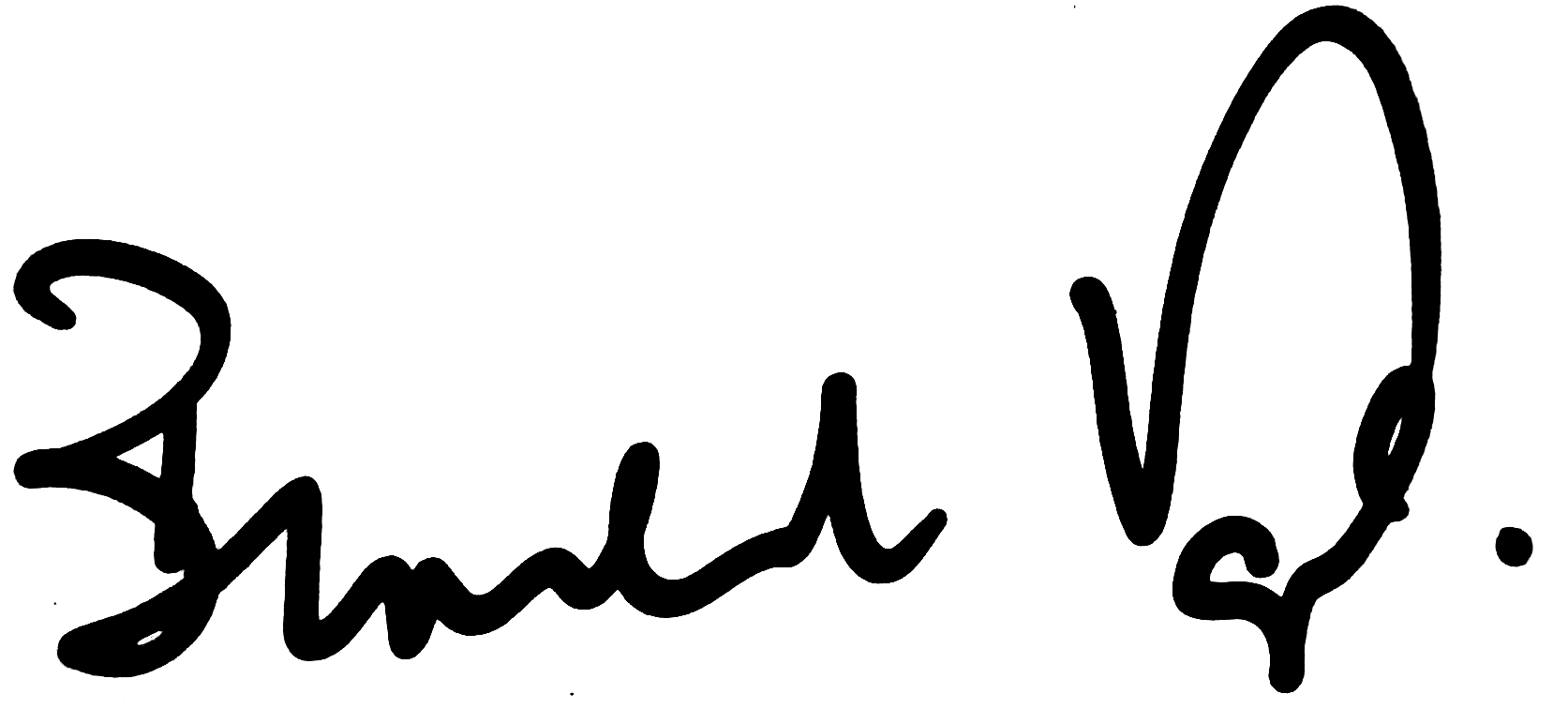
- Signature

Bernhard Vogel (German: [ˈbɛʁnhaʁt ˈfoːɡl̩]; 19 December 1932 – 2 March 2025) was a German politician of the Christian Democratic Union (CDU). He was the 4th Minister President of Rhineland-Palatinate from 1976 to 1988 and the second Minister President of Thuringia from 1992 to 2003. He was the only person to have been head of two different German federal states and was the longest-governing Minister President of Germany. He served as the 28th and 40th President of the Bundesrat in 1976 to 1977 and 1987 to 1988.

== Life and career ==
=== Early life and education ===
Vogel was born in Göttingen on 19 December 1932 and grew up in Giessen. He received his Abitur in Munich in 1953, and began studies in political science, history, sociology, and economics, first at Heidelberg University and then at the Ludwig-Maximilians-Universität München. He received his doctorate in 1960, while working as a research assistant at the Institute of Political Science at the University of Heidelberg. He became a lecturer there the following year, also working in adult education.

=== Political career ===
In 1960, Vogel joined the CDU. In 1963, Vogel was elected to the municipal council of Heidelberg, but resigned two years later, following his election to the Bundestag. He joined the governing board of the Christian Democratic Union of Germany in Rhineland-Palatinate in 1965. From 1965 to 1967, Vogel was a member of the German Bundestag, a position from which he resigned to assume the job of State Minister of Culture and Education in Rhineland-Palatinate under Minister President Peter Altmeier. He continued in the same cabinet position under Altmeier's successor in 1969, Helmut Kohl. In 1973, when Kohl became chair of the national CDU, Vogel succeeded him as state party chair in Rhineland-Palatinate.

In December 1976, Vogel became Minister-President of Rhineland-Palatinate to replace Kohl, who had been elected a federal deputy. Vogel immediately assumed the presidency of the Federal Council until 31 October 1977, at the same time becoming chairman of the supervisory board of the Zweites Deutsches Fernsehen (ZDF), Germany's second-largest public broadcaster. In the regional elections of March 1979 he maintained a bare majority of his party, with 50% of the vote and 51 regional deputies out of 100. In March 1983 the party improved its position, obtaining 52% of the vote and 57 deputies. Vogel became vice-president of the European Democratic Union (EDU) in 1985 and again won the regional elections on 17 May 1987 but with only a plurality of 45.1% of the vote and 48 deputies elected out of 100, ending the sixteen-year absolute majority of Christian Democrats. Vogel's failure to be re-elected as state chair of his party in 1988 led to his resignation as Minister President in a famous speech which he ended with the often-quoted phrase: "May God protect Rhineland-Palatinate!", an unusual display of public piety by German standards.

After his resignation, Vogel concentrated on the management of the Konrad Adenauer Foundation, of which he became chairman in 1989. After the resignation of the first Thuringian Prime Minister Josef Duchač 1992, Vogel became Minister-President of Thuringia on 5 February. From 1993 to 1999, he was chairman of the Thuringian CDU. He gave up the chairmanship of the Adenauer Foundation in 1993. 1994 CDU and SPD formed a grand coalition. In the 1999 elections, the CDU achieved an absolute majority. For reasons of age, Vogel resigned from office as Minister-President on 5 June 2003. He was followed by Dieter Althaus.

=== Life after politics ===
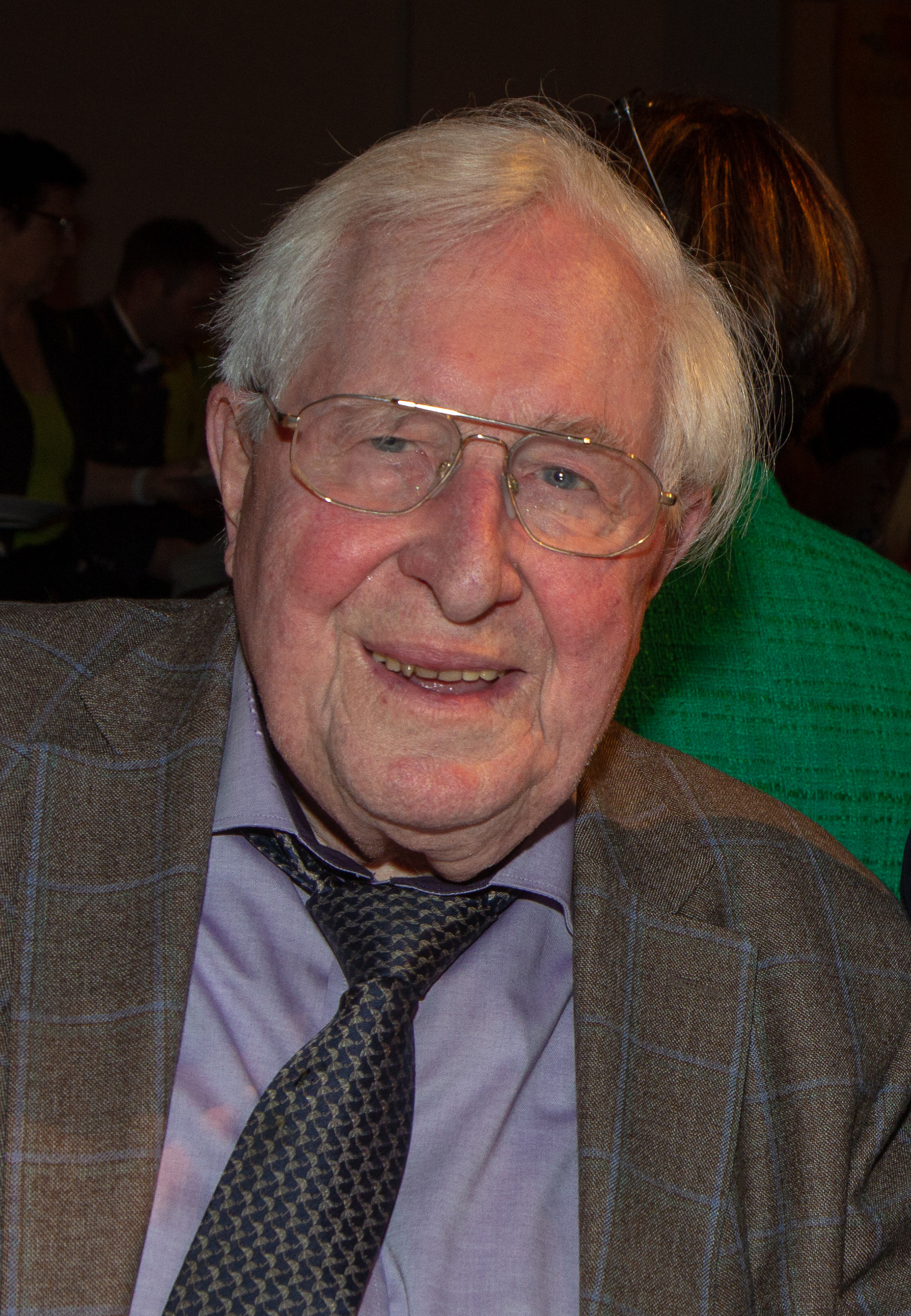
Vogel in 2019

From 2001 until 2009, Vogel served again as president of the Konrad Adenauer Foundation in Berlin.

In 2012, Vogel was awarded the Mercator Visiting Professorship for Political Management at the Universität Essen-Duisburg's NRW School of Governance. He gave both seminars and lectures at the university.

Vogel was nominated by his party as delegate to the Federal Convention for the purpose of electing the President of Germany in 2022.

=== Personal life and death ===
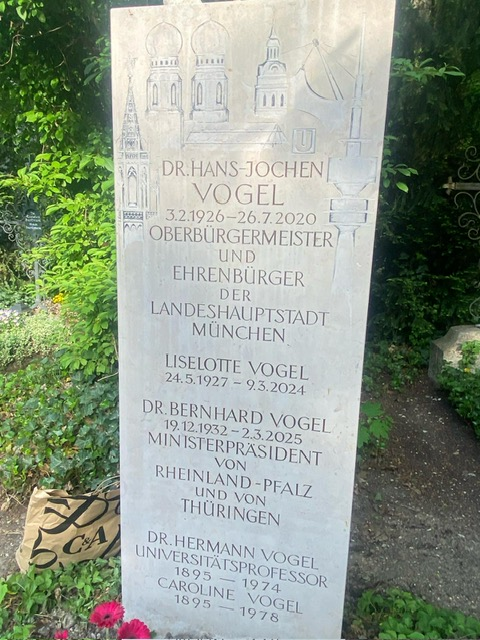
Gravestone of Bernhard Vogel with his brother Hans-Jochen Vogel, who died in 2020, his wife Liselotte and his parents in Munich

Vogel was a devout Roman Catholic. He was single and had no children. His brother was the SPD politician Hans-Jochen Vogel (1926–2020), a former mayor of Munich and Berlin, federal minister of justice and candidate for chancellorship. He had lived in Speyer. since 1965.

Vogel died in Speyer on 2 March 2025, at the age of 92.

== Other activities ==
=== Corporate boards ===
- Deutsche Vermögensberatung (DVAG), member of the advisory board

=== Non-profit organizations ===
- donum vitae, Member of the Board of Trustees (since 2001)
- CARE Deutschland-Luxemburg, member of the board of trustees
- Eugen Biser Foundation, member of the board of trustees
- European Foundation for the Speyer Cathedral, member of the board of trustees
- Konrad Adenauer Foundation (KAS), member of the board of trustees
- Willy Brandt Foundation, member of the board of trustees

== Awards ==
- 1984 Grand Cross 1st class of the Order of Merit of the Federal Republic of Germany
- 1990 Order of Merit of Rhineland-Palatinate
- 2002 Honorary citizen of Speyer
- 2005 Order of Merit of the Free State of Thuringia

== Sources ==
- Beckmann, Christopher (2017). Klares Ziel und langer Atem : Bernhard Vogel – Brückenbauer zwischen Ost und West. Deutschland- und außenpolitische Positionen und Aktivitäten (in German). Freiburg: Herder Verlag. ISBN 978-3-451-81221-7. OCLC 1003262432.
- Vogel, Bernhard; Roman Herzog; Michael Borchard; Uwe Spindeldreier (2002). "Lebensstationen". Sorge tragen für die Zukunft: Reden 1998–2002 (in German) (1st ed.). Berlin: Ch. Links Verlag. pp. 237f. ISBN 978-3-86153-283-5.
- Vogel, Bernhard; Vogel, Hans-Jochen (2007). Deutschland aus der Vogelperspektive (in German). Freiburg im Breisgau Basel Wien: Herder. ISBN 978-3-451-29810-3.
- Vogel, Bernhard (11 March 2024). Erst das Land (in German). Freiburg Basel Wien: Herder. ISBN 978-3-451-39545-1.
- Wiedemeyer, Wolfgang (1997). Bernhard Vogel (in German). Bonn: Bouvier Verlag. ISBN 978-3-416-02707-6.
