= Deutsche Reichspartei =

Far-right political party in West Germany

Deutsche Reichspartei (Note: lit. 'German Reich Party' or 'German Empire Party' or 'German Realm Party' or 'German Imperial Party')
- Abbreviation: DRP
- Leader: Heinrich Kunstmann; Adolf von Thadden; Alexander Andrae
- Founded: 21/22 January 1950; 76 years ago
- Dissolved: 1965; 61 years ago
- Merger of: German Right Party; National Democratic Party; Socialist Reich Party
- Merged into: National Democratic Party of Germany
- Newspaper: Reichsruf
- Ideology: Before 1952: German nationalism; Pan-Germanism; Antisemitism; Anti-communism; After 1952: Neo-Nazism
- Political position: Far-right
- European affiliation: National Party of Europe
- Colors: Brown

The Deutsche Reichspartei (DRP) was a nationalist, far-right, and later neo-Nazi political party in West Germany. It was founded in 1950 from the German Right Party (German: Deutsche Rechtspartei), which had been set up in Lower Saxony in 1946 and had five members in the first Bundestag, and from which it took the name. In the second Bundestag election (1953), the DRP got 1.1% of the votes. A certain success and only major breakthrough came in the 1959 Rhineland-Palatinate regional election, when it got 5.1% of the votes and sent a deputy to the Landtag of Rhineland-Palatinate.

Prior to its 1952 turn towards explicit neo-Nazism, the DRP advocated German nationalism, pan-Germanism and support of a new Reich, and pan-European nationalism. An anti-communist, antisemitic, and anti-socialist party, its criticism of capitalism was reflected in economic antisemitic terms rather than socialism, in addition to racial antisemitism. When the openly neo-Nazi-oriented Socialist Reich Party (SRP) was declared unconstitutional and disbanded (October 1952) by the Federal Constitutional Court of Germany, many of its members joined the DRP. With its lack of success, the party was symbolically liquidated and followed by the establishment of the National Democratic Party of Germany (NPD).

== Formation ==
The DRP was established in 1950 when the majority of the Deutsche Rechtspartei (German Right Party) members of the Bundestag decided to establish a more formal party network under the DRP name. The new party absorbed the National Democrats, a splinter group from Hesse. The party took its name from an earlier eponymous group that had existed during the German Empire period. The initial three deputy chairmen, Wilhelm Meinberg, Otto Hess, and Heinrich Kunstmann, had all been members of the Nazi Party. From 1951, the group published its own newspaper, which was titled Reichsruf (Call of the Reich).

== Development ==
On 6 May 1951, the party won 2.2 percent of the vote in Lower Saxony state election and with that, three deputies (as the state did not have an electoral hurdle before 1959). However, they were overshadowed by the explicitly neo-Nazi Socialist Reich Party (SRP), which received 11% of the vote.

The party moved towards explicit neo-Nazism in 1952, when the SRP was declared unconstitutional and disbanded by the Federal Constitutional Court of Germany. Much of its membership then joined the DRP. The membership of Hans-Ulrich Rudel in 1953 was seen as marking out the party as the new force of neo-Nazism and he enjoyed close ties to Savitri Devi and Nazi mysticism.

Stability under chancellor Konrad Adenauer of the Christian Democratic Union of Germany and the growth experienced during the Wirtschaftswunder meant that the DRP struggled for support, averaging around only 1% of the national votes in the federal elections of 1953, 1957, and 1961. The party still won 3.8% of the vote in the 1955 Lower Saxony state election and sent six deputies to the state assembly. In November 1957, the Lower Saxonian FDP and GB/BHE formed a joint parliamentary group and accepted the DRP members as the group's guest members, however, the state Minister-President Heinrich Hellwege (DP) was not willing to include them and formed a new coalition with DP, CDU and SPD. The party's only major breakthrough came in the 1959 Rhineland-Palatinate state election, where it won 5.1% of the vote and thus was able to send one deputy, Hans Schikora, to the assembly.

The party's sudden breakthrough was due to local winegrowers' concerns that West German membership in the European Economic Community (ECC) would intensify competition with better and cheaper French wines, thus destroying their livelihoods; Rhineland-Palatinate being Germany's most important winegrowing region at the time. As a result, the DRP's protectionism, as well as its anti-French sentiment with the slogan "Out with all the Occupiers" ("Raus mit allen Besatzern"), resonated with the winegrowers. However, the lone Schikora was quickly isolated by the democratic parties (CDU, SPD, FDP).

On Christmas Eve 1959, two DRP party members, Arnold Strunk and Josef Schönen, defaced the Roonstrasse Synagogue in Cologne with swastikas and the inscription "Deutsche fordern: Juden raus" ("Germans demand: Jews out"). They were sentenced to 14 and 10 months in prison, respectively, with loss of civil rights for two years.

The party's Rhineland-Palatinate branch was declared to be an SRP successor organization and banned by the state's interior minister August Wolters (CDU) on 26 January 1960. The federal party leadership held Schikora responsible for this legal punishment and expelled him from the party. The SRP-associated members of party's previous state executive committee were also expelled, and the party ban was lifted on 24 November 1960. At the party's state delegates' conference in October 1961, the national-neutralist wing achieved a majority and re-elected Schikora as state chairman; however, he was again dismissed two months later and the party began to dissolve. By 1962, the state association had lost around 30% of its members, and in the 1963 state elections, the party fell below the 5% vote threshold and left the Landtag.

In 1962, the party took part in an international conference of far-right groups hosted in Venice by Oswald Mosley and signed up as members of his National Party of Europe. This initiative did not take off as Mosley had hoped, as few of the member parties, including the DRP, were interested in changing their name to National Party of Europe, as he had hoped they would. One of the party's last acts in 1964 saw it sponsor a tour of Germany by controversial American historian David L. Hoggan, a prominent Holocaust denier.

== Dissolution ==
Their lack of national success saw the leaders of the DRP seek to extend their influence further, and they made contact with the leaders of other rightist parties, such as the German Party and its successor (following that organisation's merger with the All-German Bloc/League of Expellees and Deprived of Rights), the Gesamtdeutsche Partei seeking close ties. It was soon decided that a more formal union with other rightist groups was desirable. They held their final party conference in Bonn in 1964 in which they voted to form a new union of "national democratic forces". The party was symbolically liquidated, with the Nationaldemokratische Partei Deutschlands (National Democratic Party of Germany, NPD) established immediately afterwards.

== Election results ==
=== Federal parliament (Bundestag) ===
Election	Constituency		Party list		Seats	+/–	Government
Election	Votes	%	Votes	%	Seats	+/–	Government
1953	204,725	0.74	295,739	1.07	0 / 509		
1957	290,622	0.96	308,564	1.03	0 / 519		
1961	242,649	0.76	262,977	0.83	0 / 521		

== See also ==
- 1953 West German federal election
- 1957 West German federal election
- 1961 West German federal election
- Far-right politics in Germany (1945–present)
