= List of minister-presidents of Rhineland-Palatinate =

Minister-President of Rhineland-Palatinate
- Ministerpräsident des Landes Rheinland-Pfalz
- Coat of arms of Rhineland-Palatinate

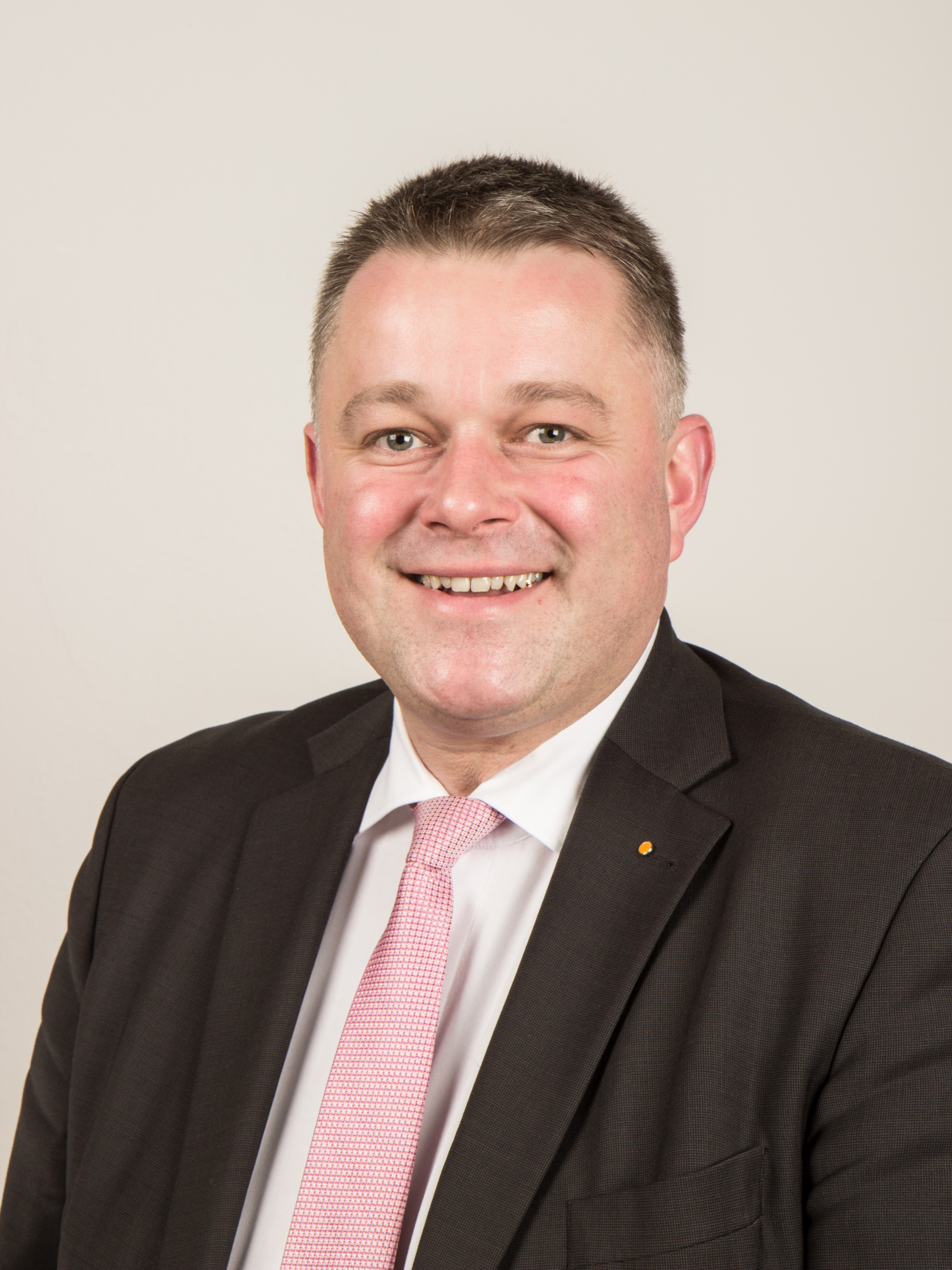
- Incumbent; Gordon Schnieder since 18 May 2026
- Residence: Mainz
- Appointer: Landtag of Rhineland-Palatinate
- Term length: congruous with the legislative term of the Landtag
- Inaugural holder: Wilhelm Boden
- Formation: 18 May 1947
- Salary: regulated by legislation

The minister-president of Rhineland-Palatinate (German: Ministerpräsident des Landes Rheinland-Pfalz), is the head of government of the German state of Rhineland-Palatinate. The position was created in 1946, through the unification of the southern part of the Prussian Rhine Province, the Bavarian administrative district Circle of the Rhine and western parts of Hesse like Rheinhessen to form the state of Rhineland-Palatinate. The current minister-president is Alexander Schweitzer, heading a coalition government between the Social Democrats, Greens and the FDP. Schweitzer succeeded Malu Dreyer in 2024.

The office of the minister-president is known as the state chancellery (German: Staatskanzlei) and is located in the capital of Mainz, along with the rest of the cabinet departments.

== List ==
Political party: CDU SPD

Portrait	Name (Born–Died)	Term of office			Political party	Cabinet
Portrait	Name (Born–Died)	Took office	Left office	Days	Political party	Cabinet
1	Wilhelm Boden (1890–1961)	1 December 1946	9 July 1947	220 days	CDU	I II
2	Peter Altmeier (1899–1977)	9 July 1947	19 May 1969	21 years, 314 days	CDU	I II III IV V VI
3	Helmut Kohl (1930–2017)	19 May 1969	2 December 1976 resigned	7 years, 197 days	CDU	I II III
4	Bernhard Vogel (1932–2025)	2 December 1976	8 December 1988 resigned	12 years, 6 days	CDU	I II III IV
5	Carl-Ludwig Wagner (1930–2012)	8 December 1988	21 May 1991	2 years, 164 days	CDU	I
6	Rudolf Scharping (born 1947)	21 May 1991	26 October 1994 resigned elected to the Bundestag	3 years, 158 days	SPD	I
7	Kurt Beck (born 1949)	26 October 1994	16 January 2013 resigned	18 years, 82 days	SPD	I II III IV V
8	Malu Dreyer (born 1961)	16 January 2013	10 July 2024	11 years, 176 days	SPD	I II III
9	Alexander Schweitzer (born 1973)	10 July 2024	18 May 2026	1 year, 312 days	SPD	I
10	Gordon Schnieder (born 1975)	18 May 2026	Incumbent	126 days	CDU	I

== See also ==
- Rhineland-Palatinate
- Politics of Rhineland-Palatinate
- Landtag of Rhineland-Palatinate
