= List of elections in 1963 =

The following elections occurred in 1963.

== Africa ==
- 1963 Algerian constitutional referendum
- 1963 Algerian presidential election
- 1963 Chadian parliamentary election
- 1963 Moroccan parliamentary election
- 1963 Republic of the Congo parliamentary election
- 1963 Republic of the Congo presidential election
- 1963 Republic of the Congo constitutional referendum
- 1963 Senegalese general election
- 1963 Togolese general election
- 1963 Togolese constitutional referendum
- 1963 Kenyan legislative election
- 1963 Liberian general election
- 1963 Mauritian general election
- 1963 Togolese constitutional referendum
- 1963 Zanzibari general election

== Asia ==
- 1963 Indonesian presidential election
- 1963 Israeli presidential election
- 1963 Japanese general election
- 1963 Jordanian general election
- 1963 Kuwaiti general election
- 1963 Malayan local elections
- 1963 Mongolian parliamentary election
- 1963 North Korean local elections
- 1963 Philippine Senate election
- 1963 Singaporean general election
- 1963 South Korean legislative election
- 1963 South Korean presidential election
- 1963 South Vietnamese parliamentary election
- 1963 Turkish local elections

=== Iran ===
- 1963 Iranian constitutional referendum
- 1963 Iranian legislative election

== Europe ==
- 1963 Austrian presidential election
- 1963 Dutch general election
- 1963 East German general election
- 1963 Greek legislative election
- 1963 Greek parliamentary election
- 1963 Hungarian parliamentary election
- 1963 Icelandic parliamentary election
- 1963 Italian general election
- 1963 Liechtenstein local elections
- 1963 Monegasque general election
- 1963 Norwegian local elections
- 1963 Swiss federal election
- 1963 Swiss referendums
- 1963 Turkish local elections
- Cardinal electors in the 1963 conclave
- 1963 Yugoslavian parliamentary election

=== Germany ===
- 1963 Rhineland-Palatinate state election

=== United Kingdom ===
- 1963 Belfast South by-election
- 1963 Bristol South East by-election
- 1963 Colne Valley by-election
- 1963 Deptford by-election
- 1963 Dumfriesshire by-election
- 1963 Dundee West by-election
- 1963 Kinross and Western Perthshire by-election
- 1963 Labour Party leadership election (UK)
- 1963 Leeds South by-election
- 1963 Luton by-election
- 1963 Manchester Openshaw by-election
- 1963 Rotherham by-election
- 1963 St Marylebone by-election
- 1963 Stratford by-election
- 1963 Swansea East by-election
- 1963 West Bromwich by-election
- 1963 United Kingdom local elections

== North America ==
=== Canada ===
- 1963 Alberta general election
- 1963 British Columbia general election
- 1963 Canadian federal election
- 1963 Edmonton municipal election
- 1963 New Brunswick general election
- 1963 Nova Scotia general election
- 1963 Ontario general election

=== United States ===
==== United States gubernatorial ====
- 1963 Kentucky gubernatorial election
- 1963 Mississippi gubernatorial election
- 1963 United States gubernatorial elections

==== United States House of Representatives ====
- 1963 United States House of Representatives elections

==== United States mayoral elections ====
- 1963 Baltimore mayoral election
- 1963 Boston mayoral election
- 1963 Chicago mayoral election
- 1963 Cleveland mayoral election
- 1963 Columbus mayoral election
- 1963 Dallas mayoral election
- 1963 Evansville mayoral election
- 1963 Indianapolis mayoral election
- 1963 Manchester mayoral election
- 1963 Philadelphia mayoral election
- 1963 San Diego mayoral election
- 1963 San Francisco mayoral election
- 1963 South Bend mayoral election
- 1963 Springfield mayoral election
- 1963 Tampa mayoral election

== Oceania ==
- 1963 Fijian general election
- 1963 New Zealand general election
- 1963 Tongan general election

=== Australia ===
- 1963 Australian federal election
- 1963 East Sydney by-election
- 1963 Grey by-election
- 1963 Queensland state election

== South America ==
- 1963 Argentine general election
- 1963 Brazilian constitutional referendum
- 1963 Venezuelan presidential election
- 1963 Peruvian general election
- 1963 Paraguayan general election
- 1963 Honduran general election
- 1963 Nicaraguan general election
