= 2019 Tampa mayoral election =

- March 5 and April 23, 2019
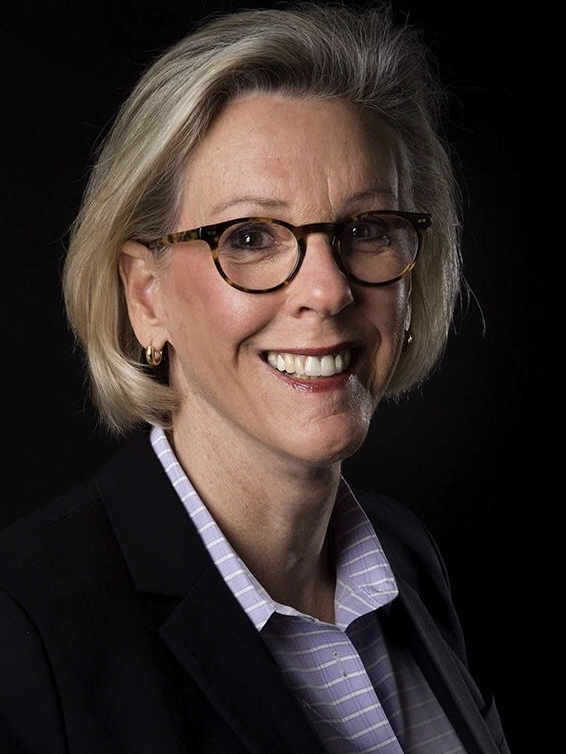

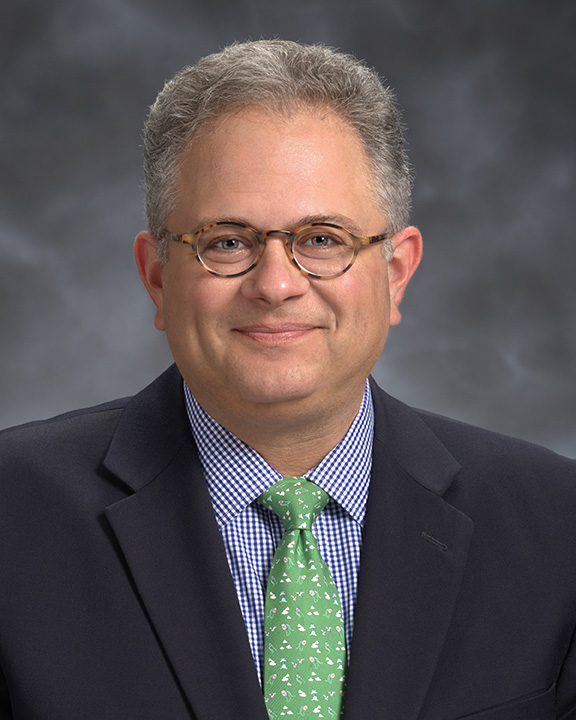

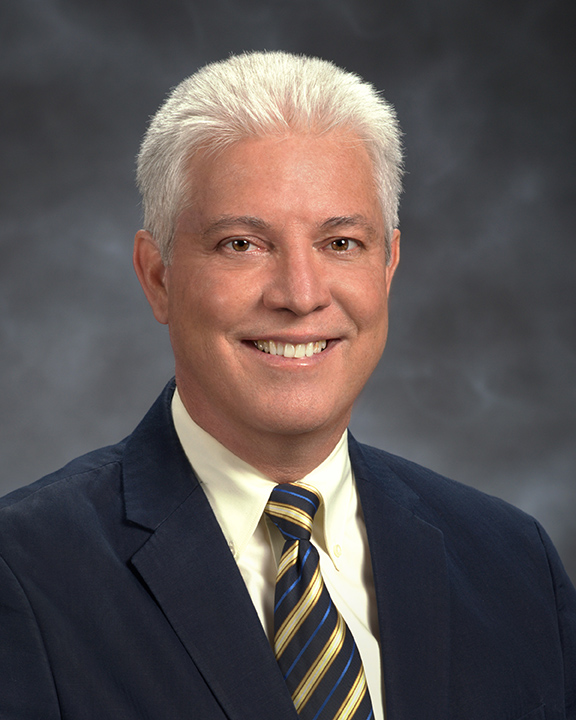
Candidate	Jane Castor	David Straz Jr.	Harry Cohen
First round	23,324; 47.98%	7,522; 15.47%	5,907; 12.15%
Runoff	38,859; 73.10%	14,300; 26.90%	Eliminated
Candidate	Ed Turanchik	Dick Greco Jr	Mike Suarez
First round	4,320; 8.89%	4,158; 8.55%	2,462; 5.06%
Runoff	Eliminated	Eliminated	Eliminated
- Runoff results by precinct Castor: 50–60% 60–70% 70–80% 80–90% >90% Straz: 50–60% No votes
Mayor before election
Bob Buckhorn
Elected mayor
Jane Castor

An election for mayor of Tampa was held on March 5, 2019. The election is officially nonpartisan, and the winner is elected to a four-year term.

Incumbent mayor Bob Buckhorn was not eligible to run for a third term. Buckhorn was first elected in 2011 (winning in the second round with 62.86% of the vote) and reelected unopposed in 2015. Jane Castor and David Straz headed off into a runoff election on April 23, 2019, as no candidate received the majority fifty percent. Castor defeated Straz in the runoff election, becoming mayor-elect of Tampa.

== Candidates ==
=== Declared ===
- Jane Castor, former police chief
- Harry Cohen, two-term city councilman
- Dick Greco Jr., retired judge and son of former Mayor Dick A. Greco
- Michael Anthony Hazard, small business owner
- LaVaughn King, activist
- Topher Morrison, small business owner
- David Straz Jr., philanthropist
- Mike Suarez, member of Tampa City Council
- Ed Turanchik, former Hillsborough County commissioner

=== Did not file ===
- Mike Griffin, former chairman of Tampa Chamber of Commerce
- Ed Narain, former state representative

=== Withdrawn ===
- Sam Gibbons, graduate student and grandson of late U.S. Representative Sam Gibbons

== Endorsements ==
David Straz Jr.

Labor unions

- International Brotherhood of Electrical Workers (IBEW) Local 824
- International Union of Operating Engineers Local 487
- Northwest Florida Chapter of Black Women in Construction
- Plumbers and Pipefitters Local Union 123
- United Food and Commercial Workers (UFCW) 1625
Jane Castor

Individuals

- Former fire chief Tom Forward
- Former police chief Steve Hogue
- Former police chief Bennie Holder

== Fundraising ==
Campaign finance reports as of November 21, 2018
Candidate (party)	Total receipts	Total expenditures
Jane Castor	$176,858.80	$32,524.63
Harry Cohen	$97,625.00	$38,217.37
Michael Anthony Hazard	$262.90	$122.90
LaVaughn King	$0.00	$0.00
Topher Morrison	$58,642.81	$44,421.93
David Straz Jr.	$1,592,940.00	$1,007,724.65
Mike Suarez	$49,788.00	$8,183.00
Ed Turanchik	$171,474.00	$76,401.36

== Polling ==
Poll source	Date(s) administered	Sample size	Margin of error	Jane Castor	Harry Cohen	David Straz Jr.	Mike Suarez	Ed Turanchik	Dick Greco, Jr.	Other	Undecided
St. Pete Polls	May 10, 2018	424	±4.8%	47.3%	5.4%	7.8%	5.5%	9.7%	-	8.3%	15.9%
St. Pete Polls	June 24, 2018	496	±4.4%	40.9%	7.3%	10.6%	7.2%	7.2%	-	7.8%	18.9%
St. Pete Polls	February 5, 2019	429	±4.7%	45.3%	7.5%	12.9%	6.0%	6.7%	9.3%	-	10.8%

== Results ==
=== First round ===
2019 Tampa mayoral primary election
Party	Candidate	Votes	%
Nonpartisan	Jane Castor	23,324	47.98%
Nonpartisan	David Straz	7,522	15.47%
Nonpartisan	Harry Cohen	5,907	12.15%
Nonpartisan	Ed Turanchik	4,320	8.89%
Nonpartisan	Dick Greco, Jr.	4,158	8.55%
Nonpartisan	Mike Suarez	2,462	5.06%
Nonpartisan	Topher Morrison	839	1.73%
Write-in		80	0.16%
Total votes		48,612	100.00%

=== Runoff ===
2019 Tampa mayoral general election
Party	Candidate	Votes	%
Nonpartisan	Jane Castor	38,859	73.10%
Nonpartisan	David Straz	14,300	26.90%
Total votes		53,159	100.00%
