= 1963 Tampa mayoral election =

← 1959	September 10, 1963; September 24, 1963	1967 →
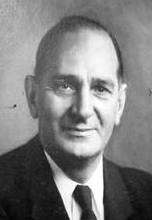

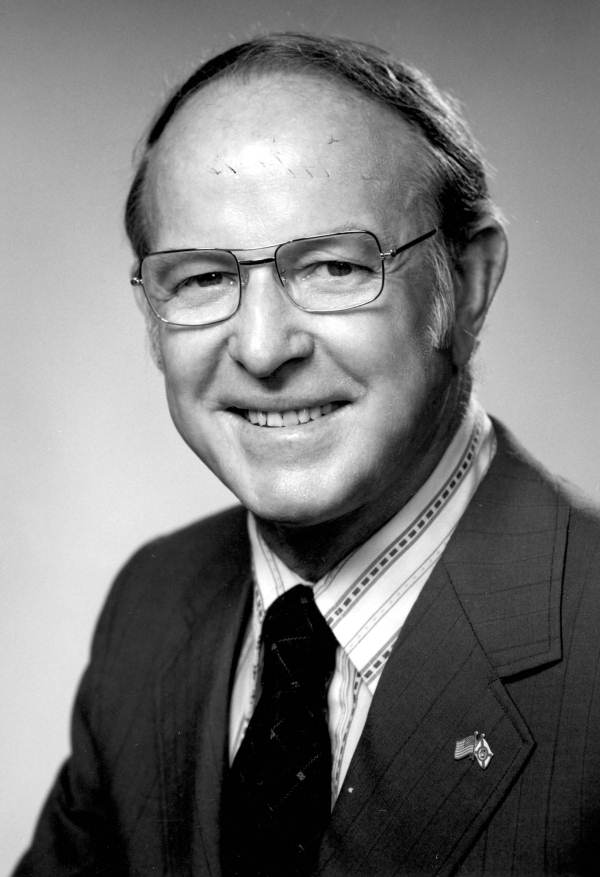

Candidate	Nick Nuccio	Julian Lane	Ed Blackburn, Jr.
First round	23,497; 36.87%	22,467; 35.26%	9,554; 14.99%
Runoff	36,144; 51.19%	34,467; 48.81%	Eliminated
Mayor before election
Julian Lane
Nonpartisan
Elected mayor
Nick Nuccio
Nonpartisan

The 1963 Tampa mayoral election was held on September 24, 1963, following a primary election on September 10, 1963. Incumbent Mayor Julian Lane ran for re-election to a second term. He was challenged by former Mayor Nick Nuccio, whom Lane defeated in 1959, Sheriff Ed Blackburn, and wholesale furniture executive Guy Burnett. In the primary, Nuccio narrowly came in first, winning 37 percent to Lane's 35 percent, and both advanced to the general election. Nuccio defeated Lane by a slim margin, 51–49 percent, to return to office.

== Primary election ==
=== Candidates ===
- Nick Nuccio, Hillsborough County Commissioner, former Mayor
- Julian Lane, incumbent Mayor
- Ed Blackburn, Jr., Hillsborough County Sheriff
- Guy A. Burnett, Jr., wholesale furniture executive
- Jim Fair, perennial candidate

=== Results ===
1963 Tampa mayoral primary election (Note: The Hillsborough County Supervisor of Elections website erroneously split the election results into two separate pages and labeled Lane's vote total as belonging to a September 19, 1963, election.)
Party	Candidate	Votes	%
Nonpartisan	Nick Nuccio	23,497	36.87%
Nonpartisan	Julian Lane (inc.)	22,467	35.26%
Nonpartisan	Ed Blackburn, Jr.	9,554	14.99%
Nonpartisan	Guy A. Burnett, Jr.	5,323	8.35%
Nonpartisan	Jim Fair	2,881	4.52%
Total votes		63,722	100.00%

== General election ==
=== Results ===
1963 Tampa mayoral general election
Party	Candidate	Votes	%
Nonpartisan	Nick Nuccio	36,144	51.19%
Nonpartisan	Julian Lane (inc.)	34,467	48.81%
Total votes		70,611	100.00%
