= 1971 Tampa mayoral election =

- September 14, 1971
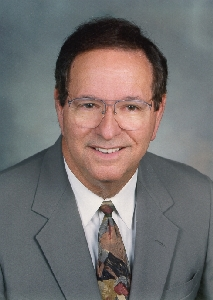

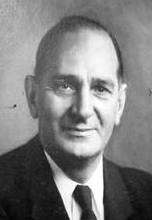
Candidate	Dick A. Greco	Nick Nuccio
Party	Nonpartisan	Nonpartisan
Popular vote	32,169	13,909
Percentage	66.10%	28.58%
Mayor before election
Dick A. Greco
Nonpartisan
Elected mayor
Dick A. Greco
Nonpartisan

The 1971 Tampa mayoral election took place on September 14, 1971. Incumbent Mayor Dick A. Greco ran for re-election to a second term. He was challenged by former Mayor Nick Nuccio, whom he defeated in 1967. Greco defeated Nuccio in a landslide, winning 66 percent of the vote and avoiding the need for a runoff election. In the process, he became the first mayor of Tampa to be re-elected since 1955. However, Greco did not end up serving his full term. He resigned from office in 1974, triggering a special election later that year.

== Candidates ==
- Sam Capitano, tile-setter
- Dick A. Greco, incumbent mayor
- Nick Nuccio, former mayor
- Armando P. Valdes, Jr., jeweler, 1967 City Council candidate

== Results ==
1971 Tampa mayoral election
Party	Candidate	Votes	%
Nonpartisan	Dick A. Greco (inc.)	32,169	66.10%
Nonpartisan	Nick Nuccio	13,909	28.58%
Nonpartisan	Armando P. Valdes, Jr.	1,848	3.80%
Nonpartisan	Sam Capitano	740	1.52%
Total votes		48,666	100.00%
