= Jim Davis (Florida politician) =

American politician (born 1957)

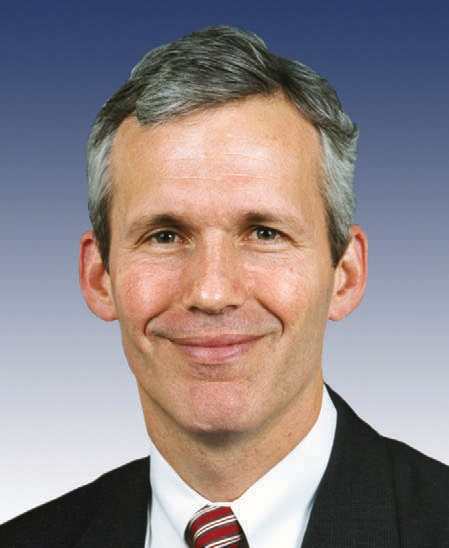

Member of the U.S. House of Representatives from Florida's 11th district
- In office January 3, 1997 – January 3, 2007
- Preceded by: Sam Gibbons
- Succeeded by: Kathy Castor

Member of the Florida House of Representatives
- In office November 8, 1988 – November 5, 1996
- Preceded by: Helen Gordon Davis
- Succeeded by: Sandra Murman
- Constituency: 64th district (1988–1992); 56th district (1992–1996)

Personal details
- Born: James Oscar Davis III; October 11, 1957 (age 69) Tampa, Florida, U.S.
- Party: Democratic
- Spouse: Peggy Bessent
- Education: Washington and Lee University (BA); University of Florida (JD)

James Oscar Davis III (born October 11, 1957) is an American politician and attorney from the U.S. state of Florida. He is a Democrat. He served in the U.S. House of Representatives from 1997 to 2007, representing Florida's 11th congressional district. He was the Democratic nominee for governor of Florida in the 2006 election, but was defeated by the Republican candidate Charlie Crist.

== Early life and career ==
Davis was born in Tampa, Florida. He graduated from Jesuit High School of Tampa in 1975, and attended Washington and Lee University, where he received his Bachelor of Arts degree in 1979. He later attended the University of Florida's College of Law, received his Juris Doctor in 1982. Davis worked as a lawyer in private practice from 1982 to 1988, when he became a partner in the Tampa-based law firm of Bush, Ross, Gardner, Warren & Rudy.

== Florida House of Representatives ==
In 1988, Democratic State Representative Helen Gordon Davis, who represented the 64th District, opted to run for the Florida Senate rather than seek re-election. Davis ran to succeed her, and centered his campaign around his experience with civil rights litigation. He faced a crowded Democratic primary, and was endorsed by the St. Petersburg Times, which praised his "thoughtful campaign" and "knowledgeable command of Florida," and by the Tampa Tribune, which noted that he had "the makings of a long-term legislator."

Davis placed first in the primary election with 43 percent of the vote, but failed to receive a majority, and advanced to a runoff election with attorney Tom Wright, who placed a distant second with 16 percent of the vote. Davis won the runoff election in a landslide, receiving 65 percent of the vote, and advanced to the general election, where he was opposed by Republican nominee Maxx Hudson. Owing to the strong Democratic lean of the district, Davis defeated Hudson by a wide margin, winning 67 percent of the vote.

Davis was re-elected unopposed in 1990. In 1992, following the reconfiguration of state legislative districts after the 1990 census, Davis ran for re-election in District 56, and was challenged by businessman Carl Mathews, the Republican nominee. Davis defeated Mathews by a wide margin, but reduced from his previous races, winning 56 percent of the vote.

In 1994, during a dismal national environment for Democrats, Davis faced a serious challenge from Republican businessman Bill Butler. The race was initially too close to call, but Davis ended up becoming one of the few Democratic candidates to win locally, receiving 51 percent of the vote to Butler's 49 percent.

During the 1994 to 1996 legislative session, Davis was elected Majority Leader of the Florida House of Representatives, serving under Speaker Peter Rudy Wallace.

== Congress ==
In 1996, Democratic Congressman Sam Gibbons declined to seek re-election to an eighteenth term, and Davis ran to succeed him in the 11th district. He faced a crowded Democratic primary that included former State Senator Pat Frank, former Tampa Mayor Sandra Freedman, and County Commissioner Phyllis Busansky. Freedman placed first in the primary with 35 percent of the vote. Davis ultimately placed second, winning 24.9 percent of the vote to Busansky's 24.5 percent, a result that was confirmed by a recount. Davis ultimately defeated Freedman in the runoff by a wide margin, receiving 56 percent of the vote to Freedman's 44 percent, despite Freedman's status as a frontrunner. In the general election, Davis faced Republican Mark Sharpe, who had narrowly lost to Gibbons in 1994. Davis defeated Sharpe by a larger margin than Gibbons had, winning 58 percent of the vote.

Davis was challenged in 1998 by Republican Hillsborough County Commissioner Joe Chillura. Davis won re-election in a landslide, receiving 65 percent of the vote. He was re-elected in 2000 with 85 percent of the vote against Libertarian Charlie Westlake, was unopposed in 2002, and defeated Libertarian Robert Edward Johnson with 86 percent of the vote in 2004.

On October 10, 2002, Jim Davis was among the 81 House Democrats who voted in favor of authorizing the invasion of Iraq.

== 2006 campaign for Governor ==
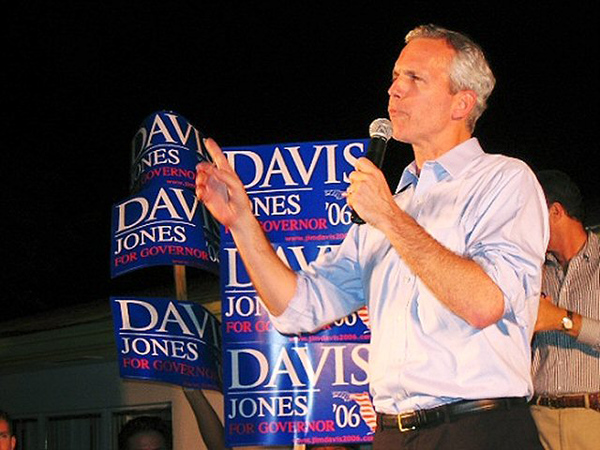
Davis campaigning in Wilton Manors

Davis declined to seek re-election to Congress in 2006, instead announcing on February 10, 2005, that he would run for Governor of Florida. He won the Democratic primary over State Senator Rod Smith with 47 percent of the vote, and faced Republican Attorney General Charlie Crist in the general election. Davis selected former State Senator Daryl Jones, who had endorsed Smith in the primary, as his running mate.

Despite the favorable national environment for Democrats, Davis lost to Crist, winning 45 percent of the vote to Crist's 52 percent.

== Post-congressional career ==
Following his departure from Congress, Davis joined the Tampa and Washington, D.C. offices of law firm Holland & Knight.

In 2010, Davis joined the campaign of Moving Hillsborough Forward, a political action committee that was organized to support a transit tax in Hillsborough County to fund the creation of a light rail system in the region. The tax ultimately lost in a landslide, with 58 percent of voters rejecting the measure.

Davis considered running for Mayor of Tampa in 2011, with outgoing Mayor Pam Iorio suggesting that he would be "excellent." However, in the aftermath of the transit tax defeat, Davis ultimately declined to run.

== Electoral history ==
Florida's 11th congressional district: Results 1996–2006
Year	Democrat	Votes	Pct	Republican	Votes	Pct	3rd Party	Party	Votes	Pct
1996	Jim Davis	108,522	57.9%	Mark Sharpe	78,881	42.1%				
1998	Jim Davis	85,262	64.9%	Joe Chillura	46,176	35.1%				
2000	Jim Davis	149,433	84.6%	(no candidate)			Charlie Westlake	Libertarian	27,194	15.4%
2002	Jim Davis	Unopposed	100%	(no candidate)						
2004	Jim Davis	191,780	85.8%	(no candidate)			Robert Edward Johnson	Libertarian	31,579	14.1%

== Personal life ==
Davis's wife is Peggy Bessent Davis. The couple have two children, Peter and William. He is a member of the Episcopal Church.

U.S. House of Representatives
Preceded by Sam Gibbons	Member of the U.S. House of Representatives from Florida's 11th congressional district 1997–2007	Succeeded by Kathy Castor
Party political offices
Preceded by Cal Dooley; Jim Moran; Tim Roemer	Chair of the New Democrat Coalition; 2001–2005; Served alongside: Ron Kind, Adam Smith	Succeeded by Artur Davis; Ron Kind; Ellen Tauscher
Preceded by Bill McBride	Democratic nominee for Governor of Florida; 2006	Succeeded by Alex Sink
U.S. order of precedence (ceremonial)
Preceded by Mark Foley as Former U.S. Representative	Order of precedence of the United States as Former U.S. Representative	Succeeded by Adam Putnam as Former U.S. Representative
