= 1959 Tampa mayoral election =

- September 8, 1959; September 22, 1959
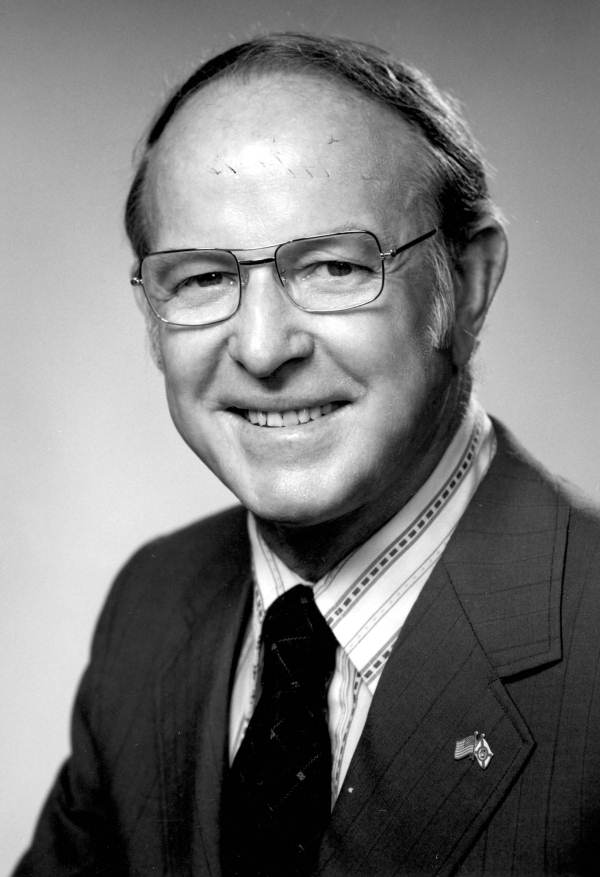

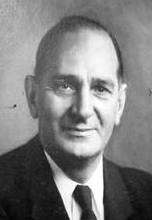

Candidate	Julian Lane	Nick Nuccio	J. L. Young, Jr.
First round	25,917; 38.53%	25,917; 40.55%	12,347; 18.36%
Runoff	37,823; 53.47%	32,910; 46.53%	Eliminated
Mayor before election
Nick Nuccio
Nonpartisan
Elected mayor
Julian Lane
Nonpartisan

The 1959 Tampa mayoral election was held on September 22, 1959, following a primary election on September 8, 1959. Incumbent Mayor Nick Nuccio, who was first elected in a 1956 special election, ran for re-election to a full term. Despite Nuccio's prediction that he would not "have any opposition," he was challenged by former Mayor J. L. Young, Jr., whom he had defeated in 1956, and dairy executive Julian Lane. Nuccio placed first in the primary election, winning 41 percent of the vote, and Lane placed second with 39 percent. In the ensuing general election, Lane narrowly defeated Nuccio, 53–47 percent.

== Primary election ==
=== Candidates ===
- Julian Lane, dairy executive, campaign manager for Governor Dan McCarty
- Joe E. Manning, real estate agent
- Nick Nuccio, incumbent mayor
- J. L. Young, Jr.

=== Results ===
1959 Tampa mayoral primary election
Party	Candidate	Votes	%
Nonpartisan	Nick Nuccio (inc.)	27,274	40.55%
Nonpartisan	Julian Lane	25,917	38.53%
Nonpartisan	J. L. Young, Jr.	12,347	18.36%
Nonpartisan	Joe E. Manning	1,720	2.56%
Total votes		67,258	100.00%

== General election ==
=== Results ===
1959 Tampa mayoral general election
Party	Candidate	Votes	%
Nonpartisan	Julian Lane	37,823	53.47%
Nonpartisan	Nick Nuccio (inc.)	32,910	46.53%
Total votes		70,733	100.00%
