= 2011 Tampa mayoral election =

- March 1, 2011 (first-round); March 22, 2011 (runoff)
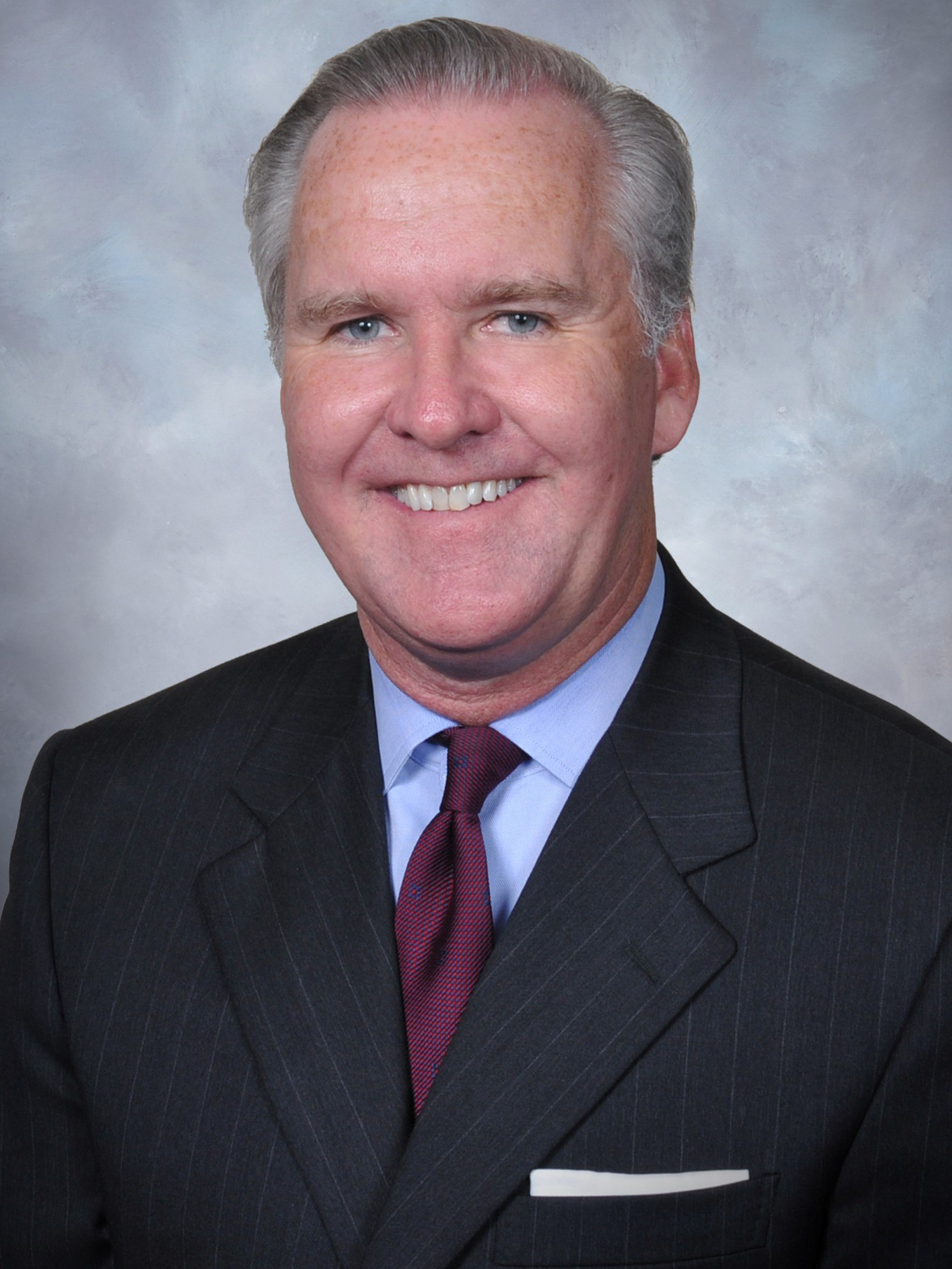

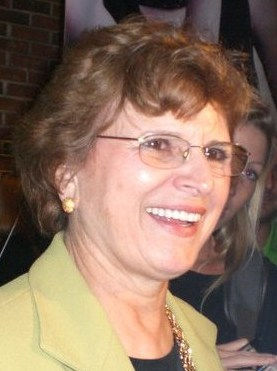

Candidate	Bob Buckhorn	Rose Ferlita
First round	9,824; 23.51%	10,808; 25.87%
Runoff	26,708; 62.86%	15,778; 37.14%
Candidate	Dick A. Greco	Ed Turanchik
First round	9,441; 22.59%	3,601; 8.62%
Runoff	Eliminated	Eliminated
Mayor before election
Pam Iorio
Nonpartisan
Elected mayor
Bob Buckhorn
Nonpartisan

The 2011 Tampa mayoral election took place on March 22, 2011, following a primary election on March 1, 2011. Incumbent Mayor Pam Iorio was term-limited and barred from seeking a third consecutive term. A crowded field emerged to succeed Iorio. Former Congressman Jim Davis, the 2006 Democratic nominee for governor, contemplated entering the race, but ultimately declined to run. Former Mayor Dick A. Greco announced that he would run, seeking a fifth term, and emerged as one of the frontrunners. However, in a close race, County Commissioner Rose Ferlita and former City Councilmember Bob Buckhorn narrowly beat Greco. Ferlita won 26 percent and advanced to the runoff with Buckhorn, who defeated Greco for second place, 24–23 percent. In the runoff election, Buckhorn defeated Ferlita in a landslide, receiving 63 percent of the vote to her 37 percent.

== Candidates ==
- Bob Buckhorn, former city councilmember, 2003 candidate for mayor
- Rose Ferlita, former Hillsborough County commissioner
- Dick A. Greco, former mayor
- Thomas Scott, city councilmember
- Ed Turanchik, former Hillsborough County commissioner

=== Results ===
2011 Tampa mayoral primary election
Party	Candidate	Votes	%
Nonpartisan	Rose Ferlita	10,808	25.87%
Nonpartisan	Bob Buckhorn	9,824	23.51%
Nonpartisan	Dick A. Greco	9,441	22.59%
Nonpartisan	Ed Turanchik	8,110	19.41%
Nonpartisan	Thomas Scott	3,601	8.62%
Total votes		41,784	100.00%

== General election ==
2011 Tampa mayoral general election
Party	Candidate	Votes	%
Nonpartisan	Bob Buckhorn	26,708	62.86%
Nonpartisan	Rose Ferlita	15,778	37.14%
Total votes		42,486	100.00%
