= Jane Castor =

American politician and former police chief

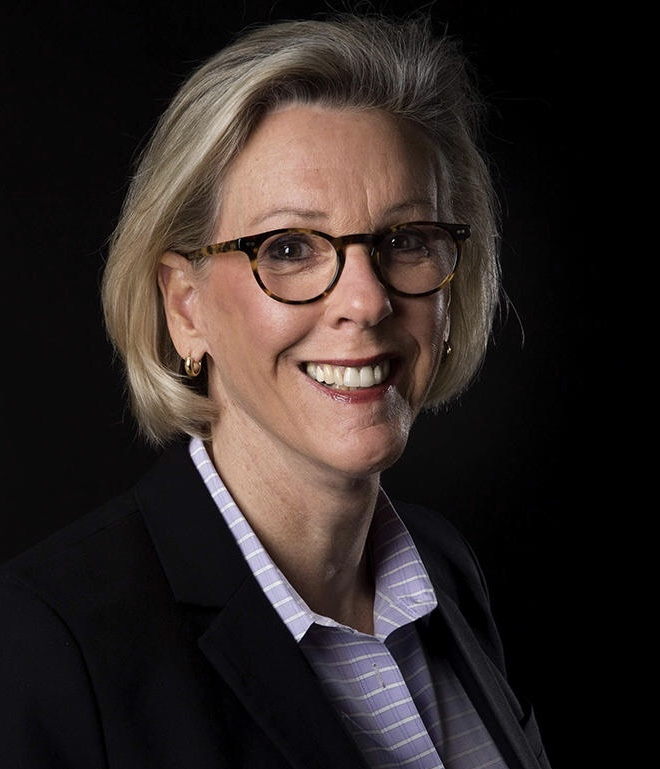
- Castor in 2012

59th Mayor of Tampa
- Incumbent
- Assumed office May 1, 2019
- Preceded by: Bob Buckhorn

10th Chief of the Tampa Police Department
- In office September 30, 2009 – May 8, 2015
- Appointed by: Pam Iorio
- Preceded by: Stephen Hogue
- Succeeded by: Eric Ward

Personal details
- Born: December 7, 1960 (age 65) Tampa, Florida, U.S.
- Party: Republican (before 2015); Democratic (2015–present)
- Domestic partners: Melanie Bevan (2002–2008); Ana Cruz (2009–present)
- Children: 2
- Education: University of Tampa (BS); Troy University (MPA)
- Police career
- Department: Tampa Police Department
- Service years: 1984–2015

Jane Castor (born December 7, 1960) is an American politician and former police officer serving as the 59th mayor of Tampa, Florida.

She was the first woman and first openly gay person to serve as Chief of Police of the Tampa Police Department from 2009 to 2015 and the first openly gay person to be elected Mayor of Tampa.

== Early life and education ==
Castor attended Chamberlain High School in Tampa where she excelled in sports and graduated in 1977. Castor attended the University of Tampa, where she played volleyball and basketball while earning a degree in criminology. Castor was inducted into the University of Tampa's Athletic Hall of Fame following her record-breaking performance on the women's basketball and volleyball teams. She graduated in 1981. She got her Master of Public Administration from Troy State University by attending classes at MacDill Air Force Base. She also attended the FBI National Academy.

== Career ==
=== Police chief ===
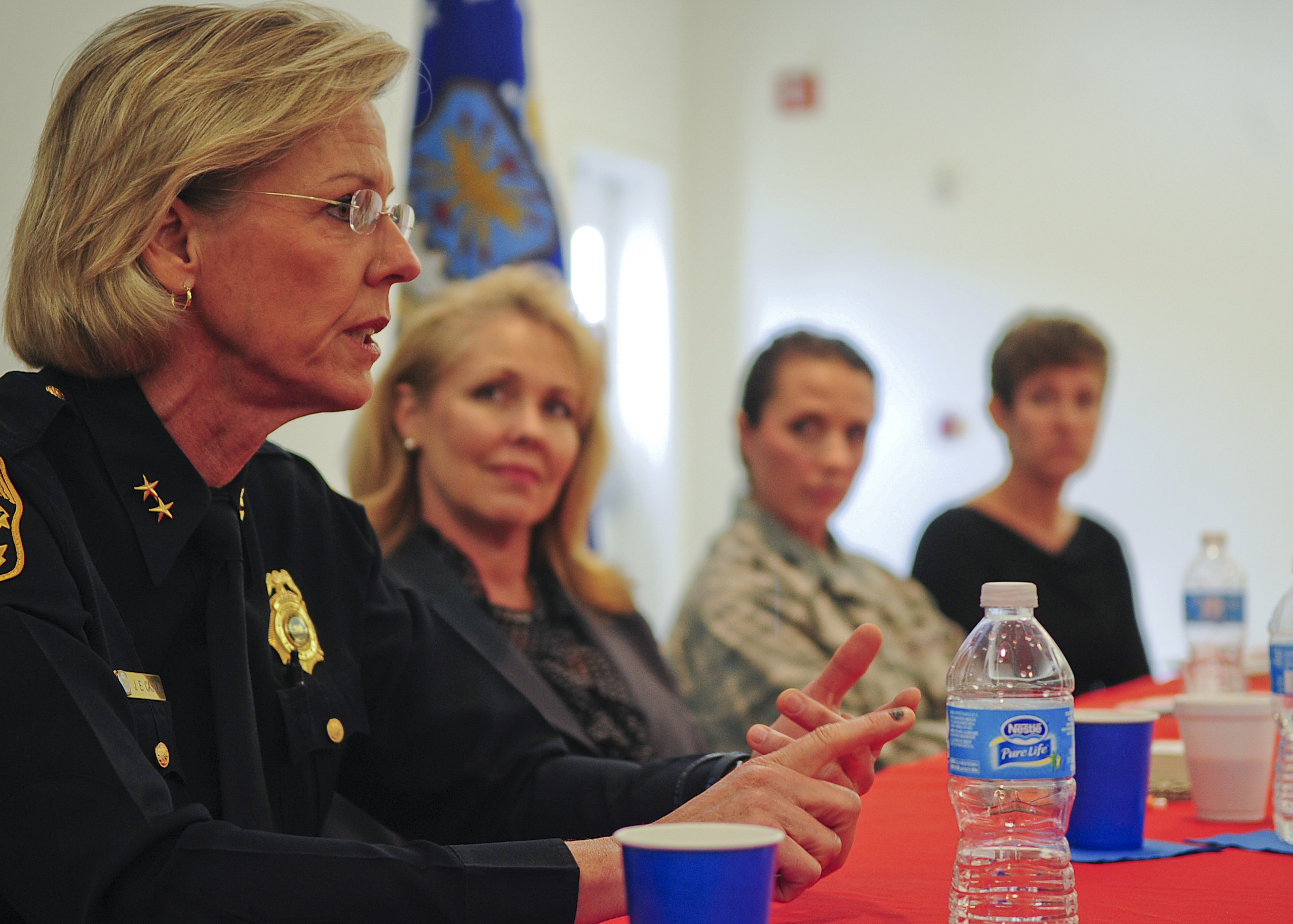
Jane Castor at a forum in 2012

In 1984, at age 24 and upon graduating from the University of Tampa, Castor joined the Tampa Police Department, where she served for 31 years. She became assistant chief in 2005. She was appointed as chief in 2009 and served until her retirement in 2015. Her tenure included a controversy over the targeting of African American cyclists for stops, searches, and tickets. A no-knock search warrant based on bad intel from a criminal informant resulted in the killing of Jason Westcott in 2014.

=== Mayor ===
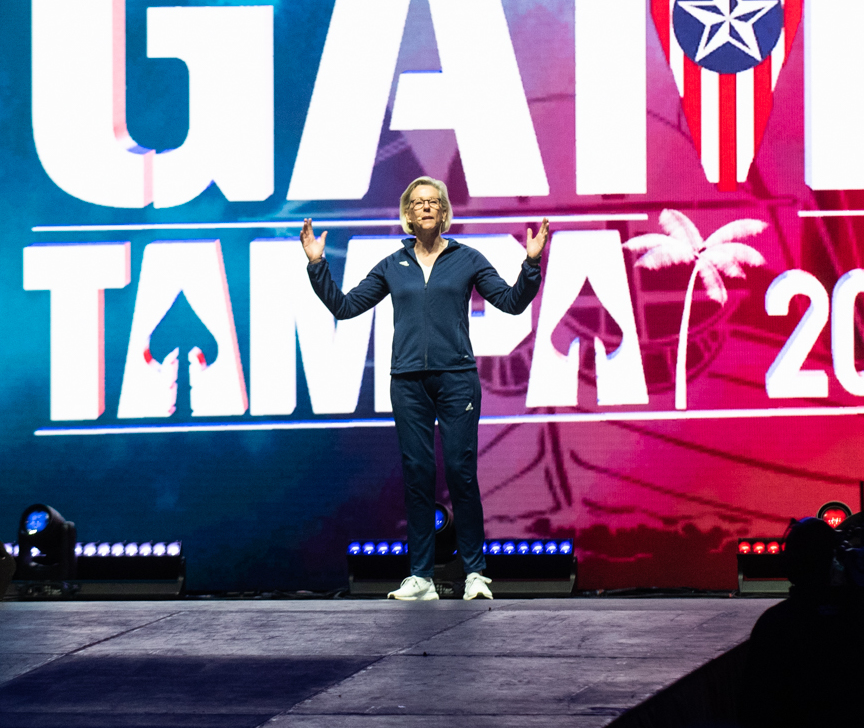
Castor speaking at the opening ceremonies of the 2019 Warrior Games

Castor was a member of the Republican Party until 2015 when she became a member of the Democratic Party.

In 2016, it was speculated that Castor would be a mayoral candidate in Tampa. In April 2018, she officially announced her candidacy. In the 2019 Tampa mayoral election, held on March 5, 2019, Castor led all candidates, garnering 48.0% of the vote. In the runoff election held on April 23, she defeated David Straz with 73% of the vote compared to Straz's 27%. She is the city's first openly lesbian mayor. She is the eighth openly gay mayor in Florida. In 2019, Castor announced that her salary would be in Bitcoin.

In 2019, Jane Castor established Transforming Tampa's Tomorrow, a strategic plan "centered around strengthening community-centric services, enhancing workforce development, increasing housing affordability, improving transportation, and fostering sustainability and resilience".

==== COVID-19 policies ====
During the COVID-19 pandemic, the city of Tampa offered transportation for people on Medicaid to get the COVID-19 vaccine at no cost.

Also during the pandemic, Tampa hosted Super Bowl LV on February 7, 2021. Twenty-two thousand spectators were allowed to attend the Super Bowl, instead of the total capacity of 75,000. During the week of the Super Bowl, the city enforced a face mask ordinance inside bars. Castor signed an executive order mandating the use of face coverings outdoors in areas downtown and near the stadium designated for events tied to the Super Bowl.

On August 24, 2021, Castor announced that Tampa City employees had until September 30, 2021, to be fully vaccinated, or to show a valid medical or religious reason as to why they cannot. Castor also noted that employees who are not vaccinated after September 30, 2021, will be required to wear an N-95 mask and take a COVID-19 test once a week.

==== Climate change policy ====
In June 2023, Castor announced a Climate Action and Equity Plan. The plan focuses on reducing carbon emissions and building climate-ready infrastructure.

==== Police policy ====
Castor introduced written procedures which would require members of the Tampa Police Department to intervene if they witness another officer utilizing excessive force. Castor also created a task force composed of 40 community members. Their goal is to review the current police habits and see what they can change and improve upon.

== Personal life ==
In August 2023, Castor found 70 pounds (32 kg) of cocaine during a family fishing trip. The drugs were turned in to authorities and were estimated to be worth $1.1 million.

Jane is not related to Kathy Castor, the U.S. representative for much of Tampa since 2007.

Political offices
Preceded by Bob Buckhorn	Mayor of Tampa; 2019–present	Incumbent
