= R. Ed Blackburn Jr. =

American politician (1912–1997)

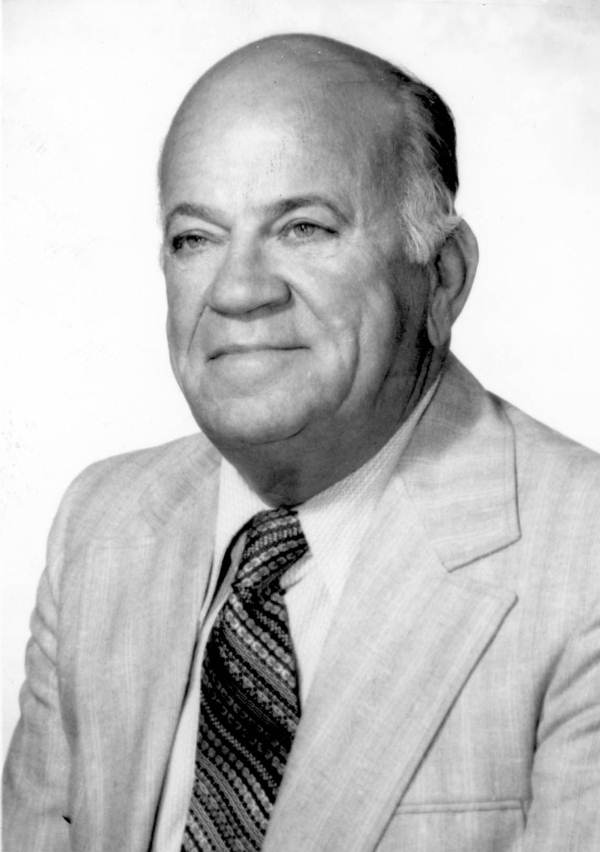
- Blackburn in 1974

Member of the Florida House of Representatives from the 60th district
- In office 1968–1972
- Preceded by: Robert Trask Mann
- Succeeded by: Roger H. Wilson

Member of the Florida House of Representatives from the 64th district
- In office 1972–1978
- Preceded by: Julian Lane
- Succeeded by: Malcolm Beard

Personal details
- Born: December 5, 1912 Tampa, Florida, U.S.
- Died: December 9, 1997 (aged 85) Tallahassee, Florida, U.S.
- Party: Democratic

R. Ed Blackburn Jr. (December 5, 1912 – December 9, 1997) was an American politician. He served as a Democratic member for the 60th and 64th district of the Florida House of Representatives.

== Life and career ==
Blackburn was born in Tampa, Florida.

In 1968, Blackburn was elected to represent the 60th district of the Florida House of Representatives, succeeding Robert Trask Mann. He served until 1972, when he was succeeded by Roger H. Wilson. In the same year, he was elected to represent the 64th district, succeeding Julian Lane. He served until 1978, when he was succeeded by Malcolm Beard.

Blackburn died in December 1997 in Tallahassee, Florida, at the age of 85.
