= 1995 Tampa mayoral election =

- March 7, 1995
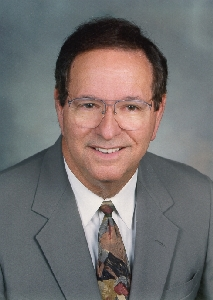

Candidate	Dick A. Greco	Jan Platt
Party	Nonpartisan	Nonpartisan
Popular vote	29,175	14,188
Percentage	66.35%	32.27%
Mayor before election
Sandra Freedman
Nonpartisan
Elected mayor
Dick A. Greco
Nonpartisan

The 1995 Tampa mayoral election took place on March 7, 1995. Incumbent Mayor Sandra Freedman was term-limited and unable to run for re-election to a third full consecutive term. Former Mayor Dick A. Greco, who had previously served from 1967 to 1974, and County Commissioner Jan Platt ran to succeed her. Greco defeated Platt by a wide margin, receiving 66 percent of the vote to her 32 percent.

== Candidates ==
- Dick A. Greco, former mayor
- Jan Platt, former Hillsborough County commissioner
- Edward T. Young, businessman

== Results ==
1995 Tampa mayoral election
Party	Candidate	Votes	%
Nonpartisan	Dick A. Greco	29,175	66.35%
Nonpartisan	Jan Platt	14,188	32.27%
Nonpartisan	Edward T. Young	610	1.39%
Total votes		43,973	100.00%
