= 1955 Tampa mayoral election =

- October 11, 1955

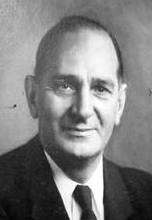

Candidate	Curtis Hixon	Nick Nuccio	Stu Phillips
Party	Nonpartisan	Nonpartisan	Nonpartisan
Popular vote	25,412	16,551	6,374
Percentage	52.57%	34.24%	13.19%
Mayor before election
Curtis Hixon
Nonpartisan
Elected mayor
Curtis Hixon
Nonpartisan

The 1955 Tampa mayoral election was held on October 11, 1955. This was the first election after the abolition of the White Municipal Party, a white supremacist organization which controlled city elections in Tampa as a quasi-private, quasi-public entity from 1910 to 1953.

Incumbent Mayor Curtis Hixon ran for re-election to a fourth term. He was challenged by County Commissioner Nick Nuccio and Stu Phillips, a member of the City Board of Representatives. Hixon defeated both candidates by a wide margin, winning 53 percent of the vote to Nuccio's 34 percent and Phillips's 13 percent, avoiding the need for a runoff election. However, Hixon died prior to the end of his fourth term, triggering a special election in 1956.

== Candidates ==
- Curtis Hixon, incumbent mayor
- Nick Nuccio, Hillsborough County commissioner
- Stu Phillips, member of the City Board of Representatives

== Results ==
1955 Tampa mayoral election
Party	Candidate	Votes	%
Nonpartisan	Curtis Hixon (inc.)	25,412	52.57%
Nonpartisan	Nick Nuccio	16,551	34.24%
Nonpartisan	Stu Phillips	6,374	13.19%
Total votes		48,337	100.00%
