= 1956 Tampa mayoral special election =

- September 11, 1956; September 25, 1956
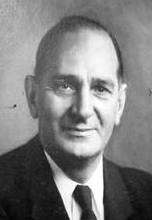

Candidate	Nick Nuccio	J. L. Young, Jr.
First round	14,378; 32.49%	16,178; 36.56%
Runoff	23,624; 50.13%	23,499; 49.87%
Candidate	W. Harion Henry	Jim Fair
First round	11,443; 25.86%	2,252; 5.09%
Runoff	Eliminated	Eliminated
Mayor before election
J. L. Young, Jr.
Nonpartisan
Elected mayor
Nick Nuccio
Nonpartisan

The 1956 Tampa mayoral special election took place on September 25, 1956, following a primary election on September 11, 1956. Mayor Curtis Hixon, who was re-elected to a fourth term in 1955, died on May 21, 1956. The chairman of the City Board of Representatives, J. L. Young, Jr., became mayor following Hixon's death. Young ran in the special election to serve out the remainder of Hixon's term. He was challenged by County Commissioner Nick Nuccio, who had unsuccessfully challenged Hixon in the previous year's election, and Justice of the Peace W. Harion Hendry.

In the primary election, Young placed first, winning 37 percent of the vote. Nuccio placed second with 32 percent of the vote and they both advanced to the general election. Nuccio narrowly defeated Young, winning 50.1 percent of the vote to Young's 49.9 percent, a margin of 125 votes. The initial count had Nuccio leading Young by 325 votes, and Young requested a recount, which revealed a tabulation error that cut Nuccio's lead by 200 votes but nonetheless upheld his victory.

== Primary election ==
=== Candidates ===
- Jim Fair, operator of a discount house
- W. Harion Hendry, justice of the peace
- Nick Nuccio, Hillsborough county commissioner, 1955 candidate for mayor
- J. L. Young, Jr., incumbent mayor

==== Disqualified ====
- W. B. "Bill" Haggerty, cold storage executive and former member of the City Board of Elections

==== Declined ====
- Anthony Schleman, Hillsborough County tax assessor

=== Results ===
1956 Tampa mayoral special primary election
Party	Candidate	Votes	%
Nonpartisan	J. L. Young, Jr. (inc.)	16,178	36.56%
Nonpartisan	Nick Nuccio	14,378	32.49%
Nonpartisan	W. Harion Hendry	11,443	25.86%
Nonpartisan	Jim Fair	2,252	5.09%
Total votes		48,337	100.00%

== General election ==
=== Results ===
1956 Tampa mayoral special general election
Party	Candidate	Votes	%
Nonpartisan	Nick Nuccio	23,624	50.13%
Nonpartisan	J. L. Young, Jr. (inc.)	23,499	49.87%
Total votes		47,123	100.00%
