= Robert Trask Mann =

American judge and politician

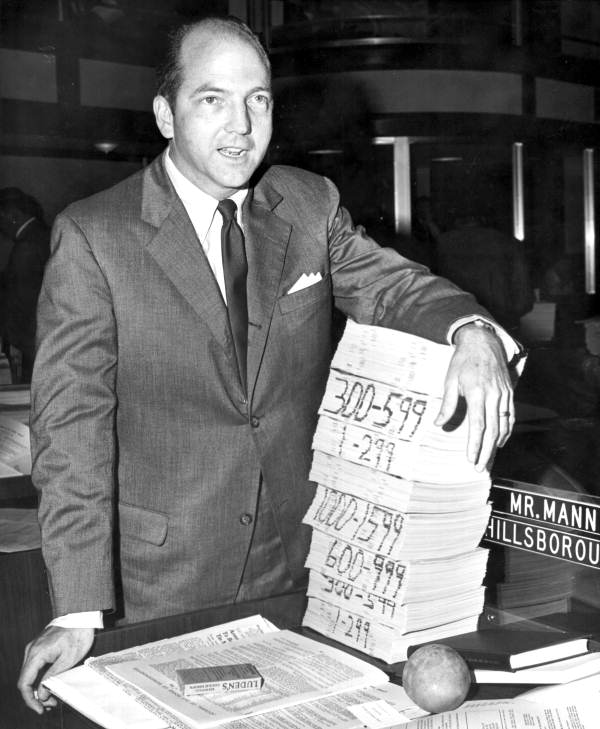
- Mann in 1965

Member of the Florida House of Representatives from Hillsborough County
- In office 1957–1967

Member of the Florida House of Representatives from the 60th district
- In office 1967–1968
- Preceded by: District established
- Succeeded by: R. Ed Blackburn Jr.

Judge of the Florida Second District Court of Appeal
- In office 1968–1974

Personal details
- Born: June 5, 1924 Tarpon Springs, Florida, U.S.
- Died: February 26, 2002 (aged 77)
- Party: Democratic
- Education: University of Florida; George Washington University; Harvard University; Yale University; Stetson University
- Occupation: Judge

Robert Trask Mann (June 5, 1924 – February 26, 2002) was an American judge and politician. He served as a Democratic member for the 60th district of the Florida House of Representatives.

== Life and career ==
Mann was born in Tarpon Springs, Florida. He attended Tarpon Springs High School, the University of Florida, George Washington University, Harvard University, Yale University and Stetson University.

In 1957, Mann was elected to the Florida House of Representatives. In 1967, he was elected as the first representative of the newly-established 60th district. Mann resigned in 1968 and was succeeded by R. Ed Blackburn Jr. In the same year, he was elected to serve as a judge for the Florida Second District Court of Appeal, serving until 1974.

Mann died in February 2002, at the age of 77.
