= 2003 Tampa mayoral election =

- March 2, 2003 (first-round); March 25, 2003 (runoff)
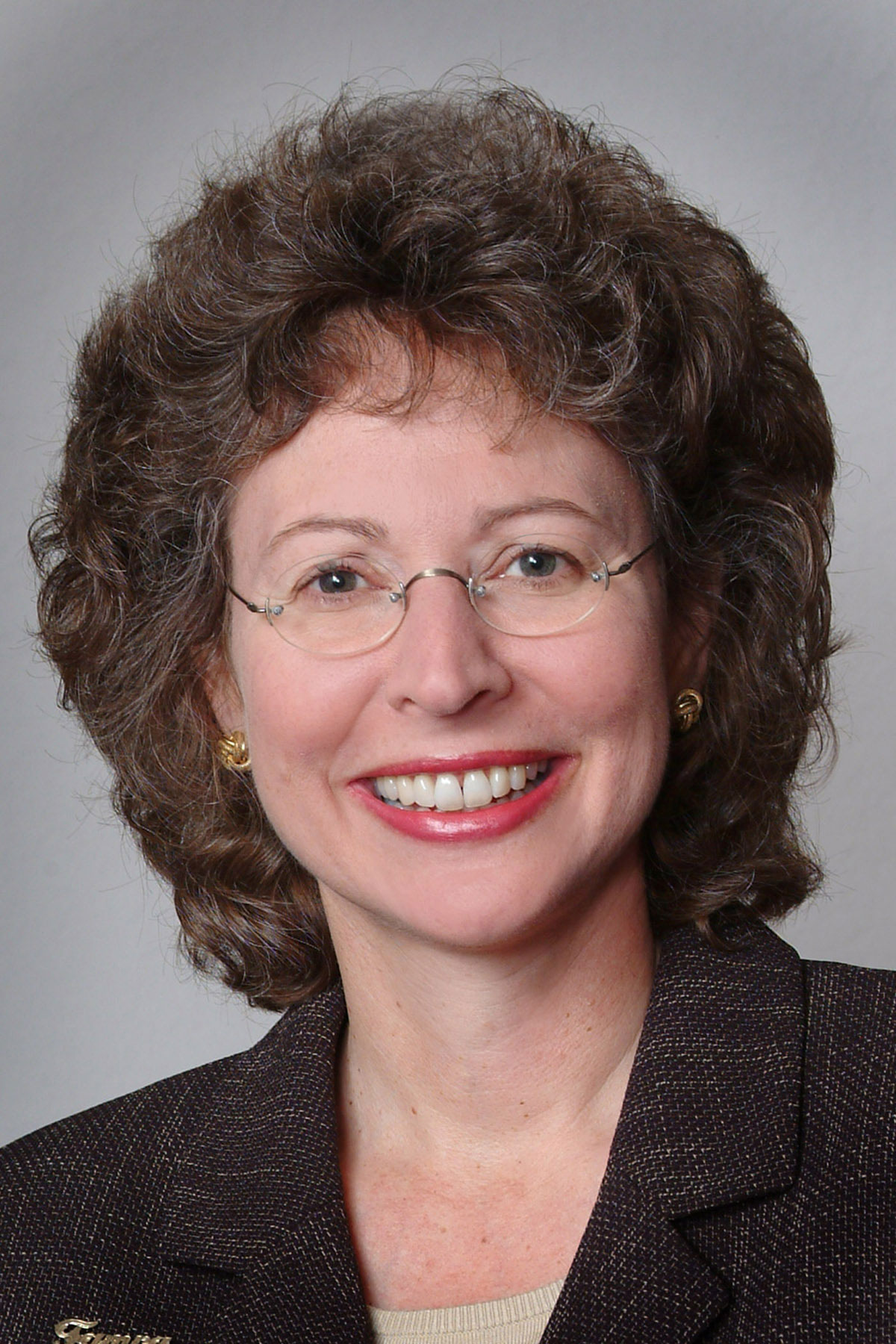

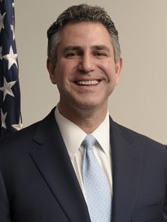

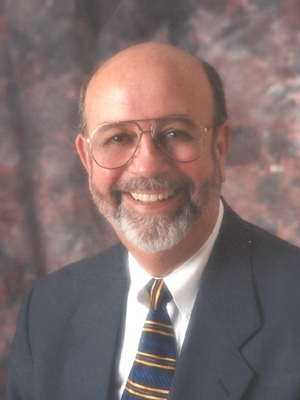
Candidate	Pam Iorio	Frank Sánchez
First round	23,161; 46.00%	10,354; 20.56%
Runoff	28,492; 64.01%	16,023; 35.99%
Candidate	Bob Buckhorn	Charlie Miranda
First round	9,668; 19.20%	6,767; 13.44%
Runoff	Eliminated	Eliminated
Mayor before election
Dick A. Greco
Nonpartisan
Elected mayor
Pam Iorio
Nonpartisan

The 2003 Tampa mayoral election took place on March 25, 2003, following a primary election on March 2, 2003.

Incumbent Mayor Dick Greco was term-limited and was barred from seeking a third consecutive term. A crowded race emerged to succeed Greco, with County Supervisor of Elections Pam Iorio emerging as the frontrunner. She placed first in the primary election by a wide margin, winning 46 percent of the vote, and advanced to the general election against Frank Sánchez, a former aide to President Bill Clinton, who narrowly beat out City Councilmember Bob Buckhorn for second place, 21–19 percent. In the general election, Iorio defeated Sánchez by a wide margin, winning 64 percent to Sánchez's 36 percent.

== Primary election ==
=== Candidates ===
- Donald B. Ardell, triathlete and wellness expert
- Bob Buckhorn, city councilmember
- Pam Iorio, Hillsborough County supervisor of elections
- Charlie Miranda, city council chairman
- Frank Sánchez, business consultant, former aide to President Bill Clinton

==== Dropped out ====
- F. Dennis Alvarez, former chief judge of the 13th Judicial Circuit
- Chris Hart, Hillsborough County commissioner

=== Polling ===
Poll source	Date(s) administered	Sample size (Note: Key: A – all adults RV – registered voters LV – likely voters CV – certain voters V – unclear)	Margin of error	Pam Iorio	Frank Sánchez	Bob Buckhorn	Charlie Miranda	Other / Undecided
SurveyUSA	February 28–March 2, 2003	539 (CV)	± 4.3%	41%	20%	20%	15%	3%

=== Results ===
2003 Tampa mayoral primary election
Party	Candidate	Votes	%
Nonpartisan	Pam Iorio	23,161	46.00%
Nonpartisan	Frank Sánchez	10,354	20.56%
Nonpartisan	Bob Buckhorn	9,668	19.20%
Nonpartisan	Charlie Miranda	6,767	13.44%
Nonpartisan	Donald B. Ardell	353	0.70%
Write-in		50	0.10%
Total votes		50,353	100.00%

== General election ==
=== Polling ===
Poll source	Date(s) administered	Sample size	Margin of error	Pam Iorio	Frank Sánchez	Other / Undecided
SurveyUSA	March 21–23, 2003	458 (CV)	± 4.5%	64%	34%	2%

=== Results ===
2003 Tampa mayoral general election
Party	Candidate	Votes	%
Nonpartisan	Pam Iorio	28,492	64.01%
Nonpartisan	Frank Sánchez	16,023	35.99%
Total votes		44,515	100.00%
