= 1967 Tampa mayoral election =

- September 12, 1967; September 26, 1967
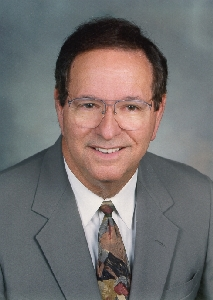

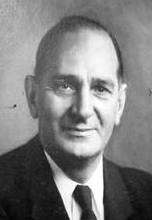

| Candidate | Dick A. Greco | Nick Nuccio |
| First round | 16,444; 28.94% | 13,812; 24.31% |
| Runoff | 36,620; 57.69% | 25,393; 42.31% |
| Candidate | Rudy Rodriguez | Jim Fair |
| First round | 11,131; 19.59% | 9,161; 16.12% |
| Runoff | Eliminated | Eliminated |
Mayor before election
Nick Nuccio
Nonpartisan
Elected mayor
Dick A. Greco
Nonpartisan

The 1967 Tampa mayoral election took place on September 26, 1967, following a primary election on September 12, 1967. Incumbent Mayor Nick Nuccio ran for re-election to a second consecutive term. Nuccio faced a crowded field of competitors, including City Councilmembers Dick A. Greco, Conrad Johnston, and Doug West; County Commissioner Rudy Rodriguez; and perennial candidate Jim Fair. In the primary election, Greco took first place, winning 29 percent of the vote, while Nuccio won 24 percent. Both advanced to the general election, where Greco defeated Nuccio by a wide margin, winning 58 percent of the vote to Nuccio's 42 percent.

== Primary election ==
=== Candidates ===
- Ed Blackburn, Jr., Hillsborough County sheriff
- Guy A. Burnett, Jr., wholesale furniture executive
- Jim Fair, perennial candidate
- Julian Lane, incumbent mayor
- Nick Nuccio, Hillsborough County commissioner, former mayor

=== Results ===
1967 Tampa mayoral primary election
| Party | Candidate | Votes | % |
|---|---|---|---|
| Nonpartisan | Dick A. Greco | 16,444 | 28.94% |
| Nonpartisan | Nick Nuccio (inc.) | 13,812 | 24.31% |
| Nonpartisan | Rudy Rodriguez | 11,131 | 19.59% |
| Nonpartisan | Jim Fair | 9,161 | 16.12% |
| Nonpartisan | W. D. "Doug" West | 3,649 | 6.42% |
| Nonpartisan | Conrad F. Johnston | 2,622 | 4.61% |
| Total votes | | 56,819 | 100.00% |

== General election ==
=== Results ===
1967 Tampa mayoral general election
| Party | Candidate | Votes | % |
|---|---|---|---|
| Nonpartisan | Dick A. Greco | 34,620 | 57.69% |
| Nonpartisan | Nick Nuccio (inc.) | 25,393 | 42.31% |
| Total votes | | 60,013 | 100.00% |
