= Paul Danahy =

American politician (1928–2022)

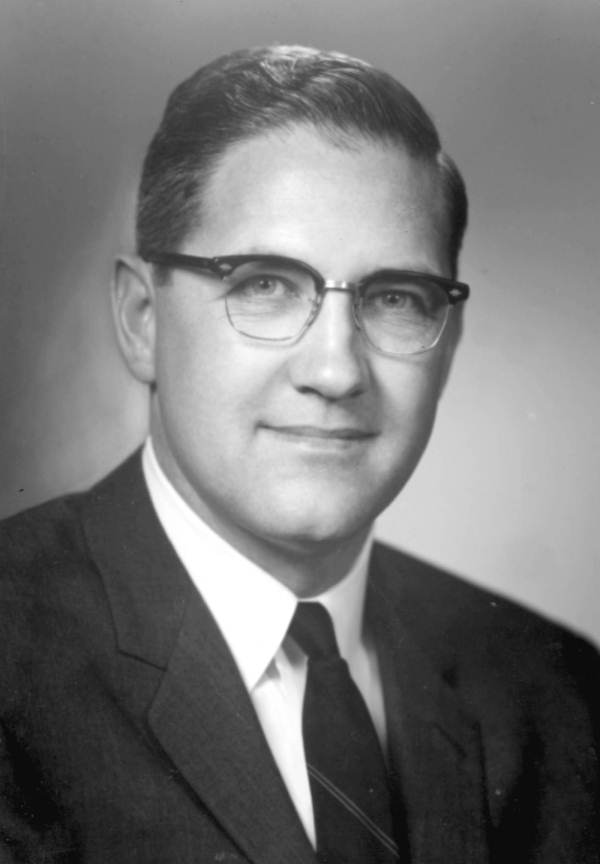

Member of the Florida House of Representatives from the 67th district
- In office 1966–1974
- Succeeded by: Ray Knopke

Personal details
- Born: April 19, 1928 Hopkinton, Massachusetts, U.S.
- Died: February 1, 2022 (aged 93) Tampa, Florida, U.S.
- Party: Democratic
- Education: University of Tampa, University of Florida
- Occupation: attorney, judge

Paul William Danahy Jr. (April 19, 1928 – February 1, 2022) was an American politician and judge from the state of Florida. He served in the Florida House of Representatives from 1967 to 1974, representing the 67th district. He was later a judge on the Florida District Court of Appeals. Danahy died in Tampa, Florida on February 1, 2022, at the age of 93.

Danahy was born in Hopkinton, Massachusetts. He grew up in Hopkinton. He was accepted to Boston College. He then received a basketball scholarship from University of Tampa where he graduated in 1951. He received his law degree from University of Florida in 1957 and was admitted to the Florida bar. He served in the United States Army and the United States Marine Corps. Danahy lived in Tampa, Florida with his wife and family.
