= Roger H. Wilson =

American politician

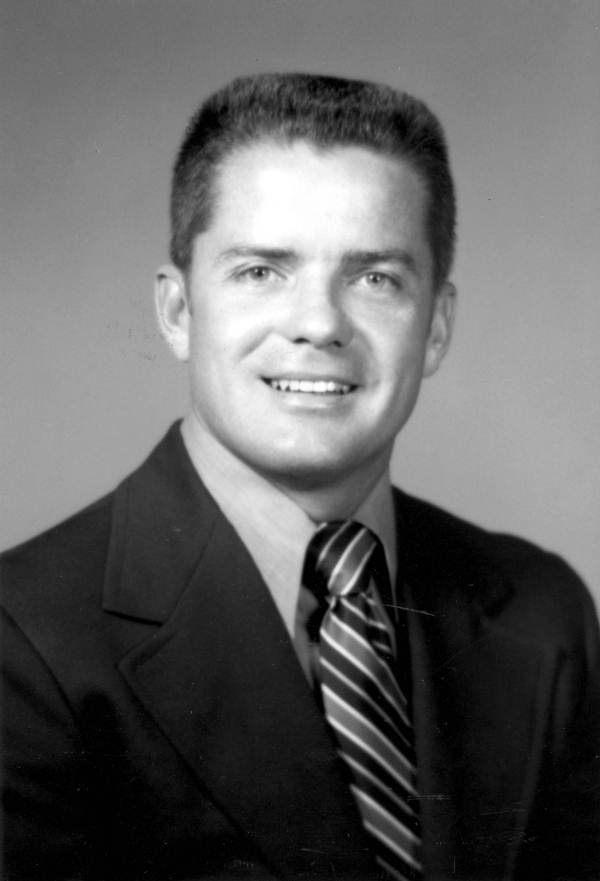

Member of the Florida House of Representatives
- In office 1968–1976

Personal details
- Born: February 24, 1937 (age 89) Brooklyn, New York
- Party: Republican

Roger H. Wilson (born February 24, 1937) is an American politician in the state of Florida.

Wilson was born in New York and came to Florida in 1959. He attended Florida State University and works in the insurance business. He served in the Florida House of Representatives from 1968 to 1976 for District 48 and District 60. He is a member of the Republican Party.
