= 1963 Malayan local elections =

Elections for local government office in Malaya

The local elections were held in Malaysia in 1963.

== City council election ==
=== George Town ===
Date: Electorate: Turnout:
Wards	Elected councillor	Elected party	Votes	Majority	Opponent(s)	Party	Votes
?
Jelutong	1.						
Kelawei	1.						
Sungei Pinang	1.						
Tanjong East	1.						
Tanjong West	1.						

== Municipal election ==
=== Kuala Lumpur ===
Date: Electorate: Turnout:
Wards	Elected councillor	Elected party	Votes	Majority	Opponent(s)	Party	Votes	Spoilt votes
?
Bangsar	1.							
Imbi	1.							
Petaling	1.							
Sentul	1.							

=== Malacca ===
Date: Electorate: Turnout:
Wards	Elected councillor	Elected party	Votes	Majority	Opponent(s)	Party	Votes	Spoilt votes
?
Bukit China	1.							
Fort	1.							
Mata Kuching	1.							
Tranquerah	1.							

== Town councils election ==
=== Alor Star ===
Date: Electorate: Turnout:
Wards	Elected councillor	Elected party	Votes	Majority	Opponent(s)	Party	Votes
?
Kampong	1.						
Pekan	1.						
Seberang	1.						

=== Bandar Maharani, Muar ===
Date: Electorate: Turnout:
Wards	Elected councillor	Elected party	Votes	Majority	Opponent(s)	Party	Votes
?
Maharani	1.						
Parit Stongkat	1.						
Sultan Ibrahim	1.						

=== Bandar Penggaram, Batu Pahat ===
Date: Electorate: Turnout:
Wards	Elected councillor	Elected party	Votes	Majority	Opponent(s)	Party	Votes
?
Gunong Soga	1.						
Jalan Sultanah	1.						
Kampong Petani	1.						

=== Bukit Mertajam ===
Date: Electorate: Turnout:
Wards	Elected councillor	Elected party	Votes	Majority	Opponent(s)	Party	Votes
?
	1.						
	1.						

=== Butterworth ===
Date: Electorate: Turnout:
Wards	Elected councillor	Elected party	Votes	Majority	Opponent(s)	Party	Votes
?
	1.						
	1.						

=== Ipoh-Menglembu ===
Date: Electorate: Turnout:
Wards	Elected councillor	Elected party	Votes	Majority	Opponent(s)	Party	Votes
?
Green Town	1.						
Menglembu	1.						
Pasir Puteh	1.						
Silibin	1.						

=== Johore Bahru ===
Date: Electorate: Turnout:
Wards	Elected councillor	Elected party	Votes	Majority	Opponent(s)	Party	Votes
?
Ayer Molek	1.						
Nong Chik	1.						
Tampoi	1.						
Tebrau	1.						

=== Kampar ===
Date: Electorate: Turnout:
Wards	Elected councillor	Elected party	Votes	Majority	Opponent(s)	Party	Votes
?
Central	1.						
North	1.						
South	1.						

=== Klang ===
Date: Electorate: Turnout:
Wards	Elected councillor	Elected party	Votes	Majority	Opponent(s)	Party	Votes
?
Klang North	1.						
Klang South	1.						
Port Swettenham	1.						

=== Kluang ===
Date: Electorate: Turnout:
Wards	Elected councillor	Elected party	Votes	Majority	Opponent(s)	Party	Votes
Socialist Front 7 | Alliance 4 | Independent 1
Bakar Sampah	Low Dian Hoe	Socialist Front	513	232	1. Lee Hie Siong	Alliance (MCA)	281
Dorset	1. Abdul Rahman Maskom	Alliance (UMNO)	439	212	1. Zainab Talib	Independent	227
Haji Manan	1. Tan Khim Seck	Independent	492	66	1. Tong Peow Kee	Alliance (MCA)	426
Jalan Mersing	1. Ng Ka Sik	Socialist Front	602	95	1. Loh Fook Yen	Alliance (MCA)	507
Kampong Bahru	1. Mansor Haji Salleh	Socialist Front	372	103	1. Abdul Latif Durin	Alliance (UMNO)	269
Lambak	1. Wee Lee Jin	Socialist Front	513	162	1. Tan Ngah Chin	Alliance (MCA)	351
Mengkibol	1. Mohd. Aziz Haji Awab	Alliance (UMNO)	492	246	1. Mohd. Amin Haji Abdullah	Socialist Front	246
Masjid Lama	1. Zakaria Dikon	Alliance (UMNO)	313	28	1. Zaharudin Idris	Socialist Front	285
Pekan	1. Lee Ah Leng	Socialist Front (Labour)	372	91	1. Lee Bong Heong	Alliance (MCA)	281
Sultanah	1. Siew Theng Yhoi	Alliance (MCA)	485	51	1. Lee Kaw	Independent	434
Yap Tau Sah	1. Ng Wei Siong	Socialist Front	567	395	1. Kong Eng Tow	Alliance (MCA)	172
Yap Tau Sah Timor	1. Chiu Chau Chong	Socialist Front	545	254	1. Liu Han Siong	Alliance (MCA)	291

=== Kota Bharu ===
Date: Electorate: Turnout:
Wards	Elected councillor	Elected party	Votes	Majority	Opponent(s)	Party	Votes
?
Kubang Pasu	1.						
Kota Lama	1.						
Wakaf Pasu	1.						

=== Kota Tinggi ===
Date: Electorate: Turnout:
Wards	Elected councillor	Elected party	Votes	Majority	Opponent(s)	Party	Votes
Alliance 6 | Socialist Front 2 | Independent 1
Bukit Kerajan	1. Syed Abu Bakar Abdullah	Alliance (UMNO)	139	82	Jaffar Haji Sardon	Independent	57
Jalan Besar	1. Chia Tu Siang	Independent	145	32	1. Pee Hock Chiam	Alliance (MCA)	113
Jalan Johore	1. Awang Md. Sheikh	Alliance (UMNO)	Unopposed				
Jalan Mawai	1. Yuen Kok Wah	Socialist Front	120	0 (Note: Socialist Front candidate won by drawing of lots.)	1. Lau Yan Loon	Alliance (MCA)	120
Kota Kechil Barat	1. Tan Seng Tong	Alliance (MCA)	208	102	1. Sam Sew Keong	Socialist Front	106
Kota Kechil Timor	1. Chia Ee Koh	Alliance (MCA)	Unopposed				
Sungei Kemang Selatan	1. Soo Weng Fatt	Socialist Front	162	25	1. Shaik Mohamed Tahir	Alliance (UMNO)	137
Sungei Kemang Utara	1. Omar Ahmad	Alliance (UMNO)	101	5	1. Syed Abu Bakar Jaffar	Independent	96
Tembioh	1. Kelu Ramu	Alliance (MIC)	115	40	1. Lio Ah Pau	Socialist Front	75

=== Kuala Kangsar ===
Date: Electorate: Turnout:
Wards	Elected councillor	Elected party	Votes	Majority	Opponent(s)	Party	Votes
?
Idris	1.						
Kangsar	1.						
Kenas	1.						

=== Kuala Pilah ===
Date: Electorate: Turnout:
Wards	Elected councillor	Elected party	Votes	Majority	Opponent(s)	Party	Votes
?
Bukit Temensu	1.						
Kampong Dioh	1.						
Pekan Lama	1.						

=== Kuala Trengganu ===
Date: Electorate: Turnout:
Wards	Elected councillor	Elected party	Votes	Majority	Opponent(s)	Party	Votes
?
Bukit Besar	1.						
Kuala	1.						
Ladang	1.						

=== Kuantan ===
Date: Electorate: Turnout:
Wards	Elected councillor	Elected party	Votes	Majority	Opponent(s)	Party	Votes
?
Central Town	1.						
Tanah Puteh	1.						
Telok Sisek	1.						

=== Pasir Mas ===
Date: Electorate: Turnout:
Wards	Elected councillor	Elected party
?
Lemal	1.	
Kampong Bahru	1.	
Pengkalan Pasir	1.	

=== Raub ===
Date: Electorate: Turnout:
Wards	Elected councillor	Elected party
?
Raub Australian Gold Mine	1.	
Raub Town	1.	
Sempalit	1.	
Tanjong Gadong	1.	

=== Segamat ===
Date: Electorate: Turnout:
Wards	Elected councillor	Elected party	Votes	Majority	Opponent(s)	Party	Votes
?
Buloh Kasap	1.						
Gemereh	1.						
Genuang	1.						

=== Seremban ===
Date: Electorate: Turnout:
Wards	Elected councillor	Elected party	Votes	Majority	Opponent(s)	Party	Votes
?
Lake	1.						
Lobak	1.						
Rahang	1.						
Temiang	1.						

=== Sungei Patani ===
Date: Electorate: Turnout:
Wards	Elected councillor	Elected party
?
Pekan Bahru	1.	
Pekan Lama	1.	
Rural	1.	

=== Taiping ===
Date: Electorate: Turnout:
Wards	Elected councillor	Elected party	Votes	Majority	Opponent(s)	Party	Votes	Spoilt votes
?
Assam Kumbang	1.							
Kota	1.							
Klian Pauh	1.							

=== Tanjong Malim ===
Date: Electorate: Turnout:
Wards	Elected councillor	Elected party	Votes	Majority	Opponent(s)	Party	Votes
?
Beirop	1.						
Idris	1.						
Malacca	1.						

=== Tapah ===
Date: Electorate: Turnout:
Wards	Elected councillor	Elected party	Votes	Majority	Opponent(s)	Party	Votes
?
Kampong Datoh	1.						
Station Road	1.						
Temoh Road	1.						

=== Teluk Anson ===
Date: Electorate: Turnout:
Wards	Elected councillor	Elected party	Votes	Majority	Opponent(s)	Party	Votes
?
Changkat Jong	1.						
Denison Road	1.						
Pasir Bedamar	1.						

=== Temerloh-Mentekab ===
Date: Electorate: Turnout:
Wards	Elected councillor	Elected party	Votes	Majority	Opponent(s)	Party	Votes
?
Mentekab North	1.						
Mentekab South	1.						
Temerloh North	1.						
Temerloh South	1.						
