= Dick A. Greco =

American politician

Dick Greco
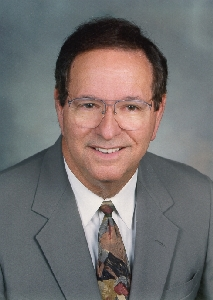

Mayor of Tampa, Florida
- In office April 1, 1995 – April 1, 2003
- Preceded by: Sandra Freedman
- Succeeded by: Pam Iorio
- In office October 3, 1967 – April 1, 1974
- Preceded by: Nick Nuccio
- Succeeded by: Richard L. Cheney

Personal details
- Born: Richard Attilio Greco; September 14, 1933 (age 93) Seminole Heights, Tampa, Florida, U.S.
- Party: Democratic
- Education: University of Tampa

Richard Attilio Greco (born September 14, 1933) is an American politician, businessman, and civic activist from Tampa, Florida.

== Early life ==
Dick Greco was born in the Ybor City neighborhood of Tampa, where his Italian-American father owned a hardware store. He graduated from Hillsborough High School and the University of Tampa where he earned a degree in Education in 1956. After college, Greco took over his father's hardware store and became increasingly active in many civic programs and organizations.

== Political career ==
In 1963, Greco decided to use his growing public profile to campaign for a seat on the Tampa city council. He won the election for District 4 and was sworn in on October 1, 1963, less than two weeks after his 30th birthday.

=== Mayor of Tampa, Part I ===
In 1967, Greco ran a successful campaign to be Tampa's youngest ever mayor at 34 years old. He was one of the youngest mayors of a major city in the United States when he was elected. He beat incumbent and fellow Ybor City native Nick Nuccio in an election that was seen as a transfer of power from one generation to the next

In his first term, Greco balanced issues such as simmering racial tensions, crime, and extremely limited tax revenue. In 1971, Greco again beat Nuccio in a mayoral election rematch, but resigned in 1974 to accept a job with the Edward J. DeBartolo Corporation, a mall development company, a career move which tripled his mayor's salary of $30,000.

=== Mayor of Tampa, Part II ===
Greco remained with the DeBartolo Corporation for 21 years, much of it spent away from Tampa. He returned to his hometown in the early 1990s and successfully re-entered Tampa politics in 1995 when he ran for and regained the mayor's office. Owing to his years in the commercial development industry, Greco pushed for many large projects, often joint ventures involving both private and public funding. Some (such as the Tampa Marriott Waterside) were widely praised, while others (such as the Centro Ybor shopping center and Raymond James Stadium) were more controversial and would cost the city budget millions of dollars over subsequent years. Despite some setbacks, Greco remained popular enough to win a second consecutive (and fourth overall) term as mayor with no opposition in 1999.

During his fourth term as mayor, Greco's administration was involved in controversy when the city's housing director, Steve LaBrake, was accused of improperly awarding city contracts and taking bribes. Despite mounting criticism, Greco refused to fire LaBrake until after the director was indicted in federal court. LaBrake eventually served time in prison for his actions. Greco was also criticized for continuing to back private redevelopment projects with city money, in several instances leaving the city with large debt repayments after developers defaulted. Due to term limits limiting Tampa mayors to two consecutive terms, he could not run again in 2003 and was succeeded by Pam Iorio.

Despite some controversy during his last years in office, Greco was still widely popular in Tampa and was the second former mayor (after Nick Nuccio) to be honored with a public statue. The statue depicts Greco sitting on a bench beside Dick Greco Plaza, a streetcar station named in his honor for his efforts to build the TECO Line Streetcar connecting Ybor City and downtown.

After leaving the mayor's office, Greco returned to the DeBartolo Corporation, which had moved its headquarters to Tampa in 1999 at his recommendation.

=== 5th run for mayor ===
In 2010, Greco announced that he would try to win an unprecedented 5th term as mayor of Tampa in 2011 when Iorio's second term expired, potentially making him both the youngest and the oldest mayor in the city's history. But though seen by local political observers as the early favorite, Greco ran third in the general election, 384 votes behind Rose Ferlita, who lost in a subsequent runoff election to Bob Buckhorn.

Political offices
Preceded by Nick Nuccio	Mayor of Tampa; 1967–1974	Succeeded by Richard L. Cheney
Preceded by Sandra Freedman	Mayor of Tampa; 1995–2003	Succeeded by Pam Iorio
