= 1963 Dallas mayoral election =

- April 2, 1963
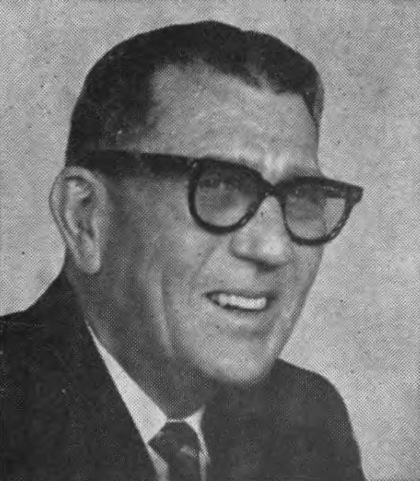

Candidate	Earle Cabell	Charles Sharp	George T. Fox, Jr.
Party	Nonpartisan	Nonpartisan	Nonpartisan
Popular vote	41,115	19,456	1,198
Percentage	66.56%	31.50%	1.94%
Mayor before election
Earle Cabell
Elected mayor
Earle Cabell

The 1963 Dallas mayoral election was held on Tuesday April 2, 1963, with incumbent Earle Cabell being re-elected with 66.6 percent of the vote. During this term of Cabell's mayoralty, President John F. Kennedy would be assassinated in Dallas on November 22, 1963. Cabell resigned as mayor on February 3, 1964, in order to run for Congress. He would go on to win the election and unseat Republican incumbent Bruce Alger.

== Results ==
1963 Dallas mayoral election
Party	Candidate	Votes	%
Nonpartisan	Earle Cabell	41,115	66.56%
Nonpartisan	Charles Sharp	19,456	31.50%
Nonpartisan	George T. Fox, Jr.	1,198	1.94%
Total votes		61,769	100%
