= Julian Lane =

American military officer and politician

Julian Barnes Lane
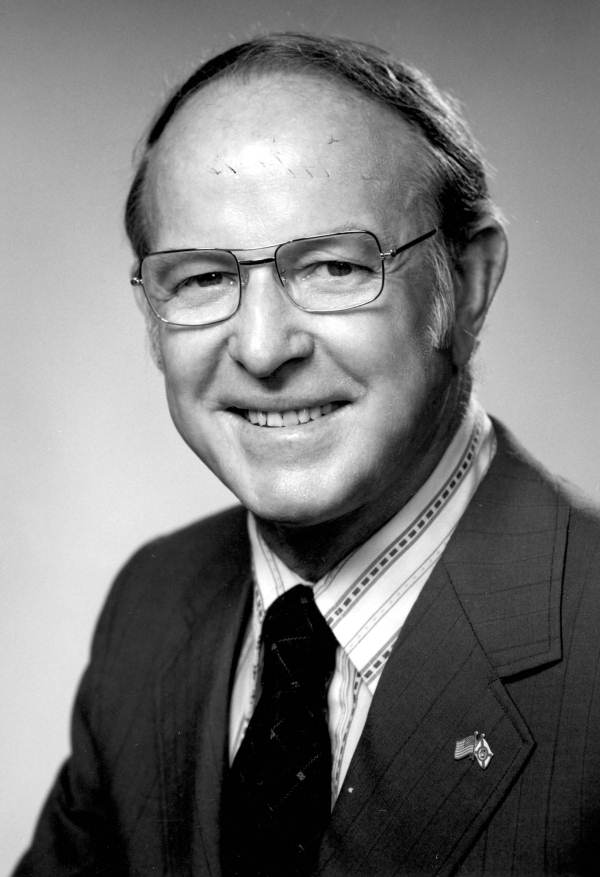
- Lane in 1972

48th Mayor of Tampa
- In office 1959–1963
- Preceded by: Nick Nuccio
- Succeeded by: Nick Nuccio

Member of the Florida House of Representatives from the 64th district
- In office 1970–1972
- Preceded by: Guy Spicola
- Succeeded by: R. Ed Blackburn Jr.

Member of the Florida Senate from the 23rd district
- In office 1972–1976
- Preceded by: Ray Knopke
- Succeeded by: Betty Castor

Personal details
- Born: October 21, 1914 Tampa, Florida
- Died: May 4, 1997 (aged 82) Tampa, Florida
- Party: Democratic
- Spouse: Frances LaMotte
- Profession: Business Executive
- Military career
- Allegiance: United States
- Branch: United States Army
- Service years: 1940–1946
- Rank: Lieutenant colonel

Julian Barnes Lane Sr. (October 21, 1914 – May 4, 1997) was the 48th mayor of Tampa, Florida, and later a member of the Florida Legislature.

== Early life and education ==
Lane was born in Tampa, Florida. He grew up in the Seminole Heights neighborhood and graduated from Hillsborough High School in Tampa. Afterward, Lane attended the University of Florida in Gainesville, Florida, where he played for coach Dutch Stanley and coach Josh Cody's Florida Gators football team from 1934 to 1936, and of which he was team captain in 1936. He was also a member of the Alpha Tau Omega fraternity (Alpha Omega chapter). Lane graduated from the University of Florida with a bachelor's degree in business administration in 1937, and was inducted into the University of Florida Athletic Hall of Fame as a "distinguished letter winner" in 1990. When he was attending the University of Florida he met his future wife, Frances LaMotte. After graduating from college, he worked for Firestone for the next three years. In December 1940, Lane married Frances LaMotte.

== Wartime service and aftermath ==
After graduating from Florida, where he was also a member of ROTC, he became a commissioned officer in the United States Army. During World War II, he was promoted to the rank of Lt. Colonel, being stationed for a time in Bournemouth, England before being discharged on February 28, 1946.

Upon returning to Tampa, he eventually became the president of the Tampa Bay Milk Producers.

During Daniel T. McCarthy's 1952 gubernatorial election run, Lane would serve as McCarthy's campaign manager in Hillsborough County.

== Political career ==
In 1959, Lane campaigned against three other candidates for mayor and defeated Nick Nuccio in a run-off election. During his term, Lane faced a depleted treasury and a city budget of thirty million dollars. The municipal hospitals were unable to pay their bills and storm sewers were desperately needed after the havoc created by Hurricane Donna. Mayor Lane enforced stricter adherence to Civil Service hiring guidelines. He closed the Clara Frye Hospital for blacks and merged its services with the Tampa Municipal Hospital. Mayor Lane helped establish the Tampa Hospital Board and removed the hospitals from the city's direct administration.

During his term of office, Julian Lane and the City Council expanded the construction of storm and sanitary sewers and the pavement of over two hundred miles of streets. Construction of a new public library building was approved and Redland Baseball Field was completed replacing Plant Field. Improvements were made along the public beach on Davis Causeway and 12.7 acres of riverfront land was purchased along the Hillsborough River. The city also began the Maryland Avenue Urban Renewal Project and built Community Centers in Interbay, West Tampa, and Forrest Hills. Mayor Lane also appointed a committee to study the proposed construction of Tampa Stadium.

The Fire Department's manpower was increased by the addition of two hundred new firemen. There were also ninety-nine new fire hydrants installed in the City. In 1961, Lane supervised the transition when the City of Port Tampa and surrounding industrial areas were annexed into the City of Tampa.

Racial segregation and integration would be a significant theme of Lane's time in office as mayor. At the end of Mayor Lane's term, in September 1963, the first black children were enrolled in traditionally white schools at Jackson Heights and Westshore Elementary Schools. On February 29, 1960 sit-ins would begin at a Woolworth's store in Downtown Tampa. After a week of sit-ins occurring at, he would respond to it by appointing a biracial committee to discuss segregation orientated issues and by September, the city would integrate lunch counters. A historical marker for the sit-ins would be revealed in May 2018. The Tampa Tribune also worked with the mayor to help ensure that integration in Tampa was as orderly as possible.

Lane was defeated for re-election in 1963 by former mayor Nuccio, whom Lane had defeated in 1959.

Lane served terms as a state representative, from 1970 to 1972, and as a state senator, from 1973 to 1976.

== Retirement and legacy ==
Julian and his wife Frances Elizabeth LaMotte (1917–1998), had 4 children – Susan LaMotte Lane, Julian B. Lane Jr., Virginia Lane, and William LaMotte Lane (d. 2012), and seven grandchildren.

He was a member of the First Presbyterian Church of Tampa.

Lane returned to Tampa to retire after his state political career. He died there in 1997; he was 82 years old. He is buried at Myrtle Hill Cemetery in Tampa.

The Julian B. Lane Riverfront Park in Tampa is named for him. It underwent an extensive renovation during Mayor Bob Buckhorn's tenure and re-opened in 2018.

== Electoral history ==
1959 Tampa mayoral election
Party	Candidate	Votes	%	±%
Nonpartisan	Julian B. Lane	37,823	47.71%	0.00%
Nonpartisan	Nick Nuccio	32,910	46.53%	−3.6%

== See also ==
- Florida Gators
- Florida Gators football, 1930–39
- List of Alpha Tau Omega brothers
- List of mayors of Tampa, Florida
- List of University of Florida alumni
- List of University of Florida Athletic Hall of Fame members

Political offices
Preceded by Nick Nuccio	Mayor of Tampa; 1959–1963	Succeeded by Nick Nuccio
