= Pat Frank (politician) =

American politician (born 1929)

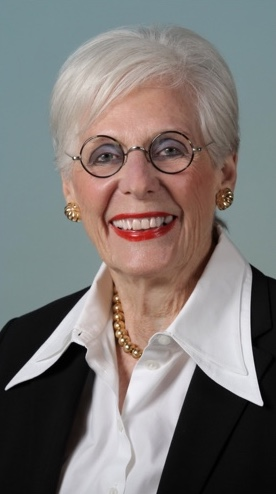

Hillsborough County Clerk of Court and Comptroller
- In office January 4, 2005 – January 5, 2021
- Preceded by: Richard Ake
- Succeeded by: Cindy Stuart

Member of the Hillsborough County Commission from the 7th district
- In office November 17, 1998 – November 16, 2004
- Preceded by: Joe Chillura
- Succeeded by: Mark Sharpe

Member of the Florida Senate from the 23rd district
- In office November 7, 1978 – November 8, 1988
- Preceded by: Betty Castor
- Succeeded by: Helen Gordon Davis

Member of the Florida House of Representatives from the 67th district
- In office November 2, 1976 – November 7, 1978
- Preceded by: Ray Knopke
- Succeeded by: Elvin Martinez

Personal details
- Born: Pat Collier; November 12, 1929 (age 96) Cleveland, Ohio, U.S.
- Party: Democratic
- Spouse: Richard Frank (died 2012)
- Children: 3
- Education: University of Florida (BS, BA); Georgetown University
- Occupation: Business economist

Pat Frank (née Collier; born November 12, 1929) is a Democratic politician from Florida who served as a member of the Florida House of Representatives from the 67th district from 1976 to 1978 and as a member of the Florida Senate from the 23rd district from 1978 to 1988. She later served on the Hillsborough County Commission from 1998 to 2004 and as Hillsborough County Clerk of Court and Comptroller from 2005 to 2021.

Frank was born in Ohio and came to Florida in 1935. She attended the University of Florida and Georgetown University School of Law. A business economist, she served in the Florida State Senate from 1979 to 1988, as a member of the Democratic Party (23rd district). She also served in the Florida House of Representatives from 1976 to 1978. She was elected to her fourth term as Clerk of the Court in Hillsborough County, Florida, (Tampa), where she has resided since 1961.

She was among the first class of women admitted to Georgetown University School of Law, where she met her husband, the late Judge Richard Harlan Frank, Second District Court of Appeals, (Florida). Judge Frank and Pat Collier met while in law school in a contracts class, where they later decided, "to make one of their own", (as Pat Frank phrased it). They were married 93 days after meeting in that Contracts class, on December 22, 1951, at the Washington National Cathedral, in Washington, D.C.
