= 1963 United States gubernatorial elections =

- November 5, 1963; March 3, 1964 (LA)

2 governorships
	Majority party	Minority party
Party	Democratic	Republican
Seats before	34	16
Seats after	34	16
Seat change	Steady	Steady
Seats up	3	0
Seats won	3	0
- Democratic hold

United States gubernatorial elections were held in November 1963, in two states. Kentucky, Louisiana and Mississippi hold their gubernatorial elections in odd numbered years, every 4 years, preceding the United States presidential election year.

== Results ==
State	Incumbent	Party	Status	Opposing candidates
Kentucky	Bert Combs	Democratic	Term-limited, Democratic victory	Ned Breathitt (Democratic) 50.74% Louie Nunn (Republican) 49.26%
Louisiana (Held, March 3, 1964)	Jimmie Davis	Democratic	Term-limited, Democratic victory	John McKeithen (Democratic) 60.72% Charlton Lyons (Republican) 37.50%
Mississippi	Ross Barnett	Democratic	Term-limited, Democratic victory	Paul B. Johnson Jr. (Democratic) 61.94% Rubel Phillips (Republican) 38.06%
