= Ray Knopke =

American politician (1913–2011)

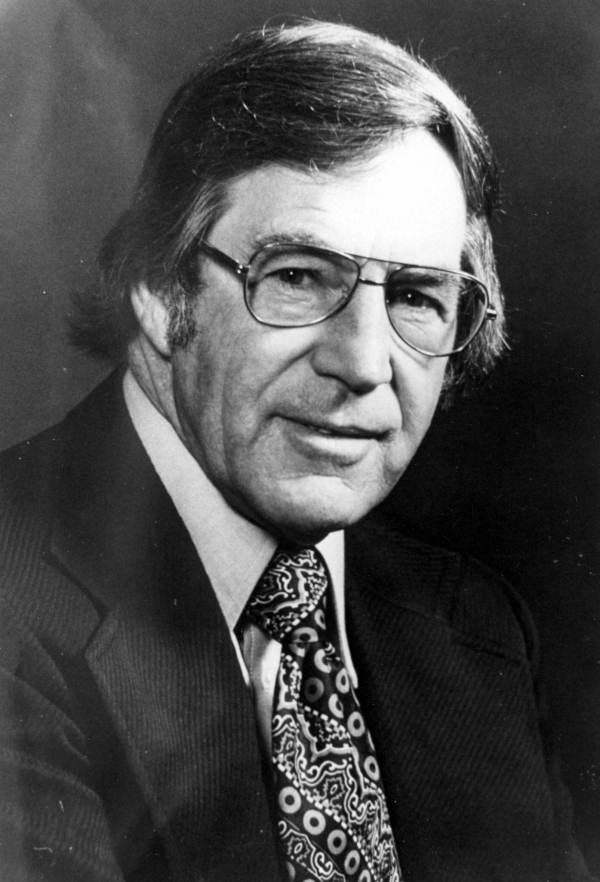
- Knopke in 1974

Member of the Florida House of Representatives from Hillsborough County
- In office 1963–1966

Member of the Florida Senate from the 23rd district
- In office 1966–1972

Member of the Florida House of Representatives from the 67th district
- In office 1974–1976
- Preceded by: Paul Danahy
- Succeeded by: Pat Frank

Personal details
- Born: December 13, 1913 Chicago, Illinois, U.S.
- Died: September 19, 2011 (aged 97)
- Party: Democratic
- Education: St. Petersburg Junior College; Ohio State University

Ray C. Knopke (December 13, 1913 – September 19, 2011) was an American politician. He served as a Democratic member for the 67th district of the Florida House of Representatives. He also served as a member for the 23rd district of the Florida Senate.

== Life and career ==
Knopke was born in Chicago, Illinois. He attended St. Petersburg Junior College and Ohio State University.

In 1963, Knopke was elected to the Florida House of Representatives, serving until 1966. In the same year, he was elected to represent the 23rd district of the Florida Senate, serving until 1972. In 1974, he was elected to represent the 67th district of the Florida House, succeeding Paul Danahy. He served until 1976, when he was succeeded by Pat Frank.

Knopke died in September 2011 in Tampa, Florida, at the age of 97.
