= 2015 Tampa mayoral election =

- March 3, 2015
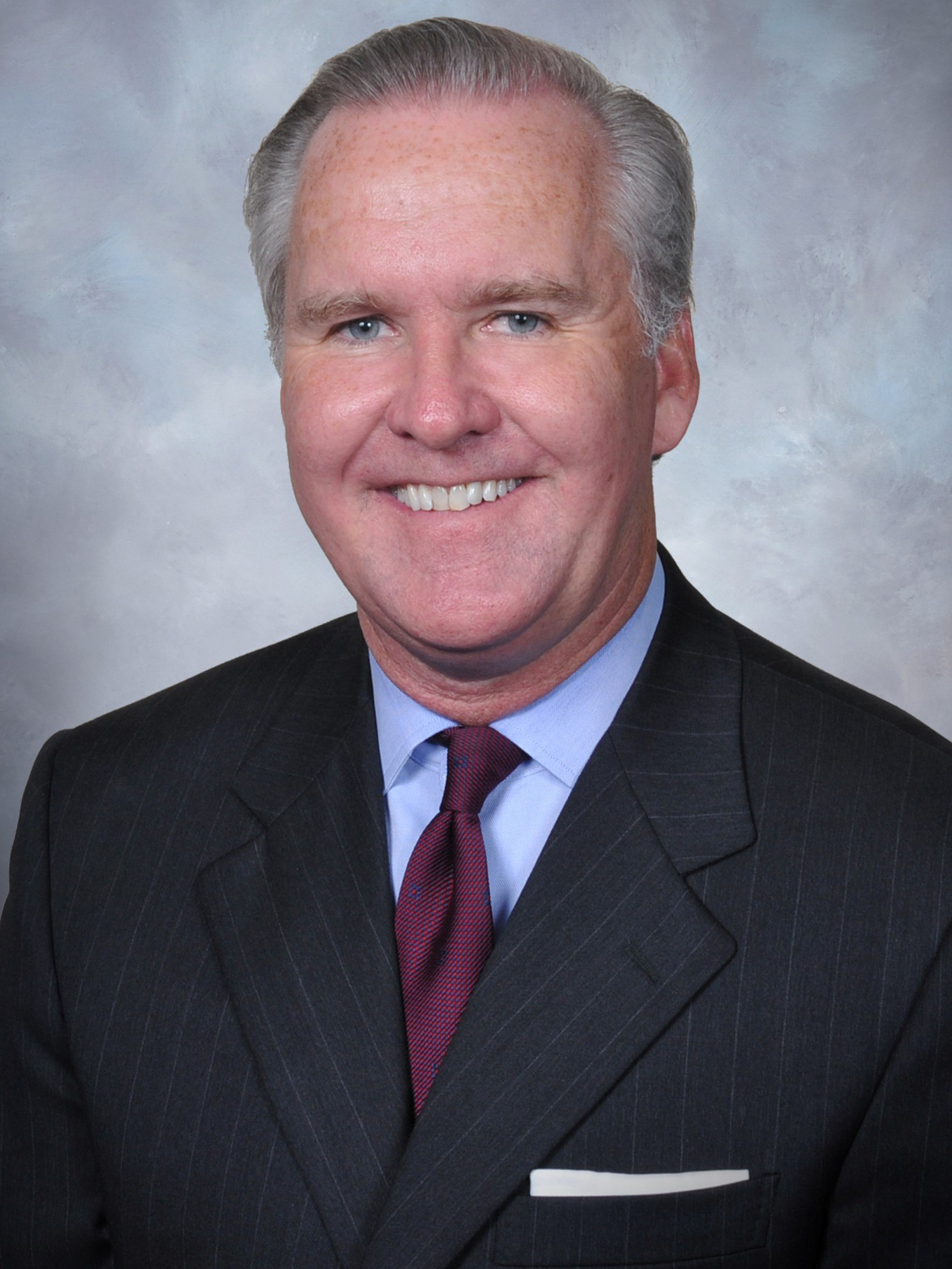
Nominee	Bob Buckhorn
Party	Nonpartisan
Popular vote	24,607
Percentage	95.91%
Mayor before election
Bob Buckhorn
Democratic
Elected mayor
Bob Buckhorn
Democratic

The 2015 Tampa mayoral election took place on March 3, 2015. Incumbent Mayor Bob Buckhorn ran for re-election to a second term. In the leadup to the filing deadline, Buckhorn raised a significant amount of money, but no big-name challengers filed. Acupuncturist Becky Rubright, who participated in Occupy protests, announced that she would challenge Buckhorn so that he would avoid going uncontested. However, Rubright dropped out on December 1, 2014, concluding that she would be unable to meet the 3,400-signature requirement to appear on the ballot. Ultimately, Buckhorn was the only candidate to appear on the ballot, though businessman Jose Vazquez, filed to run as a write-in candidate. Buckhorn won re-election in a landslide, winning 96 percent of the vote.

== Candidates ==
- Bob Buckhorn, incumbent Mayor
- Jose Vazquez, businessman (write-in)

=== Dropped out ===
- Becky Rubright, acupuncturist and Occupy Tampa activist

== Results ==
2015 Tampa mayoral general election
Party	Candidate	Votes	%
Nonpartisan	Bob Buckhorn (inc.)	24,607	95.91%
Write-in		1,049	4.09%
Total votes		25,656	100.00%
