= 1963 Cleveland mayoral election =

Cleveland mayoral election, 1963
- November 5, 1963
Nominee	Ralph S. Locher
Party	Democratic
Popular vote	154,257
Percentage	100%
Mayor before election
Ralph S. Locher
Democratic
Elected mayor
Ralph S. Locher
Democratic

The Cleveland mayoral election of 1963 saw the re-election of Ralph S. Locher. Mayor Locher ran unopposed in the general election.

== General election ==
1963 Cleveland mayoral election (general election)
Party	Candidate	Votes	%
Democratic	Ralph S. Locher (incumbent)	154,257	100%
