= 1963 Swiss referendums =

Three referendums were held in Switzerland in 1963. The first was held on 26 May on a popular initiative on giving voters the right to decide on whether the Swiss Armed Forces should have nuclear weapons, and was rejected by voters. The second and third were held on 8 December on a federal resolution on continuing with the government's financial plans and on an amendment to the constitution on scholarships and educational allowances, both of which were approved by voters.

== Results ==
=== May: People's initiative on nuclear weapons ===
Choice	Popular vote		Cantons		
Choice	Votes	%	Full	Half	Total
For	274,061	37.8	4	1	4.5
Against	451,238	62.2	15	5	17.5
Blank votes	16,783	–	–	–	–
Invalid votes	1,387	–	–	–	–
Total	743,469	100	19	6	22
Registered voters/turnout	1,523,595	48.8	–	–	–
Source: Nohlen & Stöver

=== December: Constitutional amendment on scholarships on educational allowances ===
Choice	Popular vote		Cantons		
Choice	Votes	%	Full	Half	Total
For	479,987	78.5	19	6	22
Against	131,644	21.5	0	0	0
Blank votes	27,400	–	–	–	–
Invalid votes	909	–	–	–	–
Total	639,940	100	19	6	22
Registered voters/turnout	1,532,921	41.7	–	–	–
Source: Nohlen & Stöver

=== December: Federal resolution on finance ===
Choice	Popular vote		Cantons		
Choice	Votes	%	Full	Half	Total
For	474,786	77.6	19	6	22
Against	136,970	22.4	0	0	0
Blank votes	28,142	–	–	–	–
Invalid votes	970	–	–	–	–
Total	640,868	100	19	6	22
Registered voters/turnout	1,532,921	41.8	–	–	–
Source: Nohlen & Stöver
