= Sandra Freedman =

American politician (born 1943)

55th Mayor of Tampa
- In office July 16, 1986 – April 1, 1995
- Preceded by: Bob Martinez
- Succeeded by: Dick A. Greco

Council Chair of the Tampa City Council
- In office 1983 – July 16, 1986

Member of the Tampa City Council
- In office 1974 – July 16, 1986

Personal details
- Born: September 21, 1943 (age 82) Newark, New Jersey, U.S.
- Other political affiliations: Democratic
- Education: University of Miami

Sandra W. Freedman (born September 21, 1943, in Newark, New Jersey) is a former politician in Tampa, Florida. She was the first female mayor of Tampa, Florida and after completing a term for Bob Martinez was elected to two terms.

Freedman graduated with a degree in government from the University of Miami. She married Michael J. Freedman, an attorney, and the couple has three children. She was also the chairman of the Board of the National Civic League from 2008 to 2011.

She served on the City Council from 1974 and then as Council Chair from 1983 through July 16, 1986. She completed the remaining term of Bob Martinez who resigned to successfully campaign for Governor of Florida. After completing the remainder of Martinez's term, Freedman was twice elected Mayor of Tampa. She is Jewish.

Political offices
Preceded by Bob Martinez	Mayor of Tampa; July 16, 1986-April 1, 1995	Succeeded by Dick A. Greco
