= Bob Buckhorn =

American politician

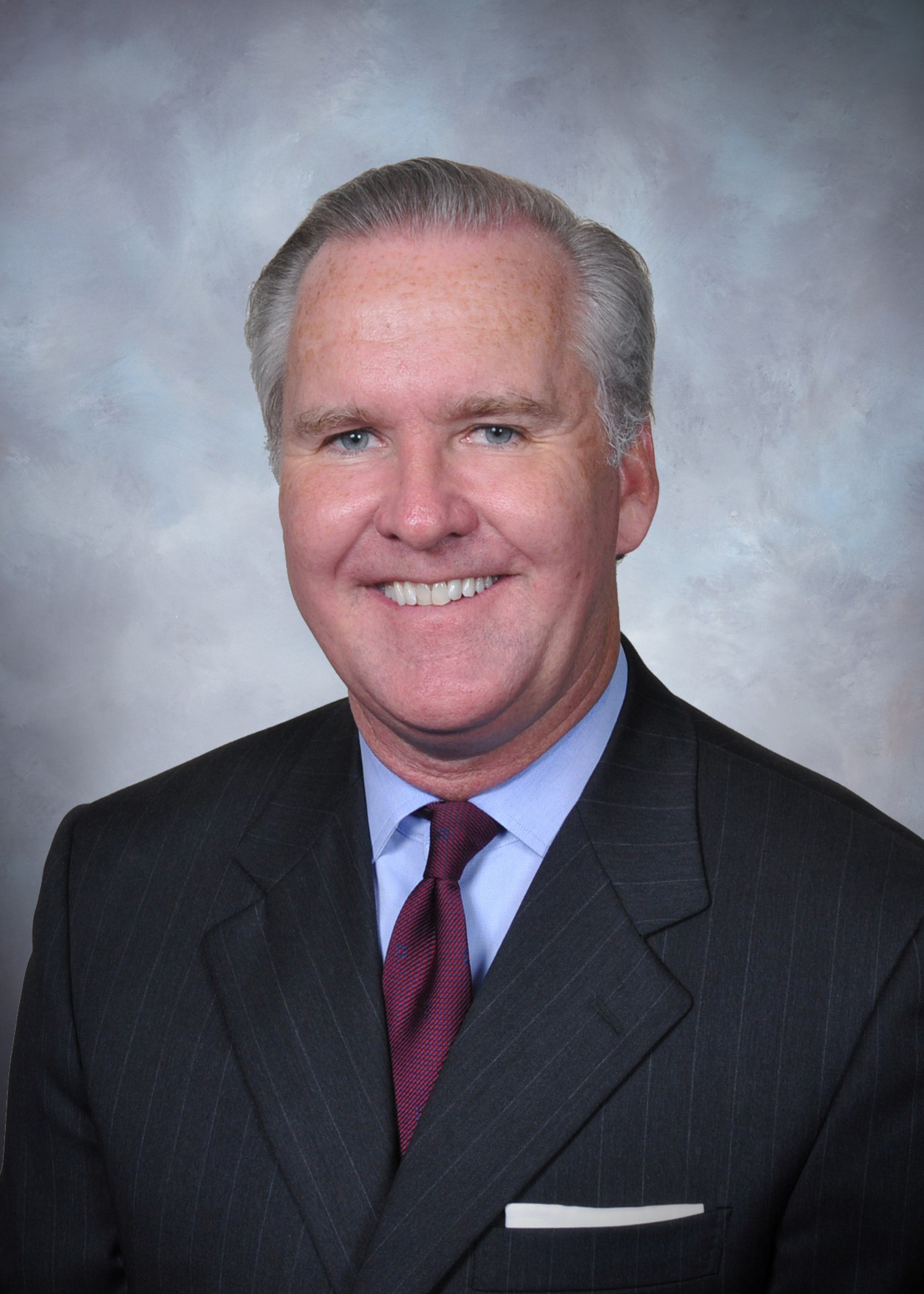

Mayor of Tampa
- In office April 1, 2011 – May 1, 2019
- Preceded by: Pam Iorio
- Succeeded by: Jane Castor

Personal details
- Born: Robert Francis Buckhorn Jr. July 29, 1958 (age 68) Evanston, Illinois, U.S.
- Party: Democratic
- Spouse: Catherine Lynch
- Education: Pennsylvania State University (BA)

Robert Francis Buckhorn Jr. (born July 29, 1958) is an American politician who served as the mayor of Tampa, Florida, from 2011 to 2019. He is a member of the Democratic Party who also served two terms on the Tampa City Council.

== Early life and education ==
Born in Evanston, Illinois, the eldest of three sons, Buckhorn grew up in Falls Church, Virginia. He graduated in 1980 with a bachelor's degree in political science from Pennsylvania State University, where he was on the college lacrosse team from 1976 to 1978. He was awarded the 2019 Outstanding Alumni Award in the College of Liberal Arts, Department of Political Science.

== Career ==
Buckhorn participating in the Tampa satellite event for the Million Mom March in 2000, advocating for increased gun control legislation

Buckhorn speaking at an event while on the Tampa City Council

Buckhorn with Mayor Pam Iorio in 2003

Buckhorn was the director of governmental affairs for the Builders Association of Greater Tampa. From 1987 to 1995, he served as special assistant to Tampa Mayor Sandra Freedman. In that role, he worked on projects such as removing MacDill Air Force Base from a Pentagon list of bases that were slated to be closed.

He lost a Democratic primary for a Florida House Seat in 1992. Buckhorn was elected to the Tampa City Council in 1995 and re-elected in 1999. His work included expanding the homestead exemption for seniors, tightening rules on lobbying and ethics, and promoting quality of life issues. In 2003, he finished third among five candidates for mayor. After leaving the city council in 2003, Buckhorn joined Dewey Square Group, a public affairs company with a national reputation. He lost a race for Hillsborough County Commission in 2004, and in 2007 he opened Buckhorn Partners, a public affairs firm based in Tampa.

=== Tampa mayor ===
Buckhorn ran again for mayor in 2011 and received key endorsements from the influential firefighters union and from outgoing incumbent Tampa Mayor Pam Iorio. He won a run-off and took office April 1, 2011.

In June 2011, Buckhorn formed the Economic Competitiveness Committee (ECC) to review the City of Tampa's permitting and regulatory processes and to look for ways to improve the system. One of the key recommendations the Buckhorn administration implemented was installing a system allowing permits to be applied for and tracked on-line.

Through the Invision Tampa plan, Buckhorn outlined his commitment to creating a more connected, livable city by focusing on the city's underutilized riverfront, generating a strong mixed-use pedestrian environment, building links between neighborhoods, and developing an urban pattern that supports transit. He also worked to restore the street grid, foster new retail opportunities, and successfully attract thousands of new urban residential developments such as the Residences on the Riverwalk and SkyHouse Tampa.

Buckhorn helped secure a Transportation Investment Generating Economic Recovery Grant from the U.S. Department of Transportation to complete the Tampa Riverwalk, which was in the planning and development stages by city officials for more than 40 years. The Tampa Riverwalk was named by the American Planning Association as the 2018 National Great Places in America "People's Choice'' category winner. Under Buckhorn's leadership, the city of Tampa also successfully hosted the Republican National Convention in 2012.

In his first term, Buckhorn also established one of Florida's first domestic partnership registries, and Tampa was recognized by the Human Rights Campaign with a perfect score on its Municipal Equality Index. He worked to bring back the Pride Parade for the first time in a decade, and he was recognized for his lifetime efforts on behalf of equality with the Tampa Bay Business Journal's Business of Pride award in 2019.

In 2015, Buckhorn was elected to a second term with close to 95% of the vote. A 40-acre development project in the Channel District, Water Street Tampa, began moving quickly. A partnership between Tampa Bay Lightning owner Jeff Vinik and Bill Gates (Cascade Investment), it will include a new hotel, 650,000 square feet of office space, retail, restaurants and entertainment venues. The $3 billion project will be WELL Certified and includes the University of South Florida's Morsani College of Medicine.

Under Buckhorn's leadership, Tampa became a destination for millennials who flocked to the city for opportunities at recent corporate relocations like Johnson and Johnson, AMGEN, and Bristol Myers Squibb, and major expansions by CITI and JP Morgan.

In recognition of his work on behalf of Tampa and its economic development efforts, Buckhorn was recognized with the Chairman's Award for Lifetime Achievement in Economic Development by the International Economic Development Council.

Buckhorn also initiated and completed Water Works Park, a $7.4 million downtown park that offers picnic areas, boat slips, a kayak launch, dog park, and giant water bucket and splash pad. With community involvement, the West River Redevelopment Plan, part of the InVision Plan, was created to transform the area west of the river. Substandard public housing will be replaced with new housing at all levels of affordability. This is the largest redevelopment initiative Tampa has undertaken and included a major redesign of the nearly 25 acre Julian B. Lane Riverfront Park that opened in May 2018. Buckhorn also ensured that Perry Harvey Sr. Park underwent a full renovation to showcase the history of the African American community in Tampa with statues, a history walk, music, a modernized skate park, also known as the world famous "Bro Bowl,'' and a splash pad.

Buckhorn worked for Tampa's inner-city youth. Through his Stay and Play initiative, operation hours at various community centers throughout Tampa were extended and free recreation cards are now provided to area youths. Buckhorn established the Mayor's Neighborhood University that has trained dozens of neighborhood activists and leaders.

Buckhorn also launched Autism Friendly Tampa, a citywide effort to educate residents on autism spectrum disorder and to make city programs, parks and facilities more inclusive. First responders were trained to recognize signs of autism and other disabilities. The Tampa Police Department launched a voluntary registry for families to let law enforcement know about autism or other disabilities within their households. The information is made available to officers responding to any situations at the home so they are aware of special needs.

Buckhorn served as mayor until May 2019, when former Tampa Police Chief Jane Castor succeeded him. During his tenure, Tampa was recognized as the best city in the southeast (Money magazine) one of the hottest cities for startups (Fortune), one of the fastest growing metro areas in the country (U.S. Census) and a Top 50 city for business (Inc.).

== Personal life ==
He is married to Dr. Catherine Lynch Buckhorn and they have two daughters.

Political offices
Preceded by Pam Iorio	Mayor of Tampa; 2011–2019	Succeeded by Jane Castor
