= Pam Iorio =

American politician (born 1959)

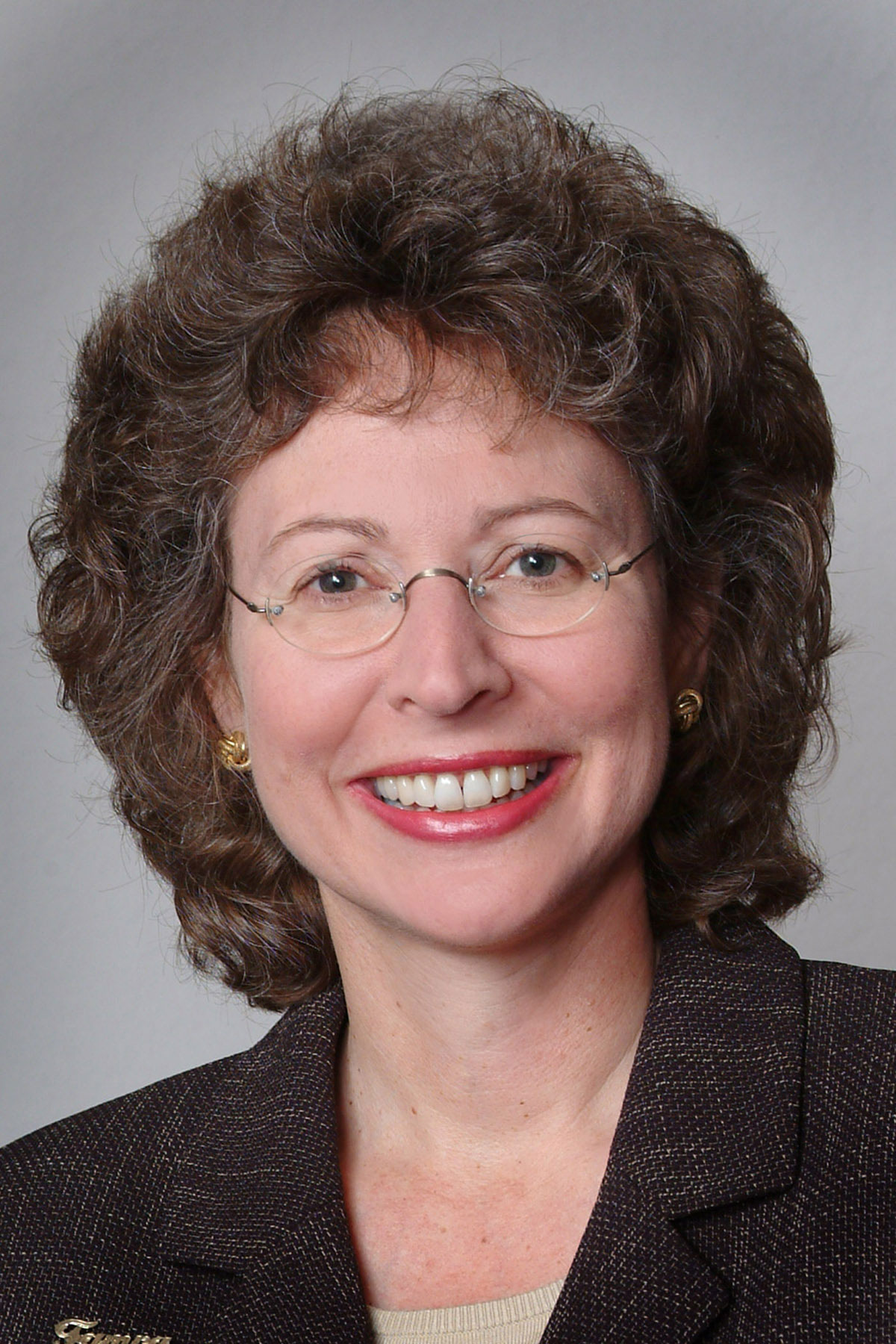
- 2010 portrait

57th Mayor of Tampa
- In office April 1, 2003 – March 31, 2011
- Preceded by: Dick Greco
- Succeeded by: Bob Buckhorn

Hillsborough County Supervisor of Elections
- In office January 5, 1993 – January 17, 2003
- Preceded by: Robin C. Krivanek
- Succeeded by: Buddy Johnson

Personal details
- Born: Pamela Dorothy Iorio; April 27, 1959 (age 67) Waterville, Maine, U.S.
- Party: Democratic
- Spouse: Mark Woodard
- Children: 2
- Education: American University (BS); University of South Florida, Tampa (MA)
- Website: pamiorio.com

Pamela Dorothy Iorio (born April 27, 1959) is an American politician and author, who served as mayor of Tampa, Florida from 2003 to 2011.

== Early life, education, and family ==
Iorio moved with her family to Temple Terrace as an infant and attended Hillsborough County public schools. Iorio earned her bachelor's degree from American University and followed up with her masters at the University of South Florida. Iorio has been married to Mark Woodard, County Administrator for Pinellas County, since 1987, and they have two children, Caitlin and Graham. Her father, John Iorio, was an Italian immigrant and English professor, and one of the first professors at the University of South Florida.

== Career ==
In 1985, at the age of 26, she became the youngest person ever elected to the Hillsborough County Commission. She was elected Hillsborough County Supervisor of Elections in 1992, and was sworn in on January 5, 1993. During the 2000 presidential election recount, she was the president of the State Association of County Elections Supervisors propelling her into the role of spokesperson. In 2001, her account of the white supremacist White Municipal Party was published in The Florida Historical Quarterly. She resigned in 2003 to campaign for mayor of Tampa.

On April 1, 2003, she was sworn in as Mayor of Tampa, becoming the second woman to hold the office. Her first term dealt largely with re-energizing the downtown area, as well as the economic revitalization of Tampa’s most neglected neighborhoods. Iorio was also a big supporter of the arts, working to make Tampa a major arts center in the South. Iorio has also been credited with a sharp drop in drug trafficking in the city limits and a significant drop in major crimes. In her second term, Iorio advocated for improved mass transit, favoring a multi-modal plan which included a light rail system. While mayor, Tampa hosted a Super Bowl and successfully attracted the 2012 Republican National Convention.

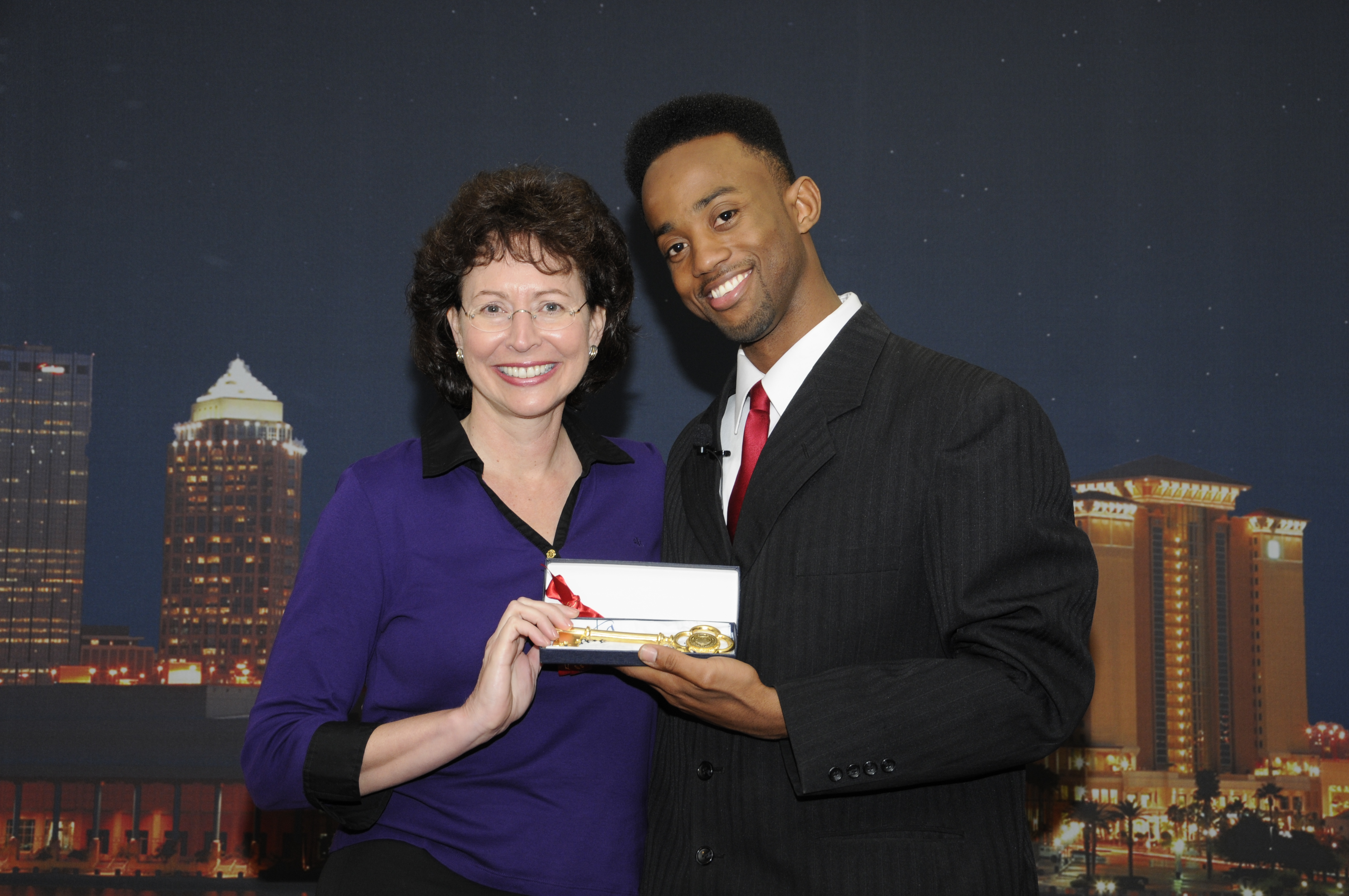
Iorio presenting a key to the city to talk show host Motown Maurice

In her official capacity as mayor, Iorio represented the city at important events such as the opening of the Tampa Bay History Center on January 17, 2009. On January 28, 2010, when Iorio welcomed U.S. President Barack Obama and Vice President Joe Biden, Governor of Florida Charlie Crist, and Chief Financial Officer Alex Sink, all of whom came to the University of Tampa for a national "Town Hall Meeting" to announce federal funding for Florida High Speed Rail and other projects. Iorio criticized Florida Governor Rick Scott's decision to veto the high speed rail project, claiming he did so "purely on ideological reasoning."

Her book, Straightforward, was released in November 2011. In the book she draws from her own experiences and shares the skills and characteristics needed to become an effective leader.

Since her time as mayor ended, Iorio has focused her time on working with Tampa area non-profits and spending time with her family. She has been involved with the Tampa Bay History Center, the Curtis Hixon Park and Riverwalk, and the USF Foundation

She had been mentioned as a possible Democratic Party candidate for governor of Florida in 2014. Iorio ultimately did not run. Iorio has also proposed changes to Florida's election laws in order to avoid long lines at the polls and other irregularities.

In February 2014 Iorio was named as the president and CEO of Big Brothers Big Sisters of America, effective March 31, 2014.

In November 2018, Iorio was included in PEOPLE Magazine's "25 Women Changing the World in 2018."

== Publications ==
- Iorio, Pam (February 16, 2012), "A textbook lesson in bad leadership", The Tampa Bay Times
- Iorio, Pam (2011), Straightforward: Ways to Live and Lead, McG Books, ISBN 9780984649204
- Colorless Primaries: Tampa's White Municipal Party, The Florida Historical Quarterly, Vol. 79, No. 3, Reconsidering Race Relations in Early Twentieth-Century Florida (Winter, 2001), pages 297-318 (22 pages)
- Iorio, Pam (August 2000), "Political Excess Shaped by a Game of Chance: Tampa, Bolita, and the First Half of the Twentieth Century", The Sunland Tribune: Journal of the Tampa Historical Society, 26 (1), Digital Collection - Florida Studies Center Publications: paper 2588, p.27

== See also ==
- List of mayors of Tampa, Florida

Political offices
Preceded by Dick A. Greco	Mayor of Tampa; 2003–2011	Succeeded by Bob Buckhorn
