= Nick Nuccio =

American politician

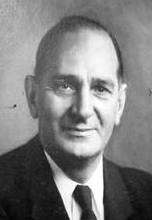

Mayor of Tampa
- In office October 1, 1963 – October 3, 1967
- Preceded by: Julian Lane
- Succeeded by: Dick A. Greco
- In office October 2, 1956 – October 1, 1959
- Preceded by: J.L. Young, Jr.
- Succeeded by: Julian Lane

Member of the Tampa City Council
- In office 1929–1937

Member of Board of County Commissioners of Hillsborough County
- In office 1937–1956

Personal details
- Born: October 10, 1901 Ybor City, Florida, U.S.
- Died: August 26, 1989 (aged 87) Tampa, Florida, U.S.
- Party: Democratic
- Spouse: Concetta Licata (m. 1924; died 1989)
- Children: 3
- Profession: Businessman / Politician

Nicholas Chillura Nuccio (October 24, 1901 – August 26, 1989) was a two-time mayor of Tampa, Florida in the 1950s and 60s. He was the Tampa's first mayor of "Latin" (specifically Sicilian) descent, having been born and raised in the immigrant neighborhood of Ybor City.

== Early life and career ==
Nick Nuccio was the son of Sicilian immigrants who were among the earliest settlers of Ybor City, an immigrant-founded neighborhood in Tampa, Florida originally based on the cigar industry. Like most Sicilians who arrived in Ybor City in the late 1800s, Nuccio's mother was from the town of Santo Stefano Quisquina, while his father was from nearby Palermo. The many Cuban, Spanish, and Sicilian residents of Ybor City were often referred to as "Latins" by Tampa's "Anglo" community, and as the disparate immigrants worked, went to school, and socialized together in their largely self-sufficient neighborhood, they formed a common identity strong enough that their descendants still call themselves by that term over a century later.

As was common at the time, Nuccio took a job to earn money for his family before earning a high school diploma, quitting Hillsborough High School after 10th grade to work as a ship fitter in the Tampa shipyards during World War I. After the war, Nuccio dabbled in real estate and insurance sales before becoming a clerk at the Ybor City post office in 1926. Nuccio married Concetta Licata on July 6, 1924 and they had three children.

== Early political career ==
In 1929, Nuccio successfully ran for a seat on the Tampa City Council as a representative from Ybor City. He was reelected several times before moving on to the Hillsborough County Commission in 1937, a post he held continuously until 1956.

While serving as chairman of the county commission, Nuccio found a novel method of increasing his local name recognition. A strong proponent of neighborhood improvements, Nuccio managed to get the words "Nick C. Nuccio, County Commissioner" stamped on every public works project he had approved. For several subsequent decades, his name was visible on sidewalks, park benches, seawalls, and virtually every other piece of concrete laid by Hillsborough County during his long tenure.

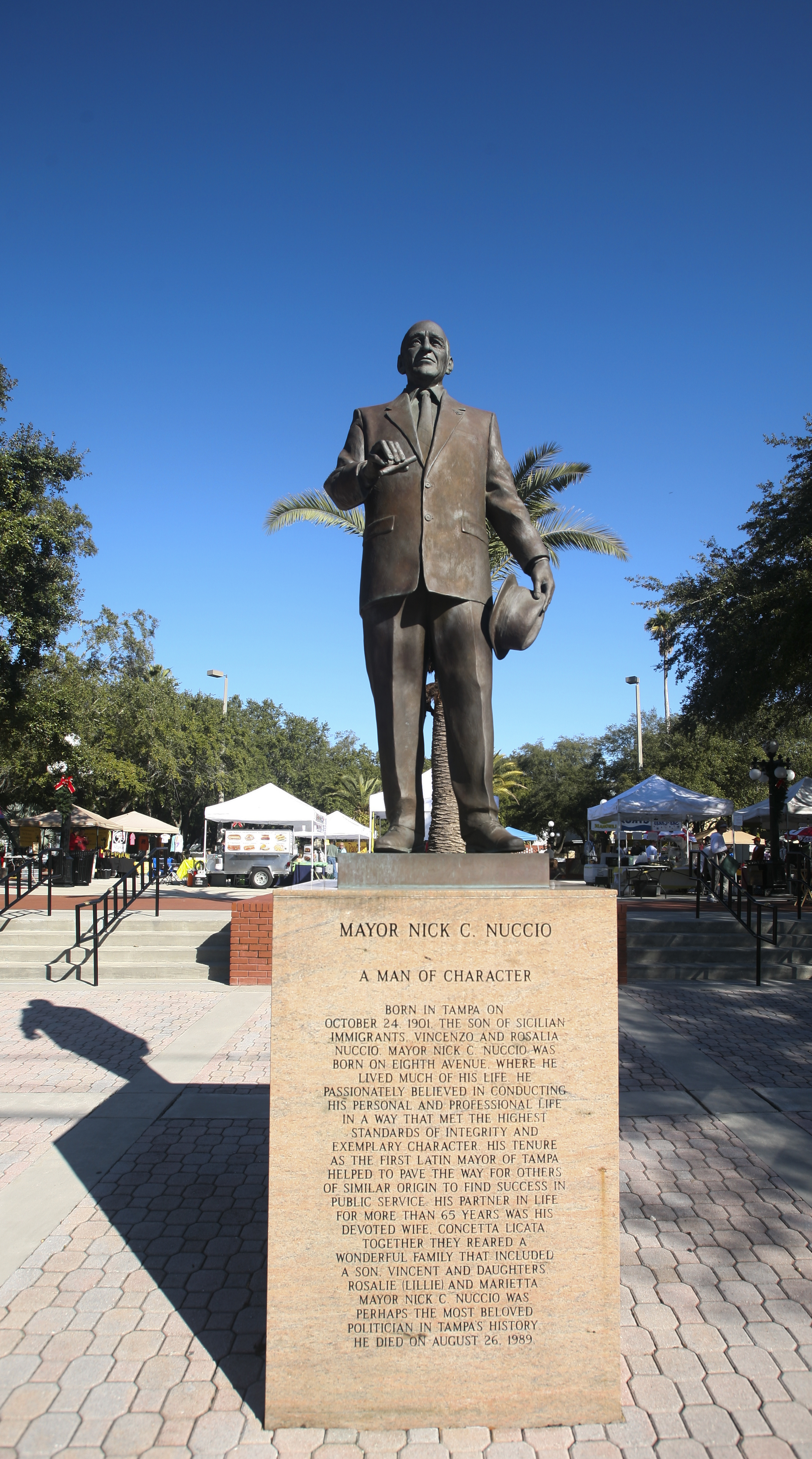
Statue of Nick Nuccio in Ybor City

== Mayor ==
=== Unsuccessful run ===
By the mid-1950s, Nuccio had built up substantial support in Tampa, especially among Latin voters in Ybor City and West Tampa, and decided to run for mayor. In 1955, he challenged incumbent Curtis Hixon, who had been in office since 1943. Hixon easily defeated Nuccio, winning reelection after national newspaper coverage alleged that Nuccio had close ties to organized crime. Hixon died in 1956 before finishing the term, and Nuccio ran for the office again against interim mayor J.L. Young. Although the Tampa Tribune again endorsed Nuccio's opponent, Nuccio won in an extremely close runoff election (50.1% to 49.9%) to become Tampa's first "Latin" mayor.

=== First term ===
While in the mayor's office, Nuccio continued his enthusiasm for public works projects and strove to keep his neighborhood constituents happy by personally helping to solve problems, believing that government's role was to "have a positive influence in people's lives." Nuccio successfully pushed for the construction of many libraries, bridges, fire and police stations, public pools, and parks (most notably Lowry Park Zoo), among other projects, many of which are still in use today.

Nuccio was also known for his unconventional governing style and unusual daily schedule. He regularly ate a breakfast of toasted Cuban bread and Café con leche at a small cafe in West Tampa, sometimes moving on to another cafe in Ybor City later in the morning. Constituents were welcome to sit and talk with the mayor about their issues in English, Spanish, or Italian, and they often left with a promise of help from the city. These conversations could continue into lunchtime, which Nuccio usually ate in his own home, often bringing home visitors to share his wife's home-cooked meal. After lunch, Nuccio often enjoyed a short nap at home, after which the mayor would finally arrive at his downtown office, where he would stay late into the evening.

=== Second Term ===
Nuccio was immensely popular among Tampa's Latin residents but was equally disliked by others in Tampa's "Anglo" community. During his 1959 reelection campaign, challenger Julian Lane depicted him as an old-fashioned machine-era politician and easily defeated the incumbent with a pledge of "honest government" and "sound business practices". Racial unrest and problems with flooding along the Hillsborough River had damaged Lane's popularity by 1963, when he sought a second term. Nuccio came out of retirement for an electoral rematch and won a close election to regain the mayor's office.

Times had changed by the late 1960s. Nuccio's personal political style was not as effective in what was Tampa's first mass-media election campaign, and he lost his 1967 reelection bid to the much younger and more media-savvy Dick Greco, Jr., another native of Ybor City whom Nuccio had long regarded as a political protégé. In 1971, Nuccio again ran against Greco for the mayor's office but was again defeated, at which point he retired from political life.

Despite these losses, Nuccio was still extremely popular in Tampa's Latin community in retirement. He died in 1989, and a large bronze statue of the former mayor holding his trademark hat and large Tampa cigar was dedicated in Ybor City's Centennial Park in 1999.

Political offices
Preceded by Julian Lane	Mayor of Tampa; October 1, 1963 – October 3, 1967	Succeeded by Dick A. Greco
