= SS Mascotte =

American steamship (1886–1931)

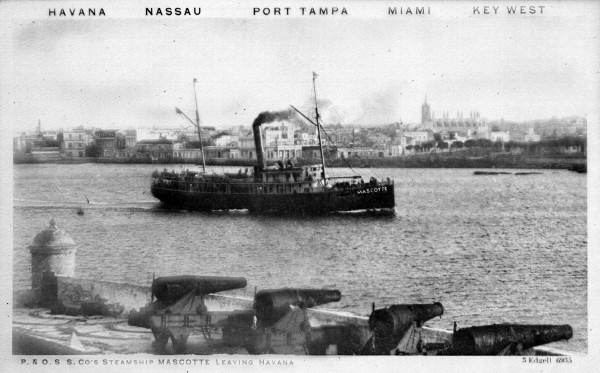
- The steamship Mascotte leaving the P&O docks at the Arsenal, Havana Harbor, Cuba, c. 1900

History

United States
- Name: Mascotte
- Owner: Plant Investment Company
- Operator: Plant Steamship Line
- Builder: William Cramp & Sons, Philadelphia, Pennsylvania
- Launched: c. 23 October 1885
- Completed: 7 January 1886
- Owner: Peninsular and Occidental Steamship Company
- Acquired: 19 December 1900

General characteristics
- Type: Steamship (Passenger & Cargo)
- Length: 207.9 feet (63.4 m)

SS Mascotte was an American steamship that operated for the Plant Steamship Line, and later the Peninsular and Occidental Steamship Company, serving Tampa, Key West, and Havana.

The ship was built in 1886 by William Cramp & Sons of Philadelphia for shipping and railroad magnate Henry B. Plant and the Plant System, a network of railroads and steamship lines that linked Florida to Cuba and the rest of the country.

In late 1885, Plant's wife Margaret christened the new vessel, naming the ship after Edmond Audran's comic opera La mascotte in the hope that it would bring the ship the same good luck depicted in the opera. A contemporary account of the christening in the Philadelphia Times, published October 23, 1885, described Plant breaking a bottle of wine across the ship's bow amid cheers. The ship was placed into commercial service several months later under Captain James McKay Jr., who would later serve as the 34th Mayor of Tampa.

Writing in 1912, Jefferson B. Browne stated that Plant "spared no expense" in the construction of the Mascotte and her sister ship SS Olivette. The Mascotte was designed to be the fastest vessel of its type built in the United States, targeting a speed of 17 miles per hour. Two 18-foot locomotive-type steel boilers powered a 1,250-horsepower engine driving a 10-foot propeller with a 14-foot pitch. Browne wrote that no other coastal steamship in the country could match the Olivette for speed, and that passengers could set their watches by both ships' arrivals just as they would a train's. Passengers on Plant's excursion packages could extend their Florida stay for up to five months and travel onward to Cuba aboard the Olivette or Mascotte, spending a week in Havana as part of the trip.

== Wartime service ==
=== 1895 uprising order ===
In early 1895, Cuban revolutionary leader José Martí signed the order for an armed uprising against Spanish colonial rule, initiating the Cuban War of Independence. The order had been approved at a meeting of Cuban revolutionaries in New York City, then carried to Ybor City in Tampa, a center of Cuban exile activity. There, a local cigarmaker, Blas O’Halloran, rolled it inside one of five identical Panetela cigars at the O’Halloran Cigar Factory.

The specific "Cigar of Liberty" was marked with two tiny yellow specks. A courier named Miguel Angel Duque de Estrada boarded the SS Mascotte in Key West on February 21, 1895, and, keeping the "loaded" cigar in his mouth, calmly passed Spanish customs agents in Havana. The message reached Juan Gualberto Gómez, who with other conspirators, set the uprising for February 24, 1895.

=== 1896 embargo ===
In early 1896, Spanish general Valeriano Weyler declared an embargo on tobacco exports from Cuba, giving a ten-day grace period before it took effect. This prompted Vicente Martínez Ybor and other manufacturers to persuade Plant to send both the Olivette and Mascotte to Havana to bring back cargo before the embargo began. Both ships returned with packed cargo holds and staterooms, keeping the factories operational.

The Mascotte and the Olivette are credited with having carried enough tobacco into Tampa across the embargoes of the Cuban War of Independence to shield the city's cigar industry from Spain's attempts to cut off its tobacco supply.

=== Spanish–American War ===
Both ships also carried wartime personnel during the Spanish–American War. The Mascotte brought back wounded soldiers after the war broke out in April 1898.

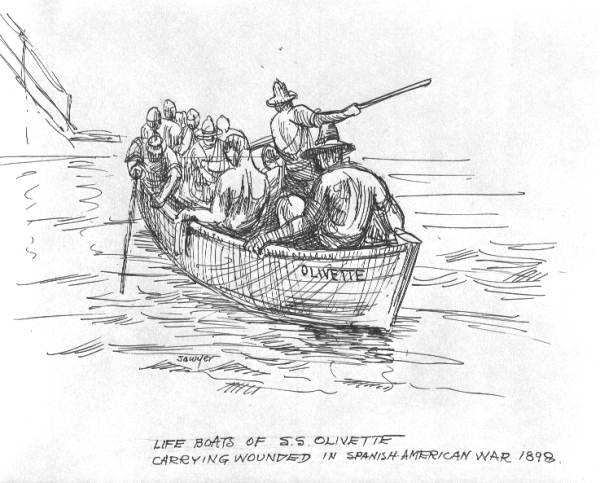
Lifeboat of the SS Olivette carrying wounded in the Spanish-American War, 1898.

The Olivette's role was more extensive. The ship arrived in Havana harbor on February 16, 1898, the day after the sinking of the USS Maine, and its departure from Havana that day prompted the transfer of the Maine's wounded to the San Ambrosia Hospital ashore. Survivors of the Maine were later brought home to Port Tampa aboard the Olivette on March 28, 1898, greeted by a large crowd.

Once the war began that April, the Olivette took on sick and wounded from the transports early in the U.S. invasion of Cuba, and the retention of the 2nd Division's hospital aboard the ship led it to become the Army's first hospital ship in the campaign. On July 9, 1898, the Olivette left Santiago with 279 wounded, arriving in New York City about a week later, then returned to Cuba with medical supplies and immune nurses and physicians. Later, amid the general evacuation of the V Corps, the Olivette carried 203 sick to Boston on August 15, 1898, before running aground and foundering while coaling in heavy seas off Fernandina, without loss of life.

The ships' tobacco runs continued alongside this wartime service. A renewed Spanish embargo was again threatening the supply of Cuban tobacco leaves, and Ybor again appealed to Plant to send his ships to Havana. Plant complied in September 1898, dispatching the Mascotte, which returned from two trips packed with 155 and 300 bales of tobacco respectively, along with Cuban refugees, keeping Tampa's cigar factories operational through the crisis. The Mascotte was reported to have carried around 900 refugees from Cuba to Tampa in total during this period.

24th U.S. Infantry disembarking the Mascotte in Port Tampa, 1898.

==== Rough Riders ====
According to the Tampa Times, the Mascotte assisted in transporting the Rough Riders from Tampa Bay to Cuba. Several other sources state the steamship Yucatan was the transport vessel of the Rough Riders.

==== Buffalo Soldiers ====
The 24th Infantry Regiment, a part of the Buffalo Soldiers, arrived in Tampa aboard the Mascotte in early May of 1898. Along with the 25th Infantry Regiment, the soldiers would experience racial discrimination while in Florida, leading to the 1898 Tampa riot on June 6. The following day, the 24th and 25th Infantry would leave for Cuba on the City of Washington and SS Concho respectively.

== Later career ==
Following Plant's death in July 1899, the Plant System's steamship operations were folded into the newly created Peninsular and Occidental Steamship Company, and the Mascotte officially joined that fleet on December 19, 1900. After more than two decades of service, the ship was retired from the Tampa–Havana route and sold in 1923 to a Massachusetts line, where it worked as a passenger ferry connecting Boston and Gloucester. Ownership changed hands twice more, in December 1925 and again in 1929, when the ship's upper decks were removed and it was converted into a barge. The ship was last recorded in 1931, when it was sold for scrap alongside two other retired hulls, the Edgewater and Riverside, in a combined sale worth only about $100.

The Olivette remained in service on the Tampa–Havana route for about two more decades after the war. It was ultimately lost in a January 1918 storm, running aground on rocks several miles east of Havana harbor and becoming a total loss. The wreck occurred on January 7, and a photograph record held by the State Library and Archives of Florida places it roughly 10 miles east of the harbor on January 18. The loss disrupted the cigar manufacturers' tobacco shipments, as without the Olivette, service between Tampa and Havana had to be split across two vessels. A smaller and older ship covered the Tampa–Key West leg, while the steamer Miami handled the Key West–Havana leg, forcing cargo and travelers to change ships partway and causing significant delays.

== Legacy ==
Mascotte, Florida was supposedly named after the steamship, and the ship additionally appears on the seal of the city. However, one account in the Orlando Sentinel attributes the naming to J. W. Payne of Boston, after an SS Mascotte that ran between Baltimore and St. Petersburg.

In 1895, a likeness of the Mascotte, depicted as a sailing ship rather than a steamship, was incorporated into the Seal of Tampa, after cigar box manufacturer Henry Leiman received the Tampa City Council's permission to use it. That seal is in turn incorporated into the city flag, superimposed on a blue "T".

== See also ==
- SS Florida (1931)
- SS Henry B. Plant
- HMCS Reindeer
