= Francis L. Wing =

American politician (1868–1941)

37th Mayor of Tampa, Florida
- In office June 5, 1908 – June 6, 1910
- Preceded by: William H. Frecker
- Succeeded by: Donald Brenham McKay

33rd Mayor of Tampa, Florida
- In office June 8, 1900 – June 4, 1902
- Preceded by: Frank C. Bowyer
- Succeeded by: James McKay Jr.

Member of the Tampa City Council
- In office June 1898 – June 1900

Personal details
- Born: Francis Lyman Wing; May 9, 1868 New Bedford, Massachusetts, U.S.
- Died: October 29, 1941 (aged 73) Tampa, Florida, U.S.
- Party: Democratic
- Spouse: Anna Hale (m. 1892)
- Children: 4
- Occupation: Politician, businessman

Francis Lyman Wing (May 9, 1868 – October 29, 1941) was an American politician and businessman who served two non-consecutive terms as mayor of Tampa, Florida. He served as the 33rd mayor of Tampa from 1900 to 1902, then served as the city's 37th mayor from 1908 to 1910. Wing also served on the Tampa City Council from 1898 to 1900.

== Early life ==
Wing was born in New Bedford, Massachusetts, on May 9, 1868, to Lyman Wing and Hannah Wing.

== Career ==
In 1889, Wing moved to Tampa, Florida, where he opened a furniture store and laundry. He later became a successful builder and real estate developer.

Wing constructed the Puritan Hotel in Tampa. He was also a board member of several local businesses.

In addition to serving a term as county treasurer, Wing served on the Tampa City Council from June 1898 to June 1900, immediately after which he was elected the 33rd mayor of Tampa, Florida. He served from June 8, 1900, to June 4, 1902. Wing was preceded in office by Frank C. Bowyer and succeeded by James McKay Jr.

During Wing's first term as mayor, Tampa experienced a steady population growth, largely due to the economic prosperity from the cigar industry in Ybor City and the Port of Tampa. This growth also placed a strain on public works and services that were not equipped to handle the large influx of new residents to the city, prompting Wing to appoint an auditor, City Attorney, City Health Officer, and other officials to head several key departments, such as the Department of Sanitation.

Wing was subsequently elected the 37th mayor of Tampa, serving from June 5, 1908, to June 6, 1910. He was preceded in office by William H. Frecker and succeeded by Donald Brenham McKay.

During his second term as mayor, Wing was instrumental in the construction of the Gordon Keller Hospital, which was named for former City Treasurer Gordon Keller. Wing also increased the police and fire departments, initiated an expansion in public works projects such as sewers and water drainage, and made substantial improvements to the Port of Tampa. In 1910, the United States Congress appropriated $1,750,000 to complete the development of the port.

== Personal life and death ==
After his second term as mayor, Wing retired from politics and devoted himself to business, family, and social activities, including the Elks Club. He was the first grand exalted ruler of the Tampa Elks lodge to serve a full term, and was actively identified with Masonic bodies.

Wing married Anna Hale in Tampa on November 30, 1892. The following year, he built a house in Tampa Heights, where the couple raised their children.

Wing owned citrus groves.

Wing died at the age of 73 at his home in Tampa on October 29, 1941.

== See also ==
- List of mayors of Tampa, Florida

Political offices
Preceded by —	Member of the Tampa City Council; 1898–1900	Succeeded by —
Preceded by Frank C. Bowyer	33rd Mayor of Tampa, Florida; 1900–1902	Succeeded by James McKay Jr.
Preceded by William H. Frecker	37th Mayor of Tampa, Florida; 1908–1910	Succeeded by Donald Brenham McKay
