= Robert E. Lee Chancey =

American politician

Hillsborough County Solicitor
- In office 1916–1916
- In office 1923–1929

44th Mayor of Tampa
- In office November 3, 1931 – November 3, 1943
- Preceded by: Thomas N. Henderson
- Succeeded by: Curtis Hixon

Personal details
- Born: December 16, 1880 Offerman, Georgia
- Died: June 1, 1948 (aged 67) Tampa, Florida
- Party: White Municipal Party
- Relations: Patrick C. Whitaker (brother-in-law)
- Education: Mercer University

Robert E. Lee Chancey (December 16, 1880 – June 1, 1948) was a lawyer who served as mayor of Tampa, Florida. He was a member of the White Municipal Party.

Robert E. Lee Chancey was born in Offerman, Georgia. He attended public schools and graduated from Mercer University in 1902 with a law degree. Chancey moved to Tampa in 1905 and worked for attorney, M.B. Macfarlane until 1918.

He married Jennie Cortinio in Tampa in September 1910 and they had two sons. One was killed in an automobile accident leaving William B. as his only surviving son. Throughout his life he was socially and politically active. Chancey was a member of the Elks Club and the Knights of Pythias.

Chancey was appointed county solicitor and served from 1916 to 1921 and a second time from 1923 to 1929. He was also the president of the Hillsborough County Bar Association.

Chancey died on June 1, 1948, in Tampa, Florida.

== Mayor of Tampa ==
He served as the mayor of Tampa from November 1931 until November 1943. In 1935 six Tampa policemen were indicted for their alleged involvement in the kidnapping and torture or members of a political organization known as the Modern Democrats. The police chief was also implicated in obstructing an investigation. Chancey's brother-in-law Patrick Crisp Whitaker was the lead defense attorney.

He was mayor during the Works Progress Administration's planned funding of an American Hellenic Center in Tampa.

== See also ==
- List of mayors of Tampa, Florida
