= Francis Wing =

Francis Wing may refer to:

- Francis Joseph Wing, American judge
- Francis L. Wing, mayor of Tampa, Florida
