= Zachariah D. Green =

American lawyer

Zacariah D. Green, sometimes spelled Zacariah D. Greene, was an American lawyer, principal, and community leader in Tampa, Florida. He worked as a lawyer in South Carolina before moving to Tampa where he served as principal of Harlem Academy School. He was also a leader in the St. Paul's AME Church.

Greene earned a law degree from Allen University in Columbia, South Carolina and was admitted to the bar in 1890. He represented clients in Georgetown, South Carolina. He eventually left South Carolina for Florida.

After he submitted signatures to become a candidate for municipal judge in 1908, a local election, Tampa city officials blocked him and Judge Wall blocked his appeal. D.B. McKay, Wall and others organized the White Municipal Party in Tampa to exclude African Americans from elections. The group dominated local elections and every Tampa mayor belonged to it from 1910 until 1947.

In 1887, Joseph A. Walker, a carpenter and merchant, became the first African American elected to Tampa's city council.

== See also ==
- African American officeholders from the end of the Civil War until before 1900
- African-American officeholders (1900–1959)
