= Hamlin Valentine Snell =

American lawyer and politician in Florida

6th President of the Florida Senate
- Preceded by: Robert J. Floyd
- Succeeded by: Philip Dell

8th Speaker of the Florida House of Representatives
- In office November 24, 1856 – December 27, 1856
- Preceded by: Philip Dell
- Succeeded by: John B. Galbraith

8th Mayor of Tampa
- In office February 2, 1861 – February 3, 1862
- Preceded by: John P. Circhton
- Succeeded by: John Jackson

Personal details
- Born: February 14, 1810 Savannah, Georgia
- Died: January 29, 1886 (aged 75) Gainesville, Florida
- Occupation: Politician, lawyer

Hamlin Valentine Snell (February 14, 1810 – January 29, 1886) was an American lawyer and politician in Florida. He served as speaker of the Florida House of Representatives, was president of the Florida State Senate, and was the eighth mayor of Tampa, Florida.

He was born in Savannah, Georgia. He was William H. Whitaker's half-brother.

Snell originally moved to Florida in the late 1830s. In 1840 he'd be elected as Calhoun County's representative to the Territorial Legislative Council. He'd move once more again to what is today Sarasota County in 1842 where he started a guava plantation.

Snell was elected to the Florida Senate to represent Hillsborough County in 1854. He led the creation of Manatee County in 1855. In 1856, he was elected as the first state representative of the newly created Manatee County in the Florida House of Representatives.

Snell moved to Tampa sometime in late 1857. He became the Port of Tampa's deputy collector in June 1858. He served as the mayor of Tampa from February 1, 1860, until February 2, 1861. As mayor, he celebrated the start of the American Civil War. Martial law was declared in Tampa on April 21, 1861, by the 20th Florida Regiment after it had taken control of Fort Brooke. Close to three weeks after martial law was declared, he fled Tampa like many other citizens of the city at the time. He married Mary Beville in 1867. Local artist Ruth Finney Horney painted a portrait of him.

He died on January 29, 1886, in Gainesville, Florida.

== See also ==
- List of mayors of Tampa, Florida
- List of speakers of the Florida House of Representatives
- List of presidents of the Florida Senate
