= Perry G. Wall II =

American businessman and politician

41st Mayor of Tampa
- In office January 3, 1928 – January 8, 1924

Chairman of the Florida Committee on Taxation and Finance
- In office 1930–1932

Harbourmaster of Tampa
- In office 1932–1936

Personal details
- Born: November 22, 1867 Hernando County, Florida
- Died: January 25, 1944 (aged 76) Tampa, Florida
- Education: East Florida Seminary; Bingham Military School

Perry G. Wall II (November 22, 1867 - January 25, 1944) was an American businessman and politician in Tampa, Florida.

He was the grandson of Judge Perry Green Wall, who had been a pioneer on Florida's west coast and then a judge in Hamilton County, Florida.

Wall lived in Spring Hill, Florida. He studied at East Florida Seminary in Gainesville, Florida, and Bingham Military School in Asheville, North Carolina.

He was a partner in the Knight & Wall hardware business with Henry Laurens Knight in Tampa. The two men founded the business in 1884.

Wall was active in multiple civic and political groups with alliance to the Democratic Party. For two years beginning in 1897, he served on the Hillsborough County School Board. He served on the Executive Committee of the white supremacist White Municipal Party that effectively excluded African Americans from Tampa's mayoral elections for decades from 1910.

Wall was mayor of Tampa, Florida, from January 8, 1924, until January 3, 1928. During his four-year term, Tampa experienced a building boom. Major projects under his leadership included the residential areas of Temple Terrace and Davis Island. While construction had begun in his predecessor's term, the Gandy Bridge to St. Petersburg was opened while Wall was mayor; when constructed, this bridge was the longest automobile toll bridge in the world. A 1926 photograph captured him at a baseball game while he was mayor.

Following his mayoral stint, Wall was chairman of Florida's Committee on Taxation and Finance. He was then appointed as harbormaster in Tampa, serving from 1932 to 1936.

Wall was married to Mattie Houston. Together they had two children.

He died in Tampa on January 25, 1944.

== See also ==
- List of mayors of Tampa, Florida
