= Frederick A. Salomonson =

American politician (1860–1911)

28th, 30th & 35th Mayor of Tampa
- In office June 5, 1904 – June 7, 1906
- Preceded by: Herman Glogowski
- Succeeded by: Robert W. Easley
- In office March 8, 1895 – June 5, 1896
- Preceded by: Robert W. Easley
- Succeeded by: Myron E. Gillett
- In office March 10, 1893 – March 9, 1894
- Preceded by: James McKay Jr.
- Succeeded by: William H. Frecker

Member of the Tampa City Council
- In office March 4, 1892 – March 10, 1893
- In office March 6, 1889 – March 5, 1890

Personal details
- Born: July 20, 1860 Almelo, Netherlands
- Died: December 19, 1911 (aged 51) Tampa, Florida, U.S.
- Cause of death: Tuberculosis
- Party: Republican

Frederick A. Salomonson (July 20, 1860 – December 19, 1911) was a three-time mayor of Tampa, Florida in the 1890s and 1900s.

Salomonson would move to Florida in 1882 as a representative of a Dutch business syndicate that had purchased sizable amounts of land in Florida. At some point he would move to Jacksonville and would work for two years in the railroad industry prior to moving to Tampa in late 1884 where he would establish himself in the real estate industry there.

His first venture into city politics was when he was elected as a member of the Tampa City Council serving two terms nonconsecutively. The first being from March 6, 1889, to March 5, 1890, and his second term lasting from March 4, 1892, to March 10, 1893.

He was first elected mayor in March 1893 and served until March 1894. He was elected again to a second term in March 1895 and served until June 1896. He was re elected for a third term on June 5, 1904, and served as the 35th Mayor Of Tampa until June 7, 1906.

After leaving office in 1906, he would become ill with tuberculosis. He would eventually die of it on December 19, 1911, in Tampa.

== Bibliography ==
- Covington, Dr. James W. and Wavering, Debbie Lee, "The Mayors of Tampa: A Brief Administrative History," Tampa, FL: University of Tampa, 1987.
- Grismer, Karl H., Tampa: A History of the City and the Tampa Bay Region of Florida, St. Petersburg Printing Company, FL, 1950.
- Robinson, Ernest L., History of Hillsborough County, Florida: Narrative and Biographical, The Record Company, St. Augustine, FL, 1928.

Political offices
Preceded by Herman Glogowski	Mayor of Tampa; March 10, 1893 – March 9, 1894	Succeeded by Robert W. Easley
Preceded by Robert W. Easley	Mayor of Tampa; March 8, 1895 – June 5, 1896	Succeeded by Myron E. Gillett
Preceded by James McKay Jr.	Mayor of Tampa; June 5, 1904 – June 7, 1906	Succeeded by William H. Frecker
