= Seal of Tampa =

The Seal of the City of Tampa

The Seal of the City of Tampa is Tampa government's official seal. The seal was made in Italy in the 1920s by Val Antuono, Sr.

== Design ==
In the center of the seal is a (historically inaccurate) depiction of the SS Mascotte, which was owned by Henry B. Plant and was named after the operetta La mascotte by Edmond Audran. The ship (along with its sister ship Olivette, which was also named for an opera by Audran) ran between Tampa, Key West, and Cuba from the mid-1880s until the early 1900s. It was in that capacity that it brought thousands of immigrants and regular shipments of clear Havana tobacco to Ybor City and West Tampa, helping to make Tampa the Cigar Capital of the World

The outside parameter of the city seal shows the "City of Tampa Florida" and "July 15, 1887", the date on which the city was organized under a special act of the Florida Legislature. The seal shown was created by Margaret Joan Hug, a city of Tampa employee. The seal shown was created by Margaret Joan Hug, a city of Tampa employee, who is credited with updating the seal.

== See also ==
- Flag of Tampa, Florida
