= Dover, Florida =

- CDP
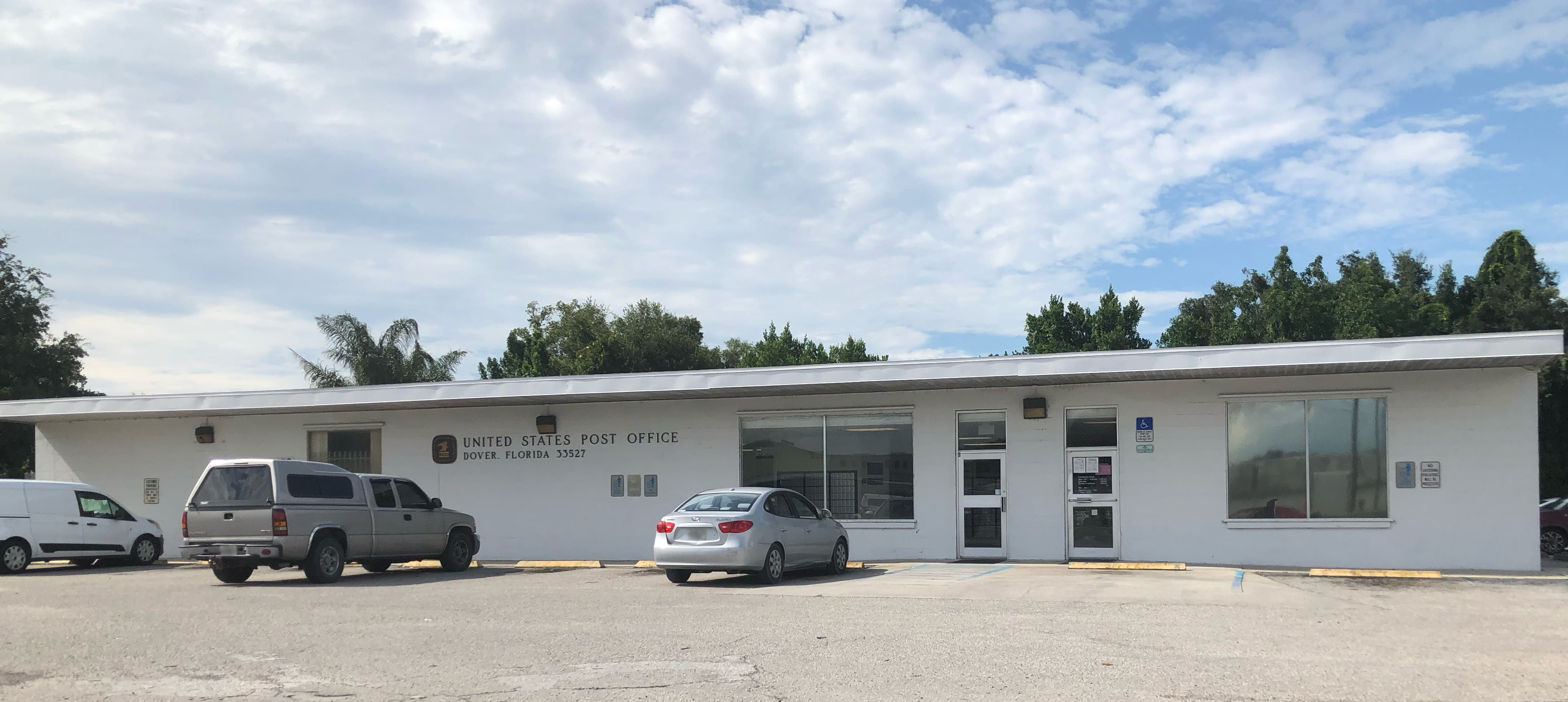
- Post office

- Location in Hillsborough County and the state of Florida
- Coordinates: 27°59′50″N 82°13′01″W
- Country: United States
- State: Florida
- County: Hillsborough

Area
  - Total: 2.64 sq mi (6.84 km^{2})
  - Land: 2.60 sq mi (6.74 km^{2})
  - Water: 0.039 sq mi (0.10 km^{2})
- Elevation: 98 ft (30 m)

Population (2020)
  - Total: 3,266
  - Density: 1,255.5/sq mi (484.75/km^{2})
- Time zone: UTC-5 (Eastern (EST))
  - Summer (DST): UTC-4 (EDT)
- ZIP code: 33527
- Area code: 813
- FIPS code: 12-18075
- GNIS feature ID: 2402412

Dover is an unincorporated census-designated place in Hillsborough County, Florida, United States. The population was 3,266 at the 2020 census, down from 3,702 at the 2010 census.

== Geography ==
Dover is a Tampa suburb located approximately 24 miles from the city's central business district. It is 6 miles west of Plant City and 7 miles northeast of Brandon. According to the United States Census Bureau, the community has a total area of 2.6 square miles (6.7 km^{2}), of which 2.6 square miles (6.7 km^{2}) is land and 0.04 square miles (0.10 km^{2}) (1.14%) is water.

== Demographics ==
Historical population
Census	Pop.	Note	%±
1970	2,094		—
1980	2,354		12.4%
1990	2,626		11.6%
2000	2,798		6.5%
2010	3,702		32.3%
2020	3,266		−11.8%

=== 2020 census ===
As of the 2020 census, Dover had a population of 3,266. The median age was 29.8 years. 34.1% of residents were under the age of 18 and 9.2% of residents were 65 years of age or older. For every 100 females there were 109.4 males, and for every 100 females age 18 and over there were 109.4 males age 18 and over.

97.9% of residents lived in urban areas, while 2.1% lived in rural areas.

There were 890 households in Dover, of which 45.7% had children under the age of 18 living in them. Of all households, 51.3% were married-couple households, 18.4% were households with a male householder and no spouse or partner present, and 22.0% were households with a female householder and no spouse or partner present. About 15.2% of all households were made up of individuals and 5.7% had someone living alone who was 65 years of age or older.

There were 971 housing units, of which 8.3% were vacant. The homeowner vacancy rate was 1.4% and the rental vacancy rate was 4.4%.

Racial composition as of the 2020 census
Race	Number	Percent
White	1,285	39.3%
Black or African American	36	1.1%
American Indian and Alaska Native	63	1.9%
Asian	17	0.5%
Native Hawaiian and Other Pacific Islander	1	0.0%
Some other race	1,189	36.4%
Two or more races	675	20.7%
Hispanic or Latino (of any race)	2,330	71.3%

=== 2000 census ===
As of the census of 2000, there were 2,798 people, 751 households, and 615 families residing in the community. The population density was 1,070.7 people per square mile (413.9/km^{2}). There were 842 housing units at an average density of 322.2 per square mile (124.4/km^{2}). The racial makeup of the community was 74.12% White, 0.43% African American, 1.04% Native American, 0.61% Asian, 0.25% Pacific Islander, 19.12% from other races, and 4.43% from two or more races. Hispanic or Latino of any race were 50.86% of the population.

There were 751 households, out of which 45.4% had children under the age of 18 living with them, 63.2% were married couples living together, 10.9% had a female householder with no husband present, and 18.1% were non-families. 10.4% of all households were made up of individuals, and 4.3% had someone living alone who was 65 years of age or older. The average household size was 3.69 and the average family size was 3.89.

In the community the population was spread out, with 33.0% under the age of 18, 13.0% from 18 to 24, 30.3% from 25 to 44, 17.0% from 45 to 64, and 6.8% who were 65 years of age or older. The median age was 28 years. For every 100 females there were 115.2 males. For every 100 females age 18 and over, there were 117.0 males.

The median income for a household in the community was $31,333, and the median income for a family was $31,851. Males had a median income of $28,090 versus $18,472 for females. The per capita income for the community was $10,728. About 22.3% of families and 28.0% of the population were below the poverty line, including 34.4% of those under age 18 and 20.2% of those age 65 or over.

== Education ==
- Two elementary schools located in the area are Bailey and Dover.
- Strawberry Crest High School, the home of the Chargers, is the first high school in Dover, having its first graduating class in 2011. It is also an IB school (the fourth in Hillsborough County).
- Independence Academy on U.S. 92 opened in 2015 or 2016.

== Notable people ==
- George B. Sparkman, 19th and 21st mayor of Tampa (1881–1883, 1887–1888)
- Mel Tillis, country singer
