= Madison Post =

American politician (1815–1867)

5th Mayor of Tampa
- In office February 10, 1858 – February 12, 1859
- Preceded by: Darwin A. Branch
- Succeeded by: James McKay Sr.

Personal details
- Born: January 22, 1815
- Died: September 10, 1867 (aged 52) Tampa, Florida
- Party: Know Nothing
- Relations: Duff Post (son)

Madison Post (January 22, 1815 – September 10, 1867) was the fifth mayor of Tampa, Florida, and the father of Duff Post, who was himself mayor of Tampa for several years during two nonconsecutive periods in office. Madison Post was mayor from February 10, 1858 until February 12, 1859.

Post was born in New Jersey and moved to Tampa in 1849, a year after the great hurricane of 1848 destroyed much of Tampa. He worked as the manager of the Tampa Hotel and eventually purchased a general store on Lafayette Street (now Kennedy Boulevard).

Post was a member of the "Know-Nothings" and a supporter of slavery. Post was also anti-immigration and anti-Catholic in his politics. He was appointed as Receiver of Public Moneys for Hillsborough County in 1854. He joined Dr. Darwin Branch and Edward Clarke as delegates to the American Party's Presidential Convention which nominated former President Millard Fillmore.

Post and the council increased license fees and established new ordinances to re-establish Tampa's finances. Post enlisted as a private in the Confederate Infantry during the U.S. Civil War and served as a Confederate Deputy Marshall in Florida and as a tax assessor for Florida's Confederate government.

Madison Post died in Tampa on September 10, 1867.
