= Auguste Charles Valadier =

Franco-American dental surgeon

Sir Auguste Charles Valadier (12 January 1871–31 August 1931) was a Franco-American dental surgeon who pioneered new techniques and equipment for treating maxillofacial injuries of soldiers during World War I.

== Early life ==
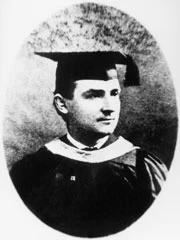
Auguste Charles Valadier

Valadier was born in Paris, France in 1871, the son of Marie-Antoinette née Parade and Charles Jean-Baptiste Valadier, a pharmacist. In 1878 he and his two younger brothers were taken to live in the United States by his parents. Here he attended Dr Sachs' Collegiate Institute before studying dental surgery at Columbia University (1882-1892), taking his B.A.. He received his M.A. in 1895. He entered the Philadelphia Dental College as a student in about 1898, and qualified as Doctor of Dental Surgery (DDS) in 1901. He next took the State examinations which allowed him to practice in Pennsylvania and New York, practicing in the latter for five years. In July 1899 in Philadelphia he married Marion Stowe. The marriage was later dissolved.

== Return to Paris ==
By 1910 Valadier's mother was widowed and wealthy and living in Paris, and on the death of her other son she persuaded Valadier to join her there. As he had no French dental qualifications, Valadier studied at l'Ecole Odontotechnique de Paris from November 1910 to June 1911, and received the certificate of Chirugien Dentiste from the Faculty of Medicine of the University of Paris in July 1912, following which he was permitted to practice in France. In July 1913 he married Alice Wright, the granddaughter of Robert Clinton Wright, a former United States Minister in Brazil.

== World War I ==
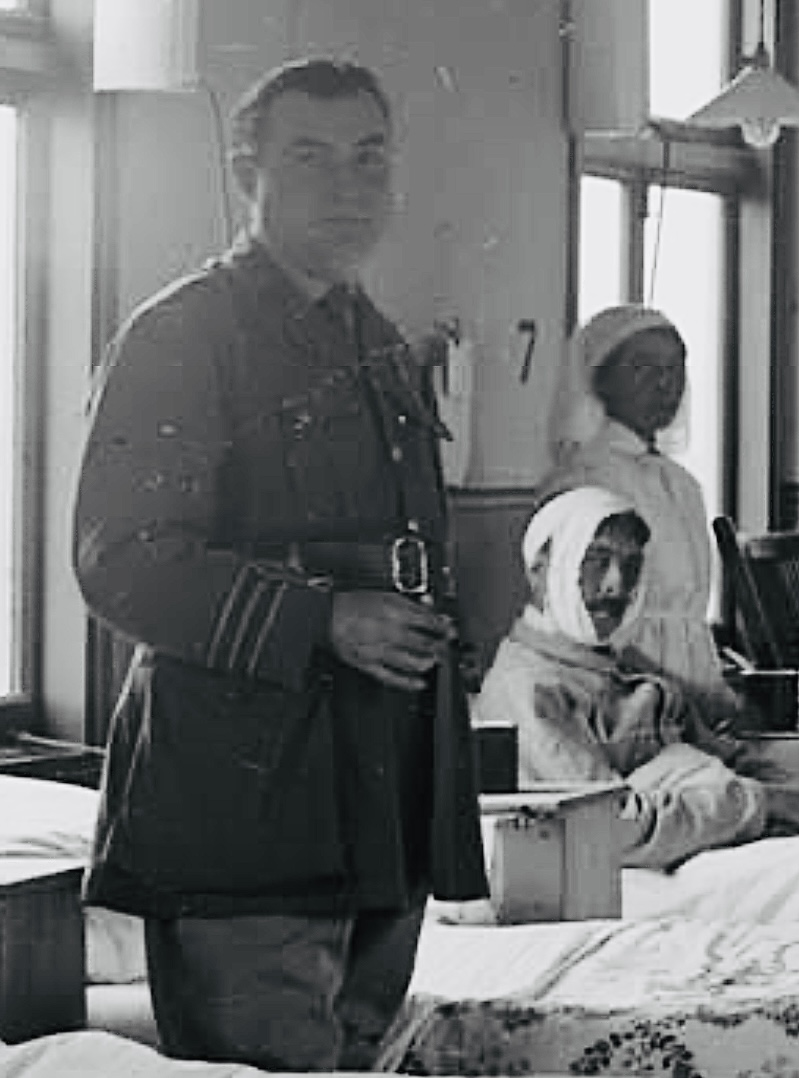
Major Sir Auguste Charles Valadier (left) at No.13 Stationary Hospital. 6th October 1916

On the outbreak of World War I, in October 1914 Valadier joined the British Red Cross Society (BRCS) in Paris who sent him to Abbeville. The History of the Great War (1922) records: "Dental surgeons commenced to arrive in France in early November and were allocated to clearing hospitals and to the bases. An eminent dentist, M. Valadier, a citizen of the United States, who had been sent from Paris to Abbeville by the BRCS, was also accepted for duty with the British troops on 29 October." Valadier seems to have been the first dental surgeon to have provided dental treatment for the British troops in France. The dental surgeons sent over by the War Office were given temporary commissions while attached to the Royal Army Medical Corps, and Valadier was gazetted as an honorary Lieutenant, and in 1916 was promoted to Major.

By early 1915 Valadier had set up a 50-bed oral surgery unit attached to the 83rd (Dublin) General Hospital at Wimereux for the treatment of facial injuries. Much of this reconstructive work was done out of his own pocket, while his own staff in his dental laboratory in Paris fashioned the appliances necessary for the treatment of severe injuries to the jaw. As he was not a surgeon himself it was thought necessary that in the operating theatre Valadier would require the assistance of a trained surgeon, and so Harold Gillies joined his team. It is uncertain how long Gillies worked with Valadier, but it was certainly long enough to inspire in Gillies the interest to learn more about this radical new medical treatment.

In his book The Principles and Art of Plastic Surgery (1957), Gillies wrote of Valadier:

In Boulogne there was a great fat man with sandy hair and a florid face, who had equipped his Rolls Royce with dental chair, drills and the necessary heavy metals. The name of this man whose high brown riding boots carried a polish equal to the glitter of his spurs was Charles Valadier. He toured about until he had filled with gold all the remaining teeth in British GHQ. With the Generals strapped in his chair, he convinced them of the need of a plastic and jaw unit, and one was set up nearby in the lovely little town of Wimereux. I was invited by Valadier to accompany him to assist in his initial incision... The credit for establishing the first Plastic and Jaw Unit, which so facilitated the later progress of plastic surgery, must go to the remarkable linguistic talents of the smooth and genial Sir Charles Valadier.

On 17 May 1915 The Daily Sketch reported on a case of reconstructive surgery performed by Valadier:

WAR'S MOST WONDERFUL SURGICAL FEAT
Wounded Highlander Who Was Given A New Mouth

Surely the most wonderful surgical feat of the war so far must be that achieved by Lieut. Valadier, R.A.M.C., for a Highlander.

The story was told the Daily Sketch yesterday at the fascinating exhibition of fracture apparatus now being held on the premises of the Royal Society of Medicine, London.

At Neuve Chapelle the Highlander was hit, and the simplest way to describe what happened to him is to say that he lost his mouth.

He was looking up when a piece of shell struck him in the left cheek. It passed through his top lip, shattered the upper jaw, fell upon the lower jaw, and smashed that. Then it glanced off and buried itself into his right shoulder.

SKILFUL ARMY SURGEON

Taken to hospital, the Highlander had the good fortune to fall into the hands of Lieutenant Valadier, who is a Frenchman by birth. He has studied in the States, and is now attached to the Royal Army Medical Corps.

The patient's mouth was just a shapeless mess. Lieutenant Valadier was able to provide an artificial mouth-floor, and then, by using a special type of splints, to draw the sides into position again. The jaws were in some marvellous manner reset, and the man was given new teeth.

Now he can eat and speak as well as ever, and has only one light scar to show that anything has ever happened to him.

Valadier wrote or co-authored various papers concerning the surgical treatment of injuries to the teeth and jaws. These included A Report on Oral and Plastic Surgery and on Prosthetic Appliances (1917), written with the rhinologist Captain George Harold Lawson Whale RAMC (1876-1943) and taken from their findings in observing the treatment of over a thousand cases of injuries to the faces of troops. By 1918 Valadier's influence was waning as troops with severe facial injuries were sent direct from the trenches to Harold Gillies in England, firstly to his facial reconstruction unit at Aldershot and later Sidcup.

== After the War ==
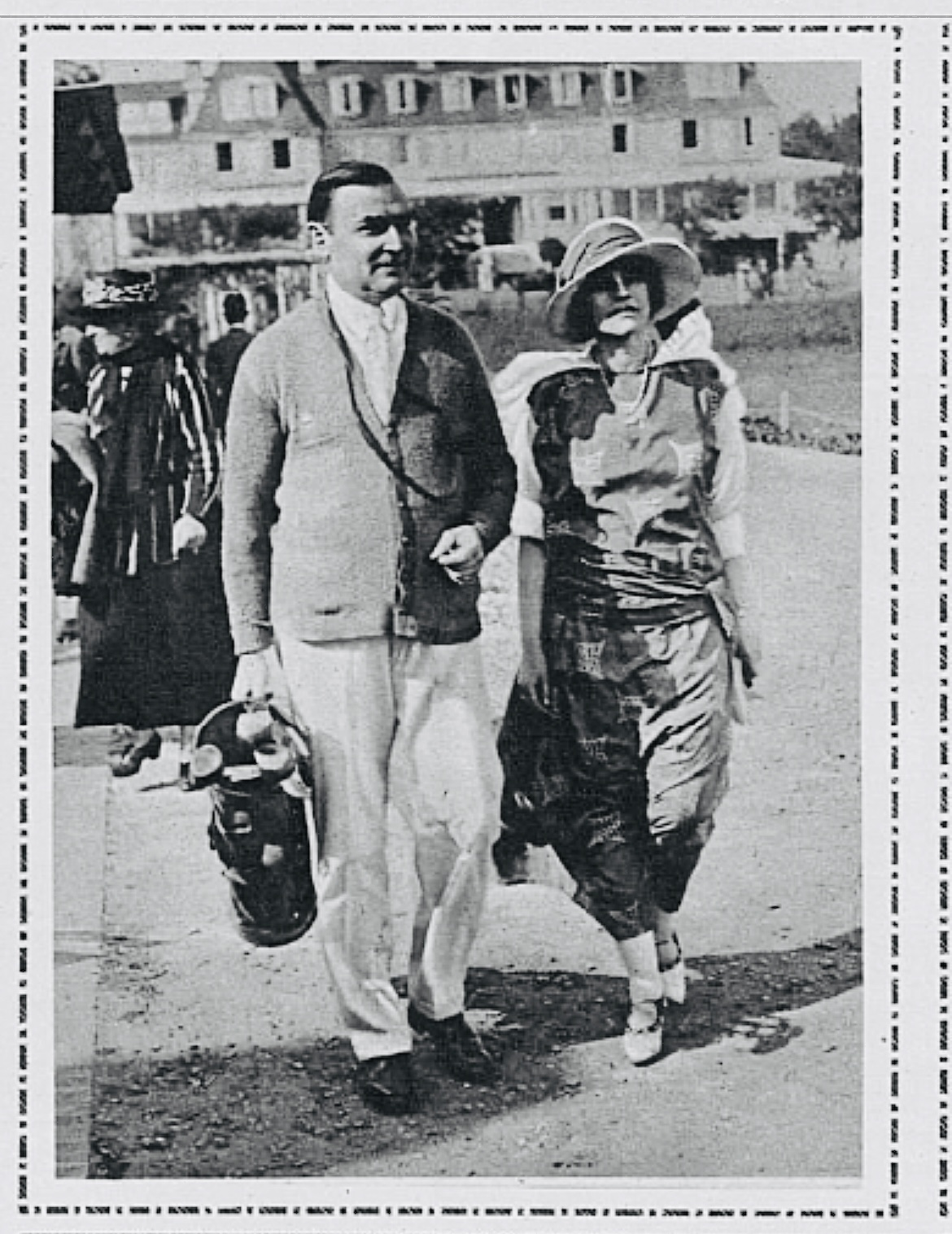
Sir Auguste Charles Valadier and Lady Valadier in 1922

The War Office likely stood Valadier down from his medical duties in 1919, and by early 1920 he was back in Paris. He applied for and received the 1914 Star, the British War Medal and the Victory Medal with three Mentioned in Despatches (MiD) emblems. In February 1920, in recognition of his service during the War, Valadier was made a Knight Commander of the Order of the British Empire by the British government, but as a French national the award was purely honorary. He had been appointed a Companion of the Order of St Michael and St George (CMG) in June 1916, and an Associate of the Order of St John of Jerusalem in January 1917. In 1919 he was made a Chevalier of the Legion of Honour by the government of France. Valadier applied for British citizenship, and in recognition of his service to the British Army it was granted on 16 March 1920. He was finally knighted by George V on 8 March 1921.

During the 1920s Valadier resumed his dental practice in Paris where he was President of the American Dental Club of Paris. Having been left financially well-off by his mother, Valadier lived well, even extravagantly. His dental practice was a success and he employed a number of assistants. However, he had a taste for gambling for high stakes, and this eventually ruined him. He developed a disorder of the blood, possibly leukemia, which forced him to retire. However, he was addicted to gambling and found himself heavily in debt. He died destitute on 31 August 1931.
