= Bingham Military School =

Defunct school in North Carolina, US

Coordinates: 36.430256°N 78.431938°W

The Bingham Military School was the state of North Carolina's first military school, founded in 1826 by Capt. D. H. Bingham to provide more accessible training for military officers. The school opened its doors in January 1827, with Bingham as its superintendent and Capt. Patridge, who had served in the French Army, as its head instructor. The school relocated twice, first from Williamsborough to Littleton in 1829, and then later that year from Littleton to Oxford.

The school initially opened to some popularity. However, it soon came under fire by the newspaper The Star due to its young educators and the frequent absence of Capt. Patridge, who was more qualified. The school moved again to Raleigh in 1831, shortly before Bingham left the school for a position with a railroad company in Alabama in 1833. Finally, in 1836, the school moved to Wilmington. The school shut down fairly soon afterward.

It is sometimes mistaken for the Bingham School or the Hillsborough Academy. It should not be confused with another school operating under the name established in Mebane, North Carolina, in 1865. The Bingham School of Mebane split in 1891 after a disagreement between the brothers who owned the school, with the Robert Bingham School relocating to Asheville and the Mebane-based branch becoming known as the William Bingham School.

== Notable alumni ==
- Nelson Phillips (1873–1939), judge on the Supreme Court of Texas
- Perry G. Wall II (1867–1944), businessman and mayor of Tampa, Florida
- George Francis Willis (1880–1932), a millionaire who made his fortune in patent medicines
