= Strawberry Crest High School =

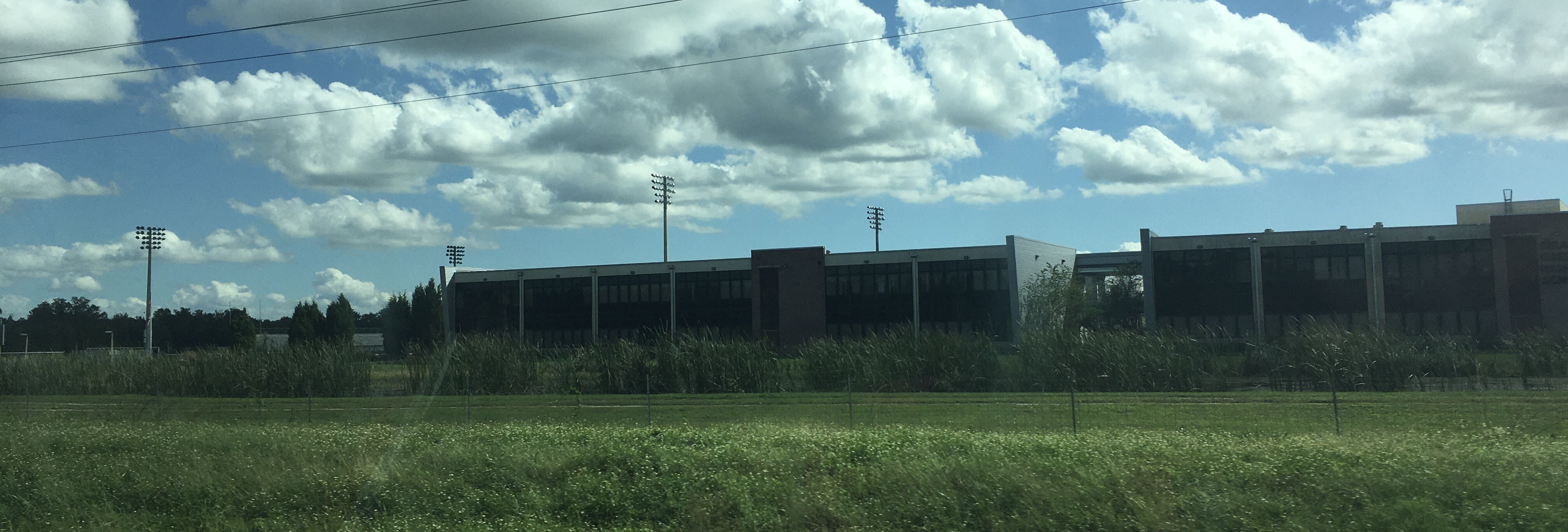

Location
- 4691 Gallagher Road; Dover, Florida 33527; United States; 28°01′23″N 82°14′11″W

Information
- Type: Public high school
- Opened: 2009
- School district: Hillsborough County Public Schools
- Principal: Mark Watson
- Teaching staff: 105.50 (FTE)
- Grades: 9–12
- Enrollment: 2,558 (2022–23)
- Student to teacher ratio: 24.25
- Colors: Red, Black, and Silver
- Nickname: Chargers
- Website: www.hillsboroughschools.org/o/strawberrycrest

Strawberry Crest High School is a public high school in East Hillsborough County, Florida, United States. It opened on August 25, 2009, to relieve overcrowding at Armwood High School, Durant High School, and Plant City High School. Strawberry Crest is the fourth high school in Hillsborough County to be certified as an International Baccalaureate (IB) high school. A number of the instructors for the IB courses come from the International Baccalaureate Program at the older C. Leon King High School in Tampa.

Mark Watson is the current principal. Former principal David Brown left the school in 2019 to move to the district's newest high school in 10 years and was replaced by Christie Raburn, who herself left in 2023.

The school is located at the intersection of Gallagher Road and 92 in Dover, Florida, on land that was once the family farm of longtime school board member Joe E. Newsome. Chargers are the school mascot, similar to the logo of the NFL team Denver Broncos, although dressed in the school colors which are red, black, and silver. The school was named Strawberry Crest in order to honor the strawberry growers of the region.

== Strawberry Crest Music Program ==
The band and orchestra programs at Strawberry Crest were under the direction of Cheri A. Sleeper from the school's opening until her retirement in 2025, leaving the band program under the direction of Timothy Trice and the orchestra program under Damian Johnson. The marching band has participated in many band competitions over the years and has consistently received "Superior" ratings.
