= George B. Sparkman =

American politician

George Bascom Sparkman

19th & 22nd Mayor of Tampa
- In office July 15, 1887 – March 8, 1888
- Preceded by: Matthew E. Haynsworth
- Succeeded by: Duff Post
- In office March 22, 1881 – August 14, 1883
- Preceded by: Herman Glogowski
- Succeeded by: Herman Glogowski

Personal details
- Born: September 20, 1855 Dover, Florida, U.S.
- Died: August 31, 1898 (aged 42) Tampa, Florida, U.S.
- Cause of death: Yellow fever
- Party: Democratic
- Children: George B. Sparkman Jr. (son)

George Bascom Sparkman (September 20, 1855 – August 31, 1898) was an American attorney who twice served as mayor of Tampa, Florida: 1881–1883 and 1887–1888.

== Early years ==
George Bascom Sparkman was born on September 20, 1855, in Dover, Florida, to Elijah Bird Sparkman and Sarah Ann Mizell. He attended high school in Tampa and entered the University of Virginia Law School.

== Mayor ==
=== First term ===
Henry Clarke Farris had moved outside the city limits, violating the city charter. He was forced to resign on February 19, 1881. City Council President Matthew Haynesworth became acting mayor until March 22, 1881, when Sparkman was appointed by the city council and sworn in to complete Farris's term.

=== Second term ===
The charter was revised in April 1887; Sparkman was the first mayor under the new municipal government. He would win in a close race by 14 votes despite accusations of attempting to sway the election by local newspapers and residents. That month, the charters of Tampa and North Tampa were replaced with one new all encompassing one. In the new charter, it stated that municipal government was to be overseen with a mayor and eleven council members. Three of the council members would be elected at-large while the other eight would come each of the city's four wards with two council members per ward. The city marshal, clerk, treasurer, tax assessor and tax collector would also be elected positions in the new charter.

The city would elect its first Latino city council member, Candido Angel Ybor, the son of Vicente Martinez Ybor during his second term in office. Another notable event occurring during his second term was the adoption of Tampa's present city seal.

== Later and personal life ==
After his time in office as mayor, he would serve as the Judge of the Sixth Circuit Court from 1893 to 1894.

Sparkman was a member of the Independent Order of Odd Fellows and the Knights of Pythias. He would be married to Mary Kershaw and they would have 7 children.

Sparkman would die of yellow fever on August 31, 1898, in Tampa.
