= Maurice H. Kornberg School of Dentistry =

Temple University dental school, Philadelphia

Coordinates: 40.002°N 75.152°W

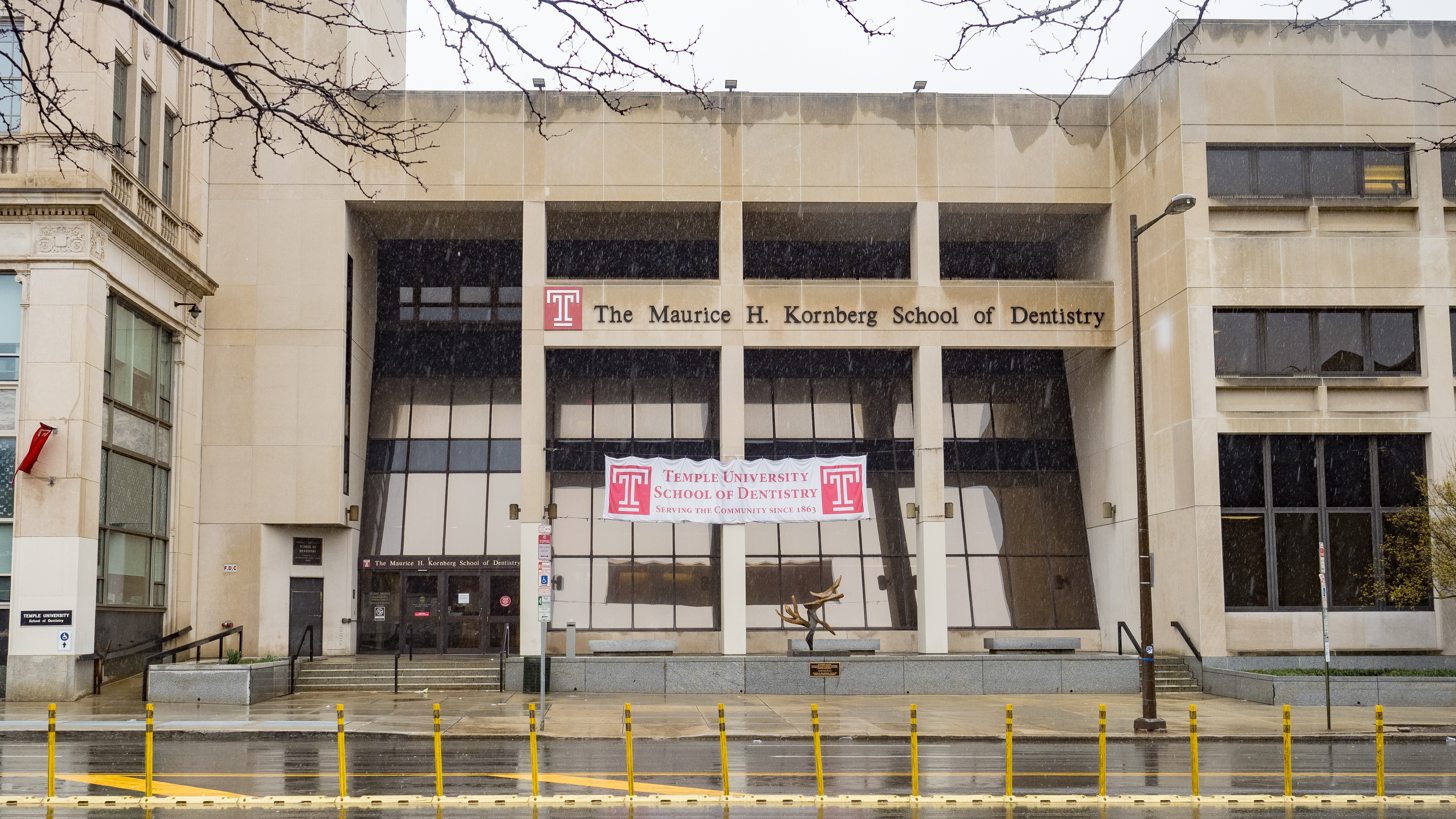
- Type: State-related
- Established: 1863; 163 years ago
- Dean: Amid I. Ismail, BDS, MBA, DrPH
- Location: Philadelphia, Pennsylvania, U.S.
- Website: dentistry.temple.edu

The Maurice H. Kornberg School of Dentistry (commonly referred to as Kornberg School of Dentistry) is the dental school of Temple University, located in Philadelphia, Pennsylvania, United States. It is one of several dental schools in the state of Pennsylvania. The average incoming class is 140 students.

== History ==
Maurice H. Kornberg School of Dentistry was established in 1863 as Philadelphia Dental College and is the second-oldest continually functioning dental school in the country. The school became part of Temple University in 1907. The Philadelphia Dental College changed its name to the Temple University School of Dentistry in 1913. In 1947, the school moved from Hamilton Street to Broad Street and Allegheny Avenue. The school's name was changed in December 2006 after a $10 million donation by the estate of Maurice H. Kornberg.

The school, still located at Broad Street and Allegheny Avenue in North Philadelphia, is known for its clinical experience as well as community involvement. Kornberg has completed extensive renovations to the school that include a new Orthodontics department as well as a new Pediatrics department and entire restorative department. This is due to the expansion efforts of the dean with support from the school's Board of Visitors and Alumni.

== Academics ==
Maurice H. Kornberg School of Dentistry awards Doctor of Dental Medicine degrees.

The school also allows students to earn both Doctor of Dental Medicine and Master of Business Administration degrees in four or five years through a special program.

== Departments ==
Maurice H. Kornberg School of Dentistry includes the following departments:

- Dental Public Health Sciences
- Endodontics
- Oral Maxillofacial Pathology Medicine and Surgery
- Orthodontics
- Pediatric Dentistry
- Periodontology and Oral Implantology
- Restorative Dentistry
- Oral Health Sciences

== Accreditation ==
Maurice H. Kornberg School of Dentistry is currently accredited by the American Dental Association.

== Alumni ==
- Duff Post, served as mayor of Tampa, Florida
- J. Holmes Jackson, served as mayor of Burlington, Vermont
- Dr. W. Xavier Sudduth, served as dean of the dental school at the University of Minnesota
- Alice Harvie Duden (1873–1926), first woman lecturer at the Indiana Dental College
- Auguste Charles Valadier (1873–1931), pioneering dental surgeon during WWI
- Charles H. Roberts (1872–1967), first of two African Americans elected to the New York City Board of Aldermen

== See also ==
- American Student Dental Association
