= Donald Brenham McKay =

American newspaper editor and politician (1868–1960)

38th & 42nd Mayor of Tampa
- In office January 3, 1928 – October 27, 1931
- In office June 6, 1910 – June 10, 1920

Personal details
- Born: July 29, 1868 Tampa, Florida
- Died: September 8, 1960 (aged 92) Tampa, Florida
- Cause of death: Heart failure
- Party: White Municipal Party
- Relations: James McKay Sr. (grandfather)

Donald Brenham McKay (July 29, 1868 – September 8, 1960) was the owner and editor of the Daily Times newspaper in Tampa, Florida and served several terms as Mayor of Tampa from 1910 to 1920 and from 1928 to 1931.

== Life and career ==
McKay was born in Tampa on July 29, 1868. His grandfather was James McKay Sr., who also served as Mayor of Tampa. His father served as a county commissioner.

He married Aurora Gutierrez, daughter of Gabino Gutierrez, in 1900. They had eight children.

He was a leading organizer of the whites only White Municipal Party and the first mayor of Tampa elected under its influence. The party excluded African Americans from meaningful involvement in Tampa's municipal elections for decades. As mayor he led infrastructure projects including street paving, sidewalk construction, brick firehouses, Tampa City Hall, and the fairgrounds.

In 1910, the International Socialist Review accused him of targeting union workers and said the streets of Tampa were not safe to walk with him as mayor. On December 30, 1913, he would welcome Tony Jannus after his airboat flight from St. Petersburg to Tampa, the first commercial flight in the U.S.

During World War I, President Woodrow Wilson appointed McKay to serve as the chairman of the President's Advisory Committee for Southwest Florida.

In 1928, he attended the dedication of a bridge to Davis Island.

Starting in 1946 and until his death, he wrote the column "Pioneer Florida" which was published in The Tampa Tribune.

During his life served as the President of the Tampa Board of Trade and be one of the founders/trustees of the University of Tampa.

McKay died of heart failure in Tampa, Florida on September 8, 1960.

== Legacy ==
The University of South Florida has a collection of his papers. The Florida State Archives have a photo of him. The University of Tampa's auditorium would be renamed as the Donald Brenham McKay auditorium in 1960.
