= Patrick C. Whitaker =

American politician

Patrick Crisp Whitaker (June 29, 1894 – September 14, 1965) was an American defense attorney who served in the Florida House of Representatives and Florida Senate including as Senate President. He led the defense of six Tampa policemen and the police chief accused of involvement in a deadly 1935 attack on a political group known as the Modern Democrats. His brother-in-law, R.E.L. Chancey was the Mayor of Tampa.

He was born in Franklin, Georgia, the eldest of five siblings born to Georgia state legislator Daniel Brittain Whitaker. He graduated with a law degree from Georgetown University in 1915. He set up a law firm in Tampa in 1917.

Whitaker was elected to the Florida House of Representatives in 1924 and the State Senate in 1926. He was re-elected in 1930 and served as Senate president from 1931 to 1933. He lost his re-election campaign in 1934, but won again in 1938.

Whitaker argued the case Hale v. Bimco Trading, Inc. before the Supreme Court in 1939. The case involved a charge against the Florida State Road Department enforcing a statute regulating cement inspection.

He liked scotch and cigars and was reputed to take out his false teeth during trials. In 1919 he famously got six young men cleared of a fishing violation by contending that since mullet have gizzards they are not fish, but some sort of aquatic fowl. As a result, state fishing regulations were reportedly revised to specifically mention mullet, regardless of whether fish or fowl.
