= Herman Glogowski =

American politician (1854–1909)

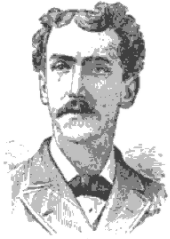

21st, 23rd, 25th & 28th Mayor of Tampa
- In office March 4, 1892 – March 10, 1893
- Preceded by: Duff Post
- Succeeded by: George B. Sparkman
- In office March 5, 1890 – March 4, 1891
- Preceded by: George B. Sparkman
- Succeeded by: Thomas Jackson
- In office March 8, 1888 – March 6, 1889
- Preceded by: George B. Sparkman
- Succeeded by: Duff Post
- In office August 13, 1886 – July 15, 1887
- Preceded by: Duff Post
- Succeeded by: Frederick A. Salomonson

Personal details
- Born: April 29, 1854 Wilhelmsbruck, Germany
- Died: December 3, 1909 (aged 55) Tampa, Florida, U.S.
- Party: Republican

Herman Glogowski (April 29, 1854 – December 3, 1909) was a four-time mayor of Tampa, Florida, in the later 1880s and early 1890s. He was first elected mayor on August 13, 1886, and served until July 15, 1887. He was elected again to a second term on March 8, 1888, and served until March 6, 1889. He was re-elected two terms and served from March 5, 1890, to March 4, 1891, and from March 4, 1892, to March 10, 1893. Glogowski is the only person in Tampa history to serve four terms as mayor non-consecutively. He was a Republican.

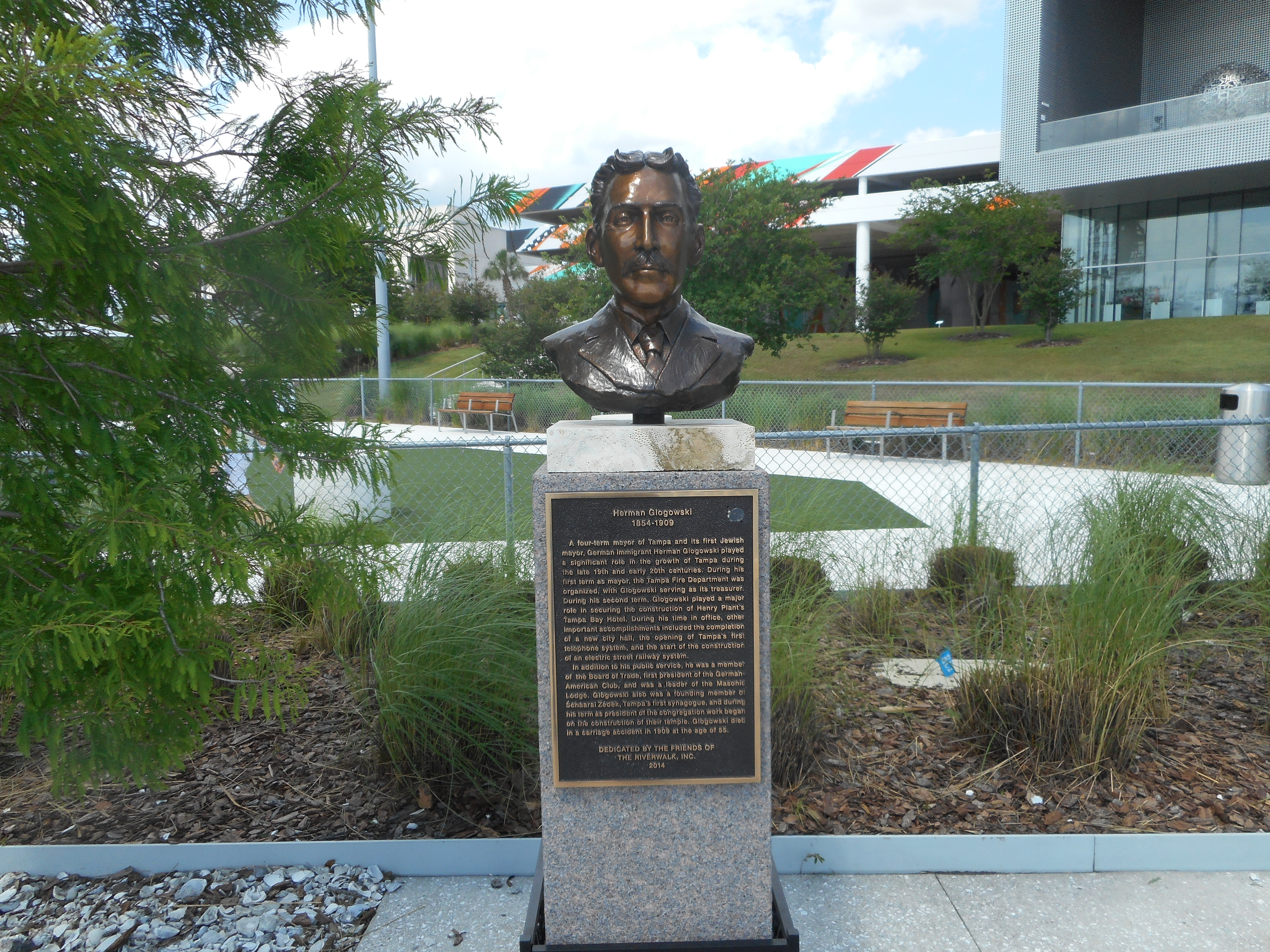
Bust of Gloglowski on Tampa's Riverwalk

== Early life ==
Glogowski was born in Germany to parents of Jewish descent. In 1867 he immigrated to the United States living in New York City where he worked in the city's garment industry for roughly 15 years. In late 1882, he would move to Gainesville, Florida, where he would marry Bertha Brown in 1883. After living in Gainesville for a year, Glogowski settled in Tampa and opened a men's orientated clothing store on Washington Street.

== Mayor of Tampa ==
Glogowski later got involved in local politics and was elected as the 21st mayor of Tampa for a one-year term in August 1886 being the first Jewish mayor of Tampa. He was elected again for another one-year term in March 1888. He then served two more terms as mayor of Tampa, from March 5, 1890, to March 4, 1891, and from March 4, 1892, to March 10, 1893.

== Later life ==
After his mayorship he remained active in the community. He laid the cornerstone for Tampa's first synagogue, Schaarai Zedek, in 1899.

He was killed in a horse and buggy accident in Tampa on December 3, 1909.

Political offices
Preceded by Duff Post	Mayor of Tampa; August 13, 1886-July 15, 1887	Succeeded by George B. Sparkman
Preceded by George B. Sparkman	Mayor of Tampa; March 8, 1888-March 6, 1889	Succeeded by Thomas Jackson
Preceded by Thomas Jackson	Mayor of Tampa; March 5, 1890-March 4, 1891	Succeeded by Duff Post
Preceded by Duff Post	Mayor of Tampa; March 4, 1892-March 10, 1893	Succeeded by Frederick A. Salomonson
