= James T. Magbee =

American lawyer and politician

James T. Magbee, known as J. T. Magbee, was a pioneer of Tampa, Florida, the town's first lawyer, and the federal collector of revenues at Tampa. Magbee was a Florida State Constitutional Convention delegate, a Florida State Senator, a newspaper editor and a judge of the Circuit Court. He owned slaves prior to the Civil War.

He edited the Tampa Guardian.

During the American Civil War, he prosecuted James McKay Sr., once mayor of Tampa and a cattleman, for treason against the Confederacy. McKay was accused of trading with the Union forces in Key West as well as being a Federal spy. The trial was postponed and McKay left Tampa only to be arrested by the Union for smuggling.

After the war Magbee became a "scalawag", a term of derision, when he changed affiliations from southern Democrats, to northern Republicans. Known for his public drunkenness, Tampa residents spread molasses and cornmeal on his unconscious body where it lay in the street and pigs reportedly ate off the sweet mixture along with some of the judge's clothes. He was impeached as a judge in early 1870. However, in January 1871, the impeachment was abandoned without an impeachment trial verdict.

Magbee is buried in downtown Tampa's Oaklawn Cemetery.
