= SS Florida (1931) =

American cruise liner

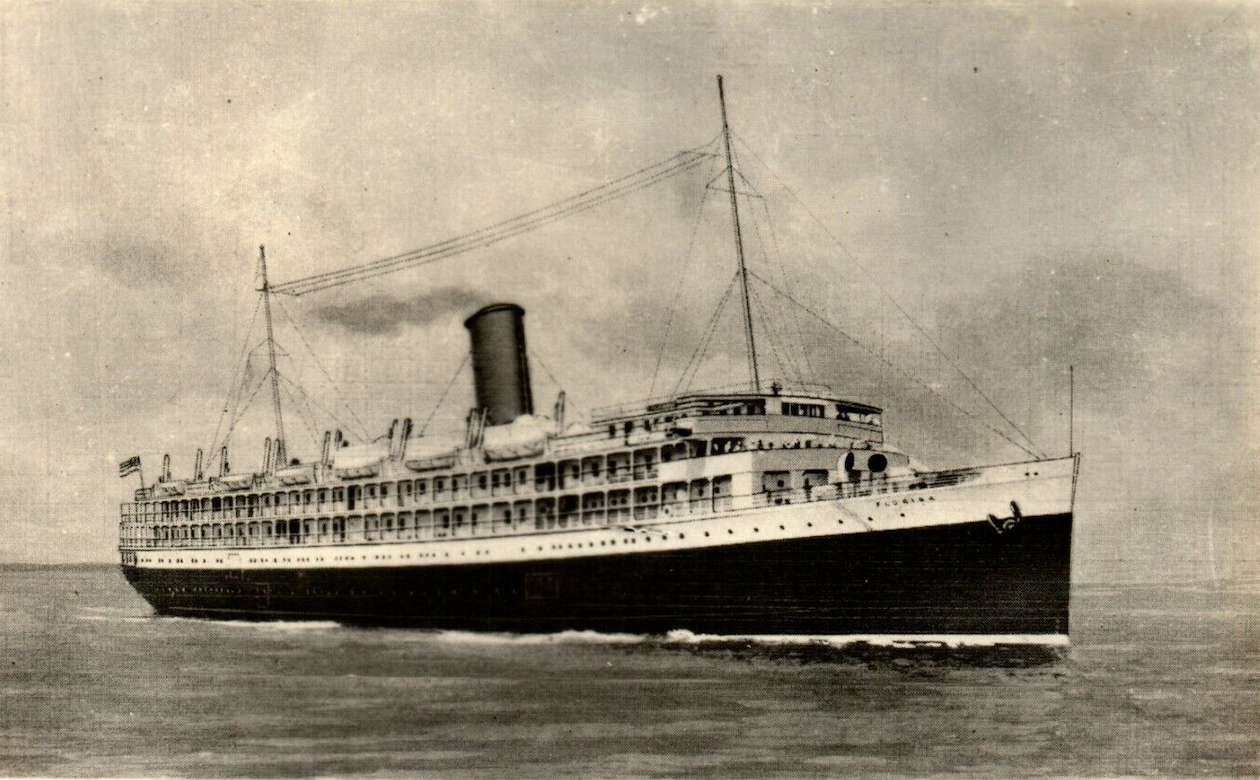
- Steamship Florida

History

United States
- Name: Florida
- Namesake: The state of Florida
- Operator: Peninsular & Occidental Steamship Company
- Route: Miami, Florida to Havana, Cuba
- Builder: Newport News Ship Building and Dry Dock Co., Newport News, Virginia
- Laid down: 1931
- Launched: 1931
- Fate: Transferred to War Shipping Administration (WSA), 1 January 1942

United States
- Name: Florida
- Operator: WSA (1 January 1942 to 6 March 1942); War Department (6 March 1942 to 17 July 1946)
- Acquired: 1 January 1942
- In service: 1 January 1942
- Out of service: 17 July 1946
- Fate: Returned to P & O Steamship Co., 17 July 1946

United States
- Name: Florida
- Operator: P & O Steamship Company
- Fate: Transferred to Liberian registry, September 1955

Panama
- Name: Florida
- Fate: Sold to Canadian owner, 1967

Canada
- Name: La Palais Flotant
- Fate: Scrapped in 1968, Santander, Spain

General characteristics
- Type: Transport
- Tonnage: 4,945 GT
- Length: 388 ft (118 m)
- Beam: 56 ft (17 m)
- Draft: 20 ft 1 in (6.12 m)
- Propulsion: 2 × Propellers
- Speed: 10.5 kn (19.4 km/h; 12.1 mph)
- Capacity: 14,800 cu ft (420 m^{3})
- Troops: 958 (wartime service)

SS Florida, was a steamship used by the Peninsular & Occidental Steamship Company as a transport between Cuba and Florida. At the end of its life, it was renamed La Palais Flotant, and used as a floating hotel in Quebec. The SS Florida was designed to carry 612 first-class passengers and 130 second-class passengers.

== Construction ==
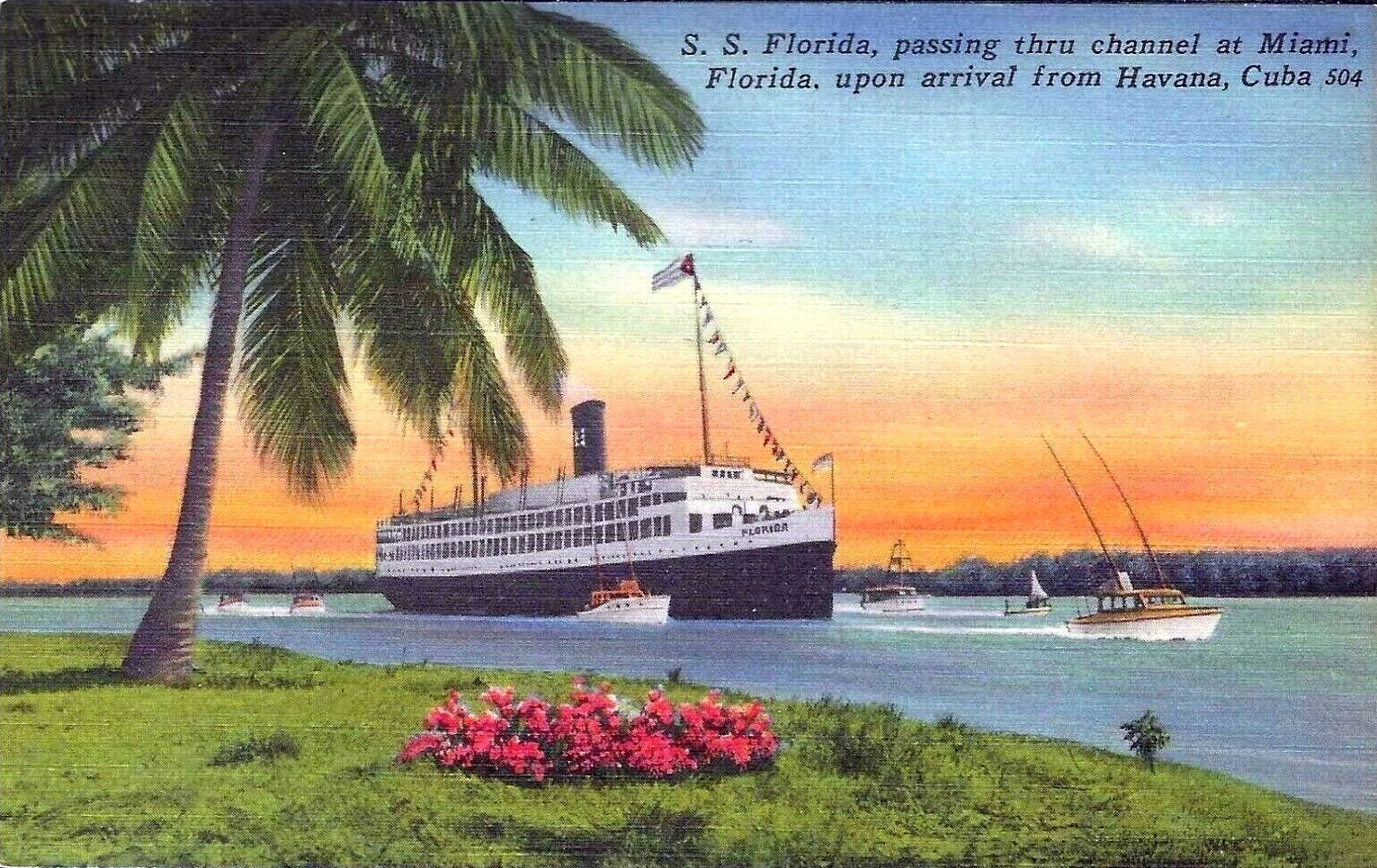
Steamship Florida postcard printed by the Peninsular & Occidental Steamship Company

The SS Florida was built by Newport News Shipbuilding, in Newport News, Virginia, in 1931, for service as a steam liner.

== Passenger service ==
Initially, when Florida joined the service of the Peninsular & Occidental Steamship Company, she served the Tampa – Key West – Havana route. In 1934, the ship's route was redirected to operate from Miami to Havana.

Photographer Joseph Janney Steinmetz captured various scenes aboard Florida during the late 1940s. His work, which documented American life across social classes, was featured in publications such as Life, Time, Holiday, and The Saturday Evening Post.

== World War II ==
Florida was requisitioned for service during World War II for a period of four years, after which it returned to civilian passenger service.

== Cruise liner ==
After World War II, the ship was converted into a one-class liner. Accommodations included 196 staterooms, most featuring upper and lower berths and wash basins. Some cabins had additional features such as sofa beds or extra upper berths. Only about 42 cabins included private bathrooms. Public amenities on board included a dining room, cocktail lounge, and a small ballroom. The ship was considered more spartan than its contemporaries, but it maintained a loyal customer base.

A brief service from Miami to Nassau, was attempted in 1954, to compete with the Eastern Steamship Lines, but the ship soon returned to its established Miami-Havana schedule. Florida was transferred to Liberian registry in 1955, due to increasing labor costs in the United States.

During the 1950s, a cruise from Miami to Havana, aboard Florida cost $42 per person, which included transportation, two nights aboard ship, a day in Havana, and all meals. The ship also carried automobiles, allowing Cuban passengers to bring their vehicles to the United States, for shopping and travel.

== Cuban Revolution ==
In 1959, with mounting political unrest in Cuba preceding the Cuban Revolution, the ship was permanently reassigned to a twice-weekly cruise service between Miami and Nassau. The ship's regular service to Havana ceased after the US embargo on Cuba in 1960, which prohibited American ships from calling at Cuban ports. Since then, cruise ships that visit Cuba are barred from docking in the United States for six months afterward. Florida was retired from service and laid up in 1966.

== La Palais Flotant ==
In 1967, Florida was renamed La Palais Flotant [sic], and operated as a hotelship for Expo 67, the world's fair held in the city of Montreal.

In 1968, the ship was moored at Île Charron, Longueuil, Quebec. Later that year, it arrived in Quebec City, and from there it was towed to Santander, Spain for the final ship breaking.

== See also ==
- SS Mascotte
