= William Henry Whitaker =

Early settler of Sarasota, Florida

William Whitaker
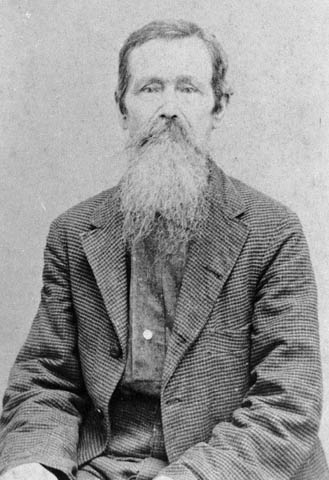
- Born: c. 1821; Savannah, Georgia, US
- Died: 1888; Sarasota, Florida, US
- Monuments: Whitaker Gateway Park and Whitaker Bayou
- Spouse: Mary Jane Wyatt
- Children: 12
- Relatives: Hamlin Valentine Snell (half brother), William Wyatt (father-in-law), Alexander Whitaker (descendant)

William Henry Whitaker (c. 1821–1888) was an American Seminole War veteran and Florida Cracker pioneer who, under the provisions of the Armed Occupation Act, established the first permanent settlement in what is now Sarasota, Florida. There he traded mullet with Cubans to bring the first groves of economically important oranges to the state. He later married Mary Jane Wyatt and with her raised Nancy Whitaker, the first child recorded in what now is the county of Sarasota and a family of eleven children. His father-in-law, William Wyatt, was a delegate to Florida's first constitutional convention in 1838. At the end of the Civil War, he helped Judah P. Benjamin escape to London.

Whitaker was an eighth-generation descendant of Jabez Whitaker, brother of Alexander Whitaker, the Jamestown colonist and theologian who baptized and performed the marriage of Pocahontas to John Rolfe.

== Early life ==
William Henry Whitaker was born in about 1821 in Savannah, Georgia, to Frances Snell, the second wife of Richard Whitaker. At the age of twelve, he left home with ten dollars and a gold pocket watch to St. Marks, Florida, one of the primary seaports of Territorial Florida's coast on the Gulf of Mexico. He worked there in the fishing trade and in time crossed paths with his half-brother Hamlin Valentine Snell, who later became President of the Florida Senate, Speaker of the House and later, Tampa's eighth mayor.

Living in Tallahassee, Snell committed William to a formal education, arranging lodging and board. It was in Tallahassee that he met his would-be wife Mary Jane Wyatt. In 1840, at age nineteen, Whitaker enlisted in Florida's Mounted Militia for three months to fight in the Second Seminole War. The occupation entry on his enlistment papers read "schoolboy". Whitaker served with his Regiment in Leon County, Monticello and at Fort Macomb on the Suwannee River. After his wartime service, Whitaker traveled Florida's Gulf Coast and to Havana, Cuba, working in the Cuban fishing trade.

== Sarasota ==
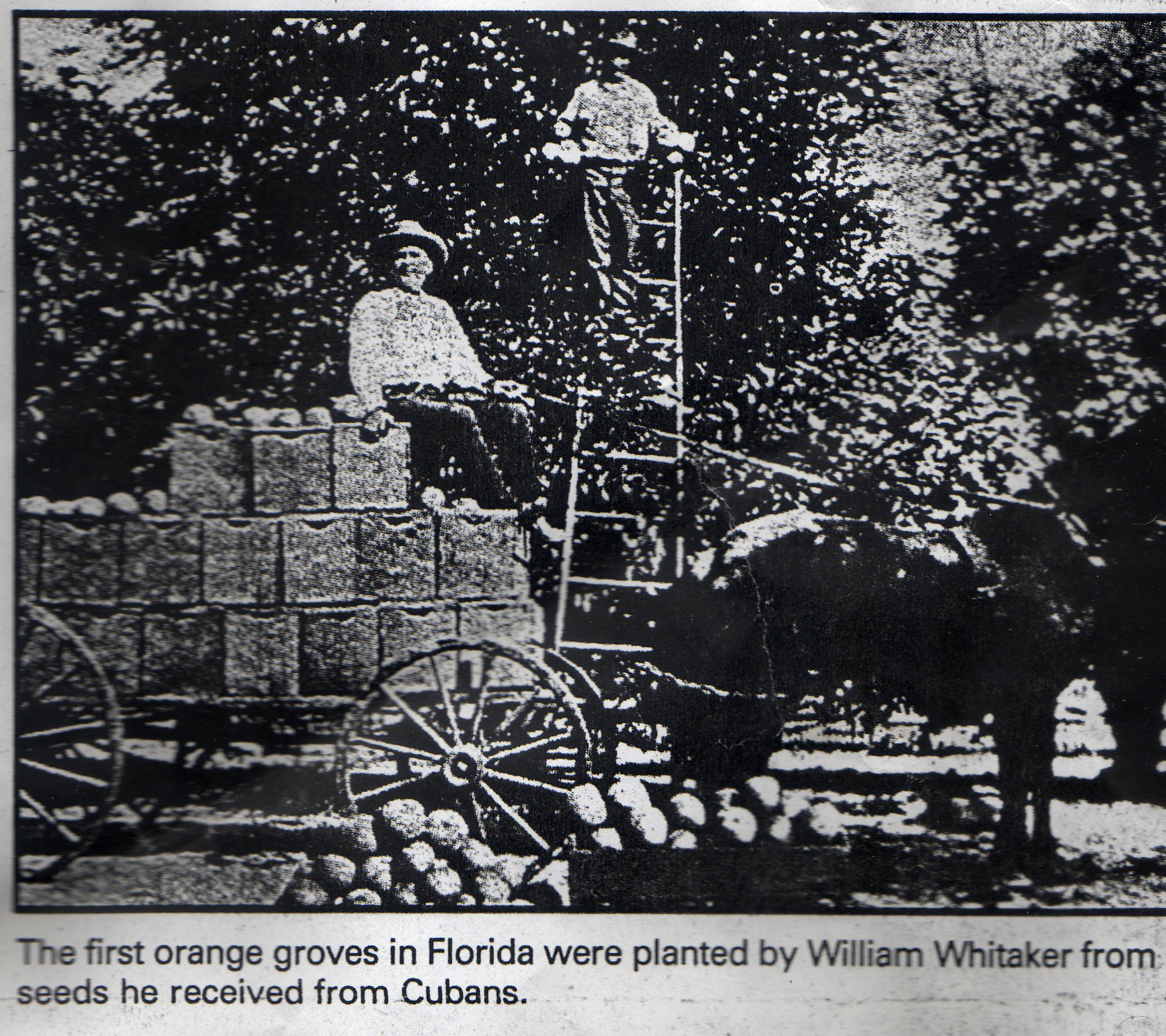

Although the western coast of the Florida peninsula had long been explored by the Spanish, few permanent settlements were established south of Gainesville (see Fort Brooke). Taking advantage of the Armed Occupation Act, Whitaker was given six months of provisions and the right to 160 acres (0.65 km^{2}), provided he built a home there and defended it for five years.

In December 1842, he and his half-brother sailed to what is now Yellow Bluffs overlooking Sarasota Bay; the high ground, the freshwater springs, and evidence of burial mounds proved the land would be ideal for a home. There he built a simple log cabin and began fishing and farming. Just to the north was a waterway (Whitaker Bayou) with a fresh flowing spring by its south bank. For a penny per fish, he traded with traveling Cubans, saving enough money to travel to the Brooksville-Dade City area to purchase Florida Cracker cattle. It was from the same Cuban traders that he secured oranges and guavas, planting the first commercial citrus groves in the state. He experimented with grafting oranges, dubbing his the "Whitaker Sweet".

He purchased his cattle in 1847, just two years after Florida achieved statehood, Whitaker took "47" as his brand to mark the date of his venture. He weathered the '46 hurricane and the Great Gale of 1848 in his cedar log house, calling the latter "the granddaddy of all hurricanes." The hurricane ripped a path through Longboat Key creating a new pass into Sarasota Bay, named by Whitaker as "New Pass", a name it still retains.

In 1851, he married his sweetheart, Mary Jane Wyatt, a pioneer resident of the village of Manatee (a settlement along the Manatee River about thirteen miles to the northeast of Yellow Bluffs) and the daughter of Col. William Wyatt. Their marriage and their first child, Nancy Catherine Stuart Whitaker, were the first of each recorded in what now are the records of Sarasota County. In that same year, with land warrant number 56934, he purchased 144.80 acres (0.5860 km^{2}) from the state, buying at the same time an additional 48.63 acres (196,800 m^{2}) for $1.25 each. In modern-day Sarasota, this land stretches from Indian Beach Drive south to Tenth Street. Alledgedly, the path he struck from Yellow Bluffs northward would become part of Tamiami Trail in 1926.

== Third Seminole War ==
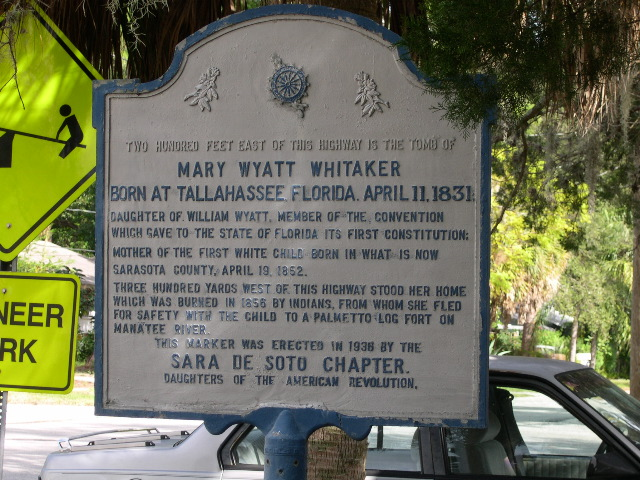

Mary Jane Wyatt Whitaker became acquainted with Holata Micco (Billy Bowlegs) while she was living at the Manatee River settlement. Reportedly when she asked the Alachua Seminole Chief if he would kill her in times of aggression, Bowlegs assured her that if he did, he would do so quickly.

During the Third Seminole War known as the "Billy Bowlegs War" Whitaker secured his family at Fort Branch also known as Camp Manatee near the village of Manatee. The Whitaker homestead at Sarasota was burned to the ground with a friend inside, George Owen.

Whitaker served as volunteer soldier in John Addison's Company and John Parker's Company of local militia from April to December of 1856. In the October 1856, Manatee County election Whitaker was elected Sheriff for a one-year term.

== Civil War ==
After rebuilding, the Whitakers were largely uninvolved with the raging American Civil War, despite Florida being the third state to secede from the Union. The Union push to destroy Confederate blockades succeeded in restricting goods to the frontier settlers, and union excursions inland from the Gulf of Mexico became more frequent. The blockade forced Whitaker to take the difficult three to four-week journey to Gainesville to buy grain for community use. Whitaker was one of three locals who had gristmills hidden deep in the woods. These became important to the community after Union troops destroyed the steam-operated one. Whitaker's cattle were driven along with other herds belonging to local ranchers by the Cow Cavalry to provide beef to the Confederate army.

As the war was nearing an end, Judah P. Benjamin, Secretary of State to the Confederacy, was being pursued through the Southern states. Making his way to Florida's west coast, John T. Lesley of Tampa escorted him by boat to the Gamble Plantation. Whitaker, sea captain Frederick Tresca, Confederate sailor Hiram McLeod (he served in Lesley's Confederate Company) and Benjamin made plans for securing a boat to be used in the secretary's escape. Though most boats had been destroyed or confiscated during the war, after two weeks a yawl was secured and stocked. Benjamin pushed off from Whitaker Bayou, making it to Bimini, safe from Union reach, and later to Nassau. From there he made it to London where he went on to serve in the Queen's Counsel.

== Later life ==

William Whitaker restricted himself to the homestead in his later years. His wife had borne eleven children, nine of whom survived. After a long life on the frontier, he died in 1888 at age 67 from injuries related to a fall from his horse. Mary Jane died in 1909. He and many of his descendants rest in the Whitaker Cemetery on 12th Street adjacent to Pioneer Park. The cemetery, surrounded by an Italian Renaissance balustrade, was given a marker (above), dedicated by the Daughters of the American Revolution, honoring the family's local history.

Nearly all of Whitaker's estate has been replaced by offices, homes and condominiums along the Sarasota coast. The inlet running through his family's homestead is still named Whitaker Bayou, and Whitaker Gateway Park exists in their honor.
