= Modern Democrats =

Former political party

The Modern Democrats were a political organization in Tampa, Florida. In 1935, members were arrested at a meeting and interrogated by police. Members of the group were then kidnapped outside the police station, beaten, tarred and feathered. Joseph Shoemaker died as a result of his wounds.

The attack and death made national news. Six Tampa policemen were indicted and accused of being Klansmen and taking part in the murder. The police chief was charged as an accessory for blocking the investigation. Five policemen were convicted of kidnapping at a trial held in Polk County. Patrick Crisp Whitacker, a former Senator and the brother-in-law of Tampa's mayor R.E.L. Chancey, served as the leading defense attorney. In 1937, the five officers had their kidnapping convictions overturned by the Supreme Court of Florida. They were tried for Shoemaker's murder, but acquitted. A retrial for the kidnapping also ended in an acquittal.

At the trial, the group denied it was Communist.

Shoemaker was from Vermont and organized the party after widespread corruption problems during Tampa's 1935 municipal election.

== See also ==
- Red Squad
