= Duff Post =

American dentist and politician (1854–1915)

20th & 26th Mayor of Tampa
- In office March 4, 1891 – March 4, 1892
- In office August 14, 1883 – August 13, 1886

Tampa City Marshall
- In office 1881–1883

President of the Hillsborough County Board of Health

Personal details
- Born: May 19, 1854 Tampa, Florida
- Died: May 19, 1915 (aged 61) Tampa, Florida
- Party: Democratic
- Parent: Madison Post (father)
- Occupation: Dentist, businessman

Duff Post (May 19, 1854 – May 19, 1915) was a dentist who served as mayor of Tampa, Florida (List of mayors of Tampa, Florida).

== Early life ==
Duff Post was born on May 19, 1854, in Tampa, Florida. He was the son of the 5th mayor of Tampa, Madison Post. Duff Post attended local schools before studying at Philadelphia Dental College to obtain a dentistry degree.

== Dentistry ==
Post established his dentistry practice in Tampa after graduating from college. Upon leaving office in 1892 he returned to his dentistry practice.

== Tampa politics ==
From there he'd first get involved with local politics and business. Post's first political office he would hold would be the President of the Hillsborough County Board of Health in 1873. He would serve as Tampa's City Marshal from 1881 to 1883, and was Captain in the 4th Regiment of the Florida Militia.

=== Mayor ===
As mayor, he would prioritize much of his overall work towards improving the city's sanitation.

He was first elected mayor on August 14, 1883, and served until August 13, 1886 (three consecutive one-year terms). Duff would be the second native of Tampa to hold that office. He was elected again to a second term on March 4, 1891, and served until March 4, 1892.

=== Postmaster ===
He is also known to have been Tampa's postmaster from 1893 to 1897 as well.

=== Rail ===
Post was involved in effort to bring rail service to Tampa and helped extend Henry Plant's Steamship Company contracts for service in Tampa.

== Personal ==
He opened an ice cream parlor and restaurant in the Masonic Lodge Building in downtown Tampa on March 31, 1877. He married Alberti Johnson in Tampa on January 3, 1879.

Post would die in Tampa on May 19, 1915.

== Additional sources ==
- Covington, Dr. James W. and Wavering, Debbie Lee, "The Mayors of Tampa: A Brief Administrative History," Tampa, FL: University of Tampa, 1987.
- Grismer, Karl H., Tampa: A History of the City and the Tampa Bay Region of Florida, St. Petersburg Printing Company, FL, 1950.
- Robinson, Ernest L., History of Hillsborough County, Florida: Narrative and Biographical, The Record Company, St. Augustine, FL, 1928.
- Tampa Council Minutes, City of Tampa Archives, Tampa

Political offices
| Preceded by George B. Sparkman | Mayor of Tampa; August 14, 1883 – August 13, 1886 | Succeeded by Herman Glogowski |
| Preceded by Herman Glogowski | Mayor of Tampa; March 4, 1891 – March 4, 1892 | Succeeded by Herman Glogowski |
