= Frank C. Bowyer =

Businessman and mayor of Tampa, Florida

Frank Clayton Bowyer (November 6, 1869 - October 18, 1925) was an American businessman who served as mayor of Tampa, Florida from June 1898 to June 1900. He was a Democrat.

He was born in Teays Valley, West Virginia. He was mayor during Tampa's time as an embarkation site for the Spanish American War. He oversaw a street paving program as mayor.

He appointed S. T. Woodward as police chief.

== See also ==
- List of mayors of Tampa, Florida
