= Harlem Academy School =

School for African Americans in Florida, US

Harlem Academy School, or School #2, was a school for African Americans in Tampa, Florida. Christina Meacham, Zacariah D. Greene and Blanche Armwood served as principals at the school. It was originally built with support from the Freedmens Bureau.

== History ==
Classes were initially held at the Hillsborough County Courthouse in 1868 and the school was originally known as School #2. A school building was constructed in 1889 at Harrison and Morgan Streets in what was then known as the "Scrub" area of Tampa. It burned in 1892 and was replaced in 1895. As of 1904 there were 472 students. A brick building was erected for the school in 1912. It closed in 1964.

The school participated in the Jamestown Exposition of 1907, a World's Fair, as part of the Negro Building exhibitions.

Christina Meacham, one of the school's principals, helped organize the Florida Negro Teacher's Association. In 1927, the school was renamed in honor of Meacham. A Tampa middle school is named for her.

Harlem Academy closed in 1965 and most of the records have been lost. The building was named a National Historic Landmark in 2005. In 2007, the Tampa Housing Authority, in cooperation with the Bank of America demolished the schoolhouse in what was then known as Central Park Village to make way for apartments and condominiums known as Town Square. As compensation for destroying the historic building, the district agreed to name a new middle school north of Scott Street Christina A Meacham Middle School.

In 2008, a historical marker was put up honoring the school as the first of its kind for African American students in Tampa. Doretha Edgecomb, longtime Hillsborough County commissioner attended the school, as did comedian Stepin Fetchit.
