= John Jackson (mayor) =

American politician

John James Jackson II (June 1809 – November 4, 1887) served as the 9th mayor of Tampa, Florida, U.S.

== Biography ==
John James Jackson II was born in Ballybay, County Monaghan, Ireland. He immigrated to the United States with his brother in 1841. The brothers traveled to New Orleans where John worked as an Assistant City Engineer for two years. In 1843, the federal government hired Jackson to survey a large land grant in present-day Palmetto, Florida. He accepted this appointment as federal surveyor and then moved to Hillsborough County with his brother Thomas to begin work. In addition to his salary, the federal government gave Jackson a large land grant in Hillsborough County.

Jackson's work also took him throughout Florida and it was on an assignment in St. Augustine that he met and married Ellen Maher in 1847 with whom he bore four children. Several weeks later, Hillsborough County hired Jackson to survey and map Tampa which had been designated the county seat in 1846. Jackson named the streets of Tampa after U.S. Presidents, military figures, and two local individuals, William Ashley and himself. After completing his assignment, Jackson returned to surveying but in 1849 he and his wife decided to move to Tampa where he established a general store on the corner of Washington and Tampa Streets. Jackson also became involved in Tampa politics and activities.

== Term as mayor ==
Jackson was elected mayor of Tampa on February 3, 1862, in which he served on 19 days, the shortest in Tampa history. In late April 1861, the Confederate military commander at Fort Brooke had placed Tampa under martial law which essentially nullified the authority of the town's government. On February 22, 1862, the Confederate military commander dismissed the mayor, city council, and other employees. This event was a formality since both the military authorities and Hillsborough County had assumed the city's activities the previous year. After his dismissal, Jackson returned to his general store and remained in Tampa for the remainder of the Civil War.

== Death ==
Jackson died on November 4, 1887.

== Sources ==
- Covington, Dr. James W. and Wavering, Debbie Lee, "The Mayors of Tampa: A Brief Administrative History", Tampa, Florida: University of Tampa, 1987.
- Grismer, Karl H., Tampa: A History of the City and the Tampa Bay Region of Florida, St. Petersburg Printing Company, Florida, 1950.
- Robinson, Ernest L., History of Hillsborough County, Florida: Narrative and Biographical, The Record Company, St. Augustine, Florida, 1928.
- Tampa Council Minutes, City of Tampa Archives, Tampa, Florida
- January 1, 1857 – October 2, 1891 Microfilm Roll # 1
