= James McKay Sr. =

American politician (1808–1876)

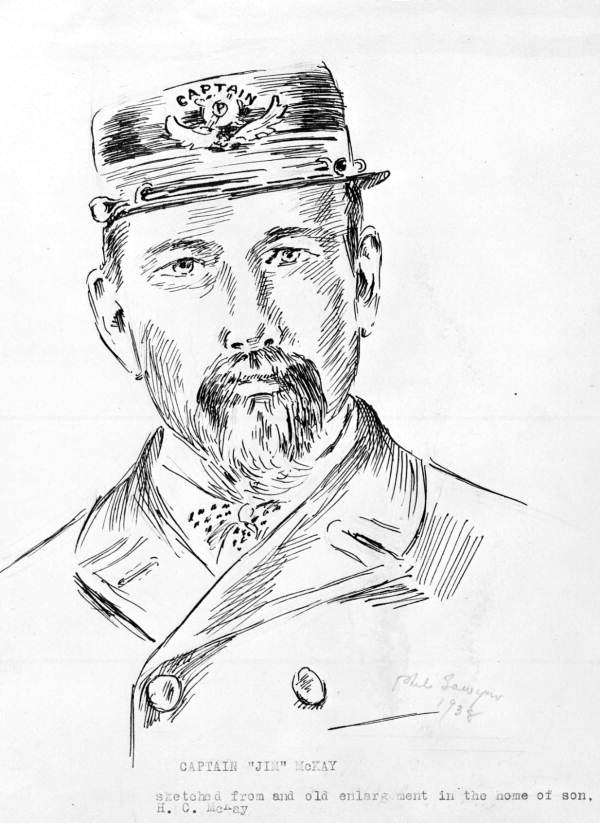

6th Mayor of Tampa
- In office February 12, 1859 – February 1, 1860
- Preceded by: Madison Post
- Succeeded by: John P. Crichton

Personal details
- Born: May 17, 1808 Thurso, Scotland
- Died: November 11, 1876 (aged 68) Tampa, Florida, US
- Party: Democratic
- Relations: James McKay Jr. (son), Donald Brenham McKay (grandson)
- Occupation: Cattleman, ship captain

James McKay Sr. (May 17, 1808 – November 11, 1876) was an American cattleman, ship captain, and the sixth mayor of Tampa, Florida. McKay is memorialized with a bronze bust on the Tampa Riverwalk, along with other historical figures prominent in the History of Tampa.

== Background ==
James McKay was born on May 17, 1808, in Thurso, Caithness, Scotland. He left to become a mariner and spent many years at sea, returning home for brief family visits.

He came to America in 1836 and located in St. Louis, where in 1837 he met Matilda Alexander Cail, a native of Scotland, born in Edinburgh, May 19, 1816, the daughter of widowed Sarah Alexander. Some historians claim that James met Matilda in Scotland but her mother refused the marriage due to her young age, so she left with Matilda to St. Louis, only to have James pursue her there. Two notable Tampa historians specifically state they never met before St. Louis.

Matilda's mother, a wealthy widow, disapproved at first of the match because of McKay's hazardous occupation and because Matilda was young of age. In St. Louis, Sarah Alexander married a Mr. Cail, an Englishman who had large investments in western lands. Mr. Cail disappeared while exploring the western wilderness, and left Madam Sarah Alexander Cail a widow once again, but much richer.

In St. Louis, Mckay continued his courtship of Matilda. Finally, the mother consented to their marriage. McKay was 27 years old and the bride 17.

In 1838, the couple, along with her mother, moved to Mobile, Alabama, where they had their first four children.

In Mobile, McKay met the Rev. Daniel Simmons, the Baptist minister who had established a mission in Hillsborough County, known as Simmon's Hammock, (see Seffner, Florida) in 1828 and had lived there until the Second Seminole War started, when he went to Alabama. Reverend Simmons was an ardent Florida booster and never ceased singing the praises of the Tampa Bay region. Captain McKay did not need much selling on the future prospects of the bay section. He knew that because of its geographical location, Tampa Bay was destined to become one of the leading ports of the nation. So in the early fall of 1846 he decided to go to Tampa.

Chartering a schooner, McKay left Mobile with his family in September, 1846. Reverend and Mrs. Simmons went with him, and so did Madame Cail and Mitchell McCarty and his wife, Elizabeth, daughter of the Simmonses.

As the McKay schooner sailed south along the Florida coast, a violent storm drove the vessel upon a reef near the mouth of the Chassahowitzka River. Captain McKay repeatedly swam through the rough surf to carry his wife, the children, and Madam Cail ashore. The slaves also survived the shipwreck, but the entire cargo was lost. They tarried at Chassahowitzka for a time where Donald S., their fourth son, was born August 8, 1846. The Simmons and McCarty families went on to Brooksville but the McKays soon afterward made their way to Tampa, arriving in November. Madame Cail came with them.

== Tampa ==
On October 13, 1846, the McKays entered the little village of Tampa which numbered less than two hundred inhabitants, exclusive of the soldiers in Fort Brooke. The village consisted of a few crude log huts thatched with palmetto fronds, with wooden shutters to keep out the cold and rain. The cottages were scattered over a sea of white sand. Cattle and pigs roamed at will.

Upon moving to Tampa, McKay opened a general store on Franklin Street (Tampa), invested in real estate, and operated a sawmill on the Hillsborough River. He also owned and operated two schooners for cargo transport cargo from Tampa to Cuba, Central America and South America. From 1858 McKay built a successful business purchasing and transporting large herds of Florida Cracker cattle.

During the 1850s, McKay was awarded the contract to be the sutler for Fort Myers, which was then only a small U.S. fortification built during the Seminole Wars.

He and his wife had five more children in Tampa (Donald, Marion, Almeria, Matilda and Charles).

=== Mayor ===
McKay was elected mayor on February 12, 1859, serving until February 1, 1860. His accomplishments include the establishment of standard procedures and forms for licenses, ordinances and legal notices; regulation of the Jackson Street ferry service, and a rental agreement for the Fort Brooke military reservation after purchase attempts failed. The rental deal lasted 18 months until April 1861 when Confederate troops occupied the fort and declared martial law.

McKay was a citizen of the United Kingdom throughout his life and is the only non-U.S. citizen to serve as Mayor of Tampa.

=== Captain McKay ===
In 1858, McKay made a contract with the Morgan Line allowing him to use USS Magnolia (1854) twice a month at a price of $1,500 each run in order to ship cattle to Cuba. This established the Magnolia as the first of many ships to be used in the same way, and the introduction of Spanish doubloons to Florida can be traced back to the trading trips made by Magnolia.

=== Civil War ===
In the months leading up to December 1860, McKay voiced anti-secession sentiments, believing that rebellion would be detrimental to commercial enterprise.

Sometime around mid-April 1861 McKay made a deal with Lieutenant Henry Benson, with whom he had met and become friends with while serving as the sutler in Fort Myers. The deal stipulated that he would provide beef at a bargain price to the Federal troops at Fort Jefferson and, in return, the Union Navy would not interfere with McKay's Cuban cattle trade. He returned to Tampa to find the city was very much pro-secession and offered to sell his ship, the Salvor to the Confederacy, who declined the offer. Despite this, by the time McKay returned with cattle to Key West, the Union officials had caught word of the deal between McKay and the Rebels.

McKay appealed and was eventually allowed to return to Tampa thanks to two other acquaintances from his time at Fort Myers, Colonel Harvey Brown and Colonel William H. French. He returned to Tampa only to be put on trial for treason against the Confederacy. Despite the best efforts of his prosecutor and political rival Senator James T. Magbee, McKay's trial was suspended and he immediately made plans to leave for Key West. Whether it was a genuine offer or simply an excuse to leave, McKay asked local Confederate officials for permission to run cattle to Havana.

On October 14, 1861, McKay and his 450-ton steamer, the Salvor, along with six cannons, 21,000 "stand of arms," 100 boxes of revolvers, and ammunition, were seized by the Union Navy.

In 1863, McKay was appointed Commissary Agent for the 5th District of Florida by Confederate Major Pleasant W. White. He was frustrated with the difficulties in running cattle for the Confederacy and hired additional men to protect his herds from Union troops, pro-Union Floridians, and Confederate deserters. In March 1864, McKay wrote a letter to the Secretary of War James Seddon proposing the formation of a unit specifically designated to protect the Florida cattle trade. By the end of spring 1864, this unit, which would become known as the 1st Florida Special Cavalry Battalion was being organized.

After the Civil War, McKay resumed his cattle and shipping business. He is buried in Tampa's Oaklawn Cemetery.

== Legacy ==
McKay's son, James McKay Jr., would fight for the Confederacy, first as a captain in the 4th Florida Infantry and eventually rising to the rank of Major in the 1st Florida Special Cavalry Battalion. McKay Jr. would later serve as the 34th Mayor of Tampa from June, 1902 – June, 1904.

McKay Sr.'s grandson, Donald Brenhan McKay, was also a Mayor of Tampa. He was a leading organizer of the White Municipal Party, a white supremacist organization, and the first mayor of Tampa elected under its influence. He served 3 terms from June 1910 to June 1920 and a 4th term from January 1928 to October 1931, making him the 38th and 42nd Mayor of Tampa.

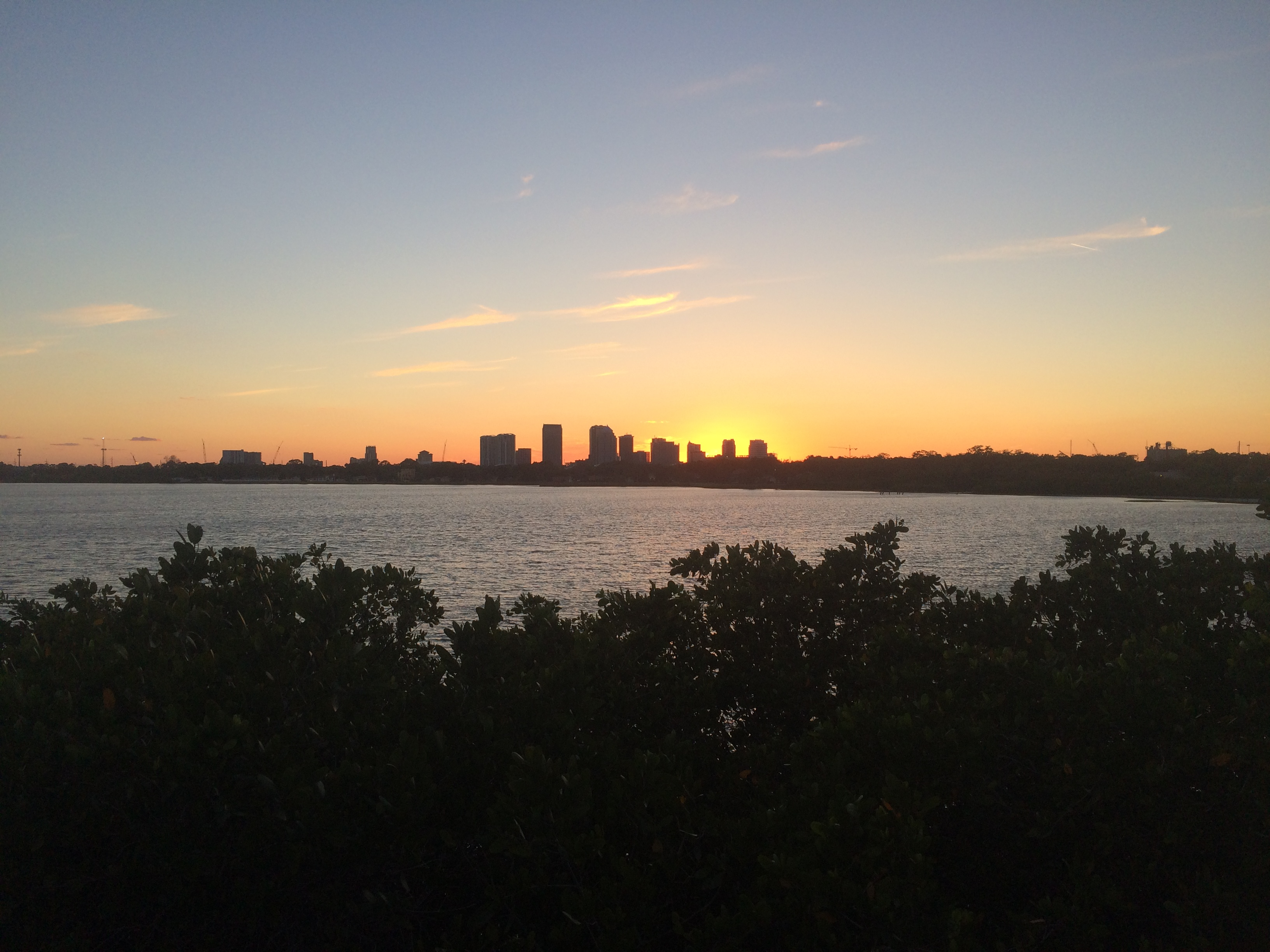
McKay Bay

McKay Bay, the portion of Tampa Bay adjoining the port, is named in James McKay Sr.'s honor.
