= List of mayors of Tampa, Florida =

Mayor of Tampa
- Seal of the City of Tampa

- Flag of the City of Tampa

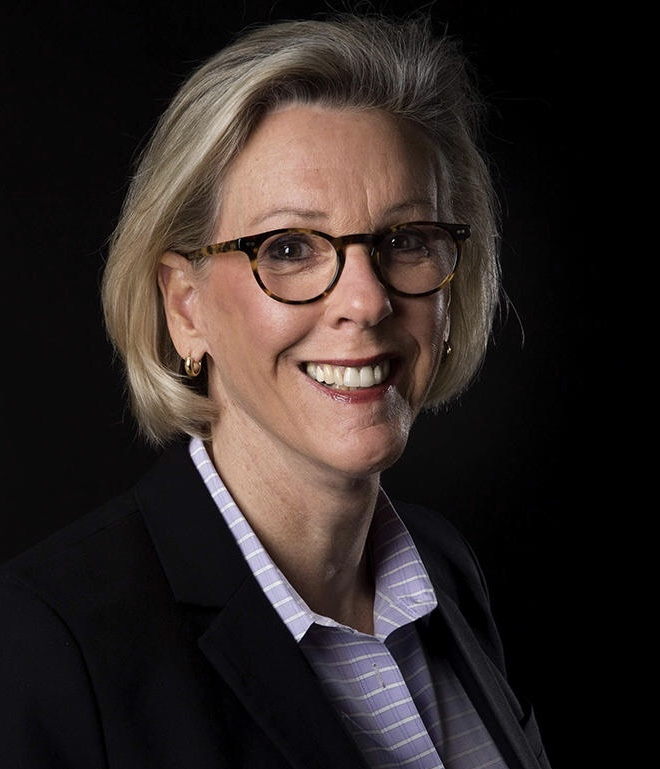
- Incumbent; Jane Castor since May 1, 2019
- Style: The Honorable
- Term length: 4 years limited to two consecutive terms
- Inaugural holder: Joseph B. Lancaster
- Formation: 1856
- Salary: $160,384
- Website: www.tampagov.net/mayor

The Mayor is the highest elected official in Tampa, Florida. Since its incorporation in 1856, the town has had 59 mayors. Tampa had no mayor from 1862 until 1866 when the city government was temporarily suspended during and immediately after the American Civil War.

== Election process ==
In 1910, the white supremacist White Municipal Party was established in Tampa. It excluded African Americans from being members, effectively excluding African American voters from having influence in the city's mayoral elections from 1910 until 1947.

Since 1953, Tampa's municipal elections (including those for mayor) have been non-partisan. All qualified candidates are entered into the general election without a primary election. Candidates are required to disclose a party affiliation. If no candidate wins a majority of the vote, a runoff election is held between the top two vote-getters to decide the outcome.

== Terms and term limits ==
From the establishment of Tampa's city charter of 1856 until 1896, Tampa's mayors served one year terms. The term was extended to two years in 1896 and to four years in 1924.

From 1856 until 1920, Tampa mayors could not serve consecutive terms but were permitted to run again after being out of office for one full term. This resulted in several mayors serving multiple non-consecutive terms, especially in the late 1800s. In 1920, term limits were abolished entirely.

Since 1983, Tampa mayors have been limited to two consecutive terms, but they may run again after spending at least a full four-year term out of the office.

== List ==
#	Mayor	Term start	Term end	Terms	Party
1	Joseph B. Lancaster †	February 14, 1856	November 25, 1856	1/2	American
2	Darwin A. Branch (1st term)	November 25, 1856	December 6, 1856	Acting	American
3	Alfonso DeLaunay	December 6, 1856	February 9, 1857	Partial	Democratic
4	Darwin A. Branch (2nd term)	February 9, 1857	February 10, 1858	1	American
5	Madison Post	February 10, 1858	February 12, 1859	1	American
6	James McKay Sr.	February 12, 1859	February 1, 1860	1	Democratic
7	John P. Crichton	February 1, 1860	February 2, 1861	1	Democratic
8	Hamlin V. Snell	February 2, 1861	February 3, 1862	1	Democratic (Southern)
9	John Jackson	February 3, 1862	February 22, 1862	Acting	Democratic (Southern)
10	Edward A. Clarke	October 25, 1866	January 1, 1867	1	Democratic
11	Josiah A. Ferris	January 1, 1867	March 1, 1869	1 1/2	Democratic
12	John T. Lesley	March 1, 1869	October 4, 1869	1/2	Democratic
/	John A. Henderson ^{1}	July 6, 1870	mid 1872	2	Democratic
13	James E. Lipscomb	August 11, 1873	August 13, 1876	3	Democratic
14	Harlan P. Lovering	August 14, 1876	August 14, 1877	1	Democratic
15	Thomas Jackson (1st term)	August 14, 1877	August 14, 1878	1	Democratic
16	John P. Wall	August 14, 1878	August 14, 1880	2	Democratic
17	Henry C. Ferris	August 14, 1880	February 19, 1881	1	Democratic
18	Matthew E. Haynsworth	February 19, 1881	March 22, 1881	Acting	Democratic
19	George B. Sparkman (1st term)	March 22, 1881	August 14, 1883	2	Democratic
20	Duff Post (1st term)	August 14, 1883	August 13, 1886	3	Democratic
21	Herman Glogowski (1st term)	August 13, 1886	July 15, 1887	1	Republican
22	George B. Sparkman (2nd term)	July 15, 1887	March 8, 1888	1	Democratic
23	Herman Glogowski (2nd term)	March 8, 1888	March 6, 1889	1	Republican
24	Thomas Jackson (2nd term)	March 6, 1889	March 5, 1890	1	Democratic
25	Herman Glogowski (3rd term)	March 5, 1890	March 4, 1891	1	Republican
26	Duff Post (2nd term)	March 4, 1891	March 4, 1892	1	Democratic
27	Herman Glogowski (4th term)	March 4, 1892	March 10, 1893	1	Republican
28	Frederick A. Salomonson (1st term)	March 10, 1893	March 9, 1894	1	Republican
29	Robert W. Easley	March 9, 1894	March 8, 1895	1	Democratic
30	Frederick A. Salomonson (2nd term)	March 8, 1895	June 5, 1896	1	Republican
31	Myron E. Gillett	June 5, 1896	June 5, 1898	1	Republican
32	Frank C. Bowyer	June 5, 1898	June 8, 1900	1	Democratic
33	Francis L. Wing (1st term)	June 8, 1900	June 4, 1902	1	Democratic
34	James McKay Jr.	June 5, 1902	June 5, 1904	1	Democratic
35	Frederick A. Salomonson (3rd term)	June 5, 1904	June 7, 1906	1	Republican
36	William H. Frecker	June 8, 1906	June 4, 1908	1	Republican
37	Francis L. Wing (2nd term)	June 4, 1908	June 6, 1910	1	Independent
38	Donald B. McKay (1st term)	June 6, 1910	June 10, 1920	3	White Municipal Party
39	Horace Cadwell Gordon	June 10, 1920	January 4, 1921	1/2	White Municipal Party
40	Charles H. Brown	January 4, 1921	January 8, 1924	1	White Municipal Party
41	Perry G. Wall	January 8, 1924	January 3, 1928	1	White Municipal Party
42	Donald B. McKay (2nd term)	January 3, 1928	October 27, 1931	1	White Municipal Party
43	Thomas N. Henderson	October 27, 1931	November 3, 1931	Partial	White Municipal Party
44	Robert E. Lee Chancey	November 3, 1931	November 3, 1943	3	White Municipal Party
45	Curtis Hixon †	November 3, 1943	May 21, 1956	3 1/2	White Municipal Party/Democratic
46	Junie L. Young Jr.	May 21, 1956	October 2, 1956	Acting	Democratic
47	Nick Nuccio (1st administration)	October 2, 1956	October 1, 1959	1	Democratic
48	Julian Lane	October 1, 1959	October 1, 1963	1	Democratic
49	Nick Nuccio (2nd administration)	October 1, 1963	October 3, 1967	1	Democratic
50	Dick A. Greco (1st administration)	October 3, 1967	April 1, 1974	2	Democratic
51	Richard L. Cheney †	April 1, 1974	June 19, 1974	Acting	Democratic
52	Lloyd Copeland	June 19, 1974	October 3, 1974	Acting	Republican
53	William F. Poe	October 3, 1974	October 1, 1979	1	Republican
54	Bob Martinez	October 3, 1979	July 16, 1986	1 1/2	Democratic
54	Bob Martinez	October 3, 1979	July 16, 1986	1 1/2	Republican
55	Sandra Freedman	July 16, 1986	April 1, 1995	2	Democratic
56	Dick A. Greco (2nd administration)	April 1, 1995	April 1, 2003	2	Democratic
57	Pam Iorio	April 1, 2003	March 31, 2011	2	Democratic
58	Bob Buckhorn	April 1, 2011	May 1, 2019	2	Democratic
59	Jane Castor	May 1, 2019	Incumbent	1	Democratic

Notes

^{†} Deceased in office.
^{1} Following the lapse of the city charter in October 1869, Hillsborough County took over responsibility for providing principal services. However, Tampa needed some form of municipal government to monitor the services being provided by the county and the state. As a result, a municipal election was held on July 6, 1870, in which Henderson was elected mayor.

== See also ==
- Timeline of Tampa, Florida
