= Flag of Tampa, Florida =

City of Tampa
- Adopted: July 1, 1930
- Designed by: F. Grant Whitney

The city flag of Tampa, Florida was adopted by the city on July 1, 1930. The many pieces of the unique flag portray the various elements that made the city itself a success. The flag is one of the few non-quadrilateral flags in use.

== Creation of flag ==
Although Tampa was named in 1849, it took almost 100 years for a flag to be created. Mayor D.B. McKay introduced the design to the city's multi-national heritage. In turn he presented the banner to the board of Representatives and recommended that it be adopted as the official flag. On July 1, 1930, the board adopted the flag from its designer F. Grant Whitney, an accountant.

== History and description ==
The colors are inspired by the national flags of the immigrants who settled the area: France, Great Britain, and the United States (red, white and blue); Italy (green, white, and red); and Spain (red and yellow). The gold and red striped section is supposed to represent the flag of Spain which had a large part in both Tampa and Florida’s history with the Spanish exploration. In the flag, the state recognized the British contribution to the city with the red, white chevron like stripes that are supposed to represent two of the three aspects that make up the British Union “portions of the Crosses of St. Andrew and St. George”.

The red, white, blue, and stars depict the United States of America, which bought the state in 1821. The red, white, and blue on the left side of the flag is a representation of the French flag. The tip of the flag, which is red and green and has a single white star, portrays the Italian flag. Both countries “had an influence on the culture and heritage” of the city of Tampa and creator Whitney wanted to incorporate the many immigrants who helped the city grow and thrive. “Fort Brooke was established and, in 1834, the Territorial Legislature created Hillsborough County, which is symbolized by a stylized "H"”. The letter “H” is disguised, composed of the representations of the flags of France and Spain with the blue line that forms the large “T” which is turned sideways, standing for the city's name. “The City Seal of Tampa is featured over the white, gold and red stripes. The seal notes that the City of Tampa was organized in 1887. Tampa was incorporated as a village in 1849, as a town in 1855, and as a city in 1887.”

The ship bearing the three masts with two sails apiece is a reference to businessman Henry B. Plant. Incorporating Plant's ship, the SS Mascotte, was important, as “The significant contributions to the development of Florida and Tampa Bay are why Success magazine dubbed Henry Plant “the King of Florida” in 1898.”

The unique shape of the flag is a chamfered variation of a double-pointed swallowtail.

== Criticism ==
Since at least 2017, the city of Tampa flag has been criticized and ridiculed, even to the point of making the ranks of "the ugliest city flags on Earth," for “trying too hard”. Another website thinks “This flag would make a great beach towel for tourists or a colorful cape for a Floridian superhero.” Most Tampa natives don't even know they have a flag, and those who do are in favor of having it changed. “Out of the 224 people who had taken a survey on tampaflag.com of last week, 92 percent said they supported changing it.” The dislike of the flag even has an online petition on change.org calling for a newly designed flag for the growing city of Tampa. Although most are in favor of changing the flag or completely redesigning it there is worry that people who have lived in the Tampa Bay area for generations could be upset to let it go. With all of the history and meaning the flag encapsulates, any new flag will need to be sure to capture both the history and essence of Tampa.

== See also ==
- Flag of Florida
