= White Municipal Party =

White supremacist party in Tampa, Florida, US

The White Municipal Party was a white supremacist political organization established in 1910 in Tampa, Florida to eliminate African American influence in municipal elections. The group limited local elections to white candidates for many years by excluding African Americans from party membership and thereby blocking them from participating in primary elections where the eventual election winners were actually determined. The party produced an unbroken series of mayors in Tampa from 1910 until 1947.

Florida politics had been dominated by one party, the Democratic Party, since the 1880s. And in 1902 the Florida Democratic Party limited membership to whites only.

The formation of the White Municipal Party followed an attempt by Zacariah D. Greene, a lawyer and principal at Harlem Academy to run for a municipal judgeship. City officials prevented him from running and Judge Wall dismissed his appeal. The judge became a member of the executive committee of the party.

Pam Iorio, who served as mayor of Tampa, wrote about the group in the Florida Historical Quarterly published by the Florida Historical Society.

== See also ==
- White Citizens Parties
- Jim Crow laws
- White Citizens Councils
- List of mayors of Tampa, Florida
- Nixon v. Herndon, a 1923 U.S. Supreme Court case
- Grovey v. Townsend, 1935 U.S. Supreme Court case
- Smith v. Allwright, 1944 U.S. Supreme Court Case
