= Schweitzer cabinet =

State government of Rhineland-Palatinate since 2024

Schweitzer Cabinet
- 26th Cabinet of Rhineland-Palatinate
- 10 July 2024 – 18 May 2026
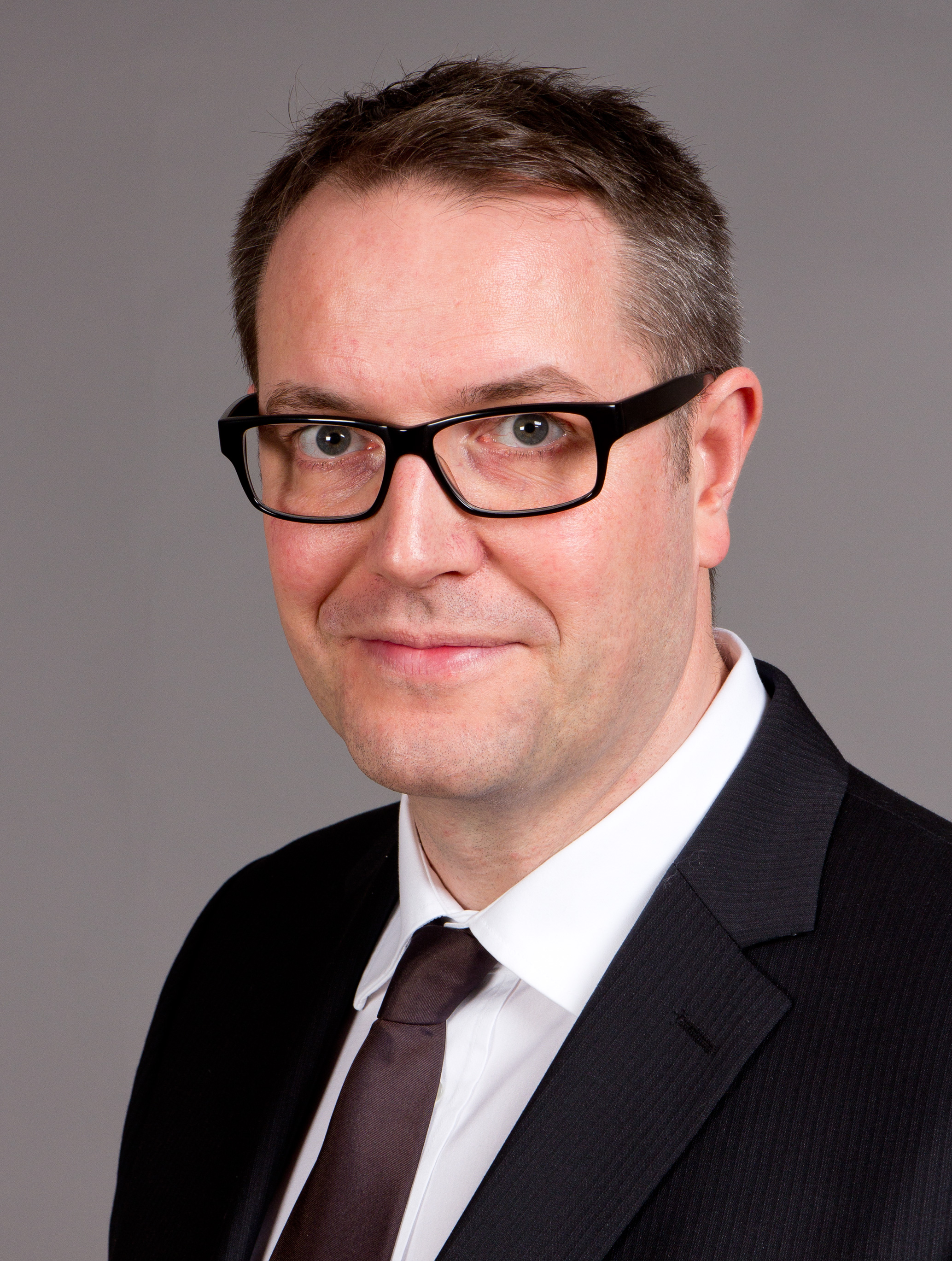
- Alexander Schweitzer in 2014
- Date formed: 10 July 2024
- Date dissolved: 18 May 2026

People and organisations
- Minister-President: Alexander Schweitzer
- Deputy Minister-President: Katharina Binz
- No. of ministers: 9
- Member parties: Social Democratic Party; Alliance 90/The Greens; Free Democratic Party
- Status in legislature: Majority (Coalition)
- Opposition parties: Christian Democratic Union; Alternative for Germany; Free Voters; Bündnis Sahra Wagenknecht

History
- Election: 2021 Rhineland-Palatinate state election
- Legislature term: 18th Landtag of Rhineland-Palatinate
- Predecessor: Dreyer III
- Successor: Schnieder

The Schweitzer cabinet was the government of the German state of Rhineland-Palatinate from July 2024 to May 2026, succeeding the third Dreyer cabinet.

The cabinet was again formed as a traffic light coalition consisting of the SPD, the Greens and the FDP.

== Vote in the Landtag ==
On 10 July 2024, the Landtag of Rhineland-Palatinate elected Alexander Schweitzer as Minister-President, receiving three more votes than the coalition factions supporting him actually have; thus, he was also elected by opposition MPs in the secret ballot. Schweitzer's cabinet was then appointed and confirmed by the Landtag.

Mainz, 10 July 2024 – total number of votes = 101 votes – absolute majority = 51 votes
Ballot	Candidate	Votes	number of votes	share (votes cast)	supporters
1st round of voting	Alexander Schweitzer (SPD)	yes votes	57	56.4%	SPD, Greens, FDP
1st round of voting	Alexander Schweitzer (SPD)	no votes	39	38.6%	SPD, Greens, FDP
1st round of voting	Alexander Schweitzer (SPD)	abstentions	4	4.0%	SPD, Greens, FDP
1st round of voting	Alexander Schweitzer (SPD)	Invalid votes	0	0.0%	SPD, Greens, FDP
1st round of voting	Alexander Schweitzer (SPD)	non-participation	1	1.0%	SPD, Greens, FDP
Alexander Schweitzer was elected Minister President of Rhineland-Palatinate.

== State government ==
Schweitzer Cabinet
Office/department	Photo	Name	Party	Picture	State secretaries	Party
Ministerpräsident Head of the State Chancellery of Rhineland-Palatinate		Alexander Schweitzer	SPD		Fedor Ruhose - Head of the State Chancellery	SPD
Ministerpräsident Head of the State Chancellery of Rhineland-Palatinate		Alexander Schweitzer	SPD		Heike Raab - Representative of the State of Rhineland-Palatinate in Berlin, and for Europe, Media, Digital and Sustainability	SPD
Minister for Family, Women, Culture and Integration		Katharina Binz Also Deputy Minister-President	GRÜNE		Jürgen Hardeck	non-partisan
Minister for Family, Women, Culture and Integration		Katharina Binz Also Deputy Minister-President	GRÜNE		Janosch Littig	GRÜNE
Minister for Economic Affairs, Transport, Agriculture and Viticulture		Daniela Schmitt	FDP		Andy Becht	FDP
Minister for Economic Affairs, Transport, Agriculture and Viticulture		Daniela Schmitt	FDP		Petra Dick-Walther	FDP
Minister of Finance		Doris Ahnen	SPD		Stephan Weinberg	SPD
Minister of Justice		Herbert Mertin (died 2025) Philipp Fernis	FDP		Matthias Frey	FDP
Minister of the Interior and Sport		Michael Ebling	SPD		Daniel Stich	SPD
Minister of the Interior and Sport		Michael Ebling	SPD		Simone Schneider	SPD
Minister of Education		Stefanie Hubig	SPD		Bettina Brück	SPD
Minister of Labour, Social Affairs, Transformation and Digitization		Dörte Schall	SPD		Denis Alt	SPD
Minister of Science and Health		Clemens Hoch	SPD		Nicole Steingaß	SPD
Minister for Climate Protection, Environment, Energy and Mobility		Katrin Eder	GRÜNE		Erwin Manz	GRÜNE
Minister for Climate Protection, Environment, Energy and Mobility		Katrin Eder	GRÜNE		Michael Hauer	GRÜNE
