= Third Dreyer cabinet =

State government of Rhineland-Palatinate

Third Cabinet of Malu Dreyer Dreyer III
- 25th Cabinet of Rhineland-Palatinate
- 18 May 2021 – 10 July 2024
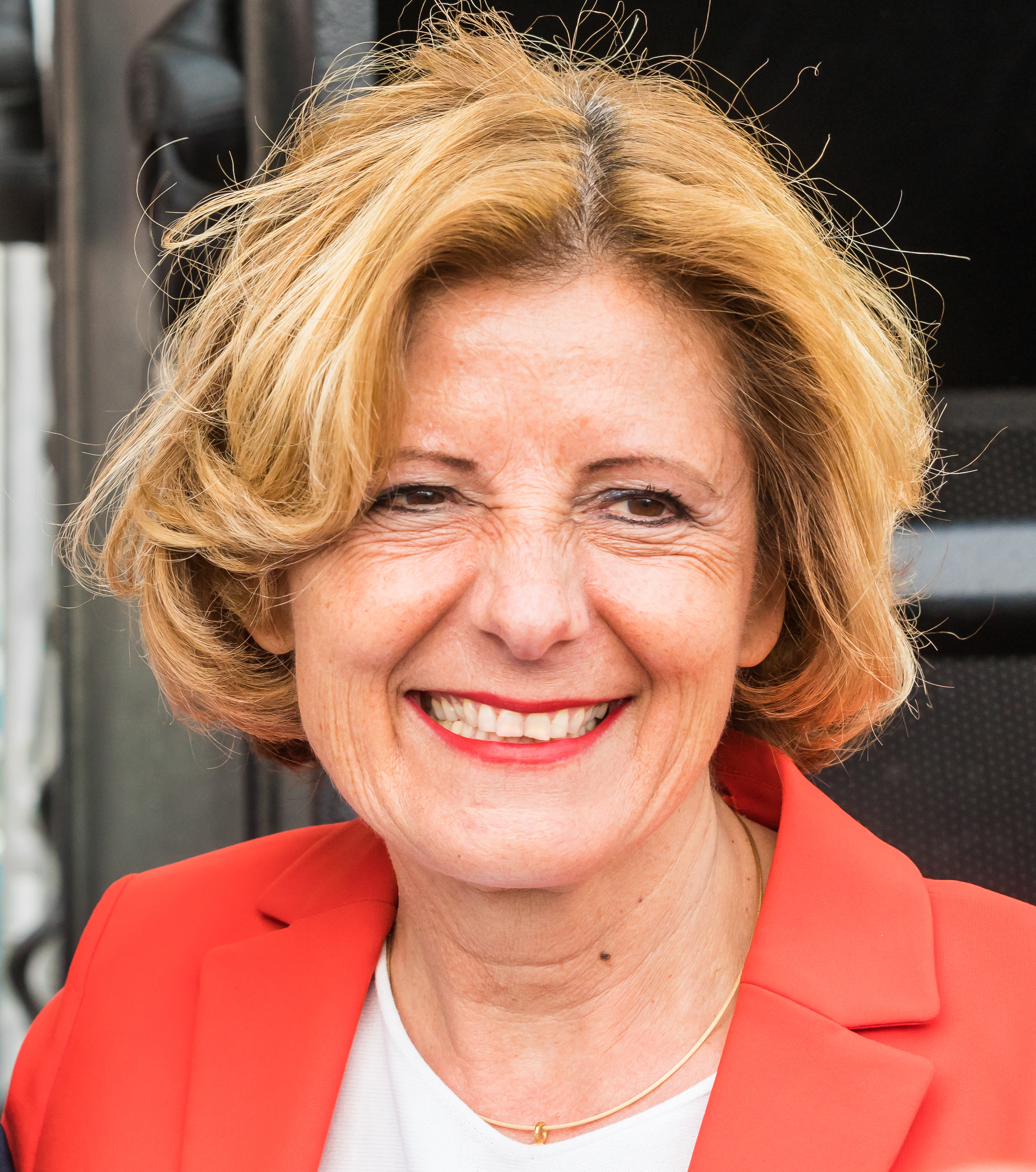
- Malu Dreyer in May 2022
- Date formed: 18 May 2021
- Date dissolved: 10 July 2024

People and organisations
- Minister-President: Malu Dreyer
- Deputy Minister-President: Anne Spiegel (until Dec 2021); Katharina Binz (from Dec 2021) Daniela Schmitt
- No. of ministers: 9
- Member parties: Social Democratic Party; Alliance 90/The Greens; Free Democratic Party
- Status in legislature: Majority (Coalition)
- Opposition parties: Christian Democratic Union; Alternative for Germany; Free Voters

History
- Election: 2021 Rhineland-Palatinate state election
- Legislature term: 18th Landtag of Rhineland-Palatinate
- Predecessor: Dreyer II
- Successor: Schweitzer

The Third Dreyer cabinet was the state government of Rhineland-Palatinate from 18 May 2021 until 10 July 2024. It was sworn in on 18 May after Malu Dreyer was elected as Minister-President of Rhineland-Palatinate by the members of the Landtag of Rhineland-Palatinate.

It was formed after the 2021 Rhineland-Palatinate state election by the SPD, the Greens, and the FDP. The cabinet comprised ten members including the Minister-President: six from the SPD, and two each from the Greens and FDP.

== Formation ==
The previous cabinet was a traffic light coalition government of the SPD, FDP, and Greens led by Minister-President Malu Dreyer of the SPD.

The election took place on 14 March 2021, and resulted in no net change for the SPD, while the Greens improved from fifth to third place and the FDP saw a slight decline. The opposition CDU and AfD also suffered losses while the Free Voters entered the Landtag for the first time.

Minister-President Dreyer expressed her desire to renew the coalition between the SPD, Greens, and FDP. State FDP chairman Volker Wissing made similar comments. The three parties began exploratory talks on 18 March.

On 30 April, they announced they had agreed to renew the coalition. In early May, all three parties held congresses to approve the coalition agreement. It passed the SPD congress with 96.2% of delegates voting in favour, while 83.3% of the Greens approved, as did 82.9% of the FDP.

The Landtag re-elected Dreyer as Minister-President for a third term on 18 May, receiving 55 votes out of the 51 required for a majority.

Dreyer resigned on 10 July 2024 and her successor, Alexander Schweitzer, formed his own cabinet.

== Composition ==
Portfolio	Minister	Party	Took office	Left office	State secretaries
Minister-President; State Chancellery	Malu Dreyer born 6 February 1961 (age 65)	SPD	18 May 2021	10 July 2024	Fabian Kirsch (Head of the State Chancellery); Heike Raab - Representative of the State of Rhineland-Palatinate in Berlin, and for Europe, Media, Digital and Sustainability
Deputy Minister-President	Katharina Binz born 30 October 1983 (age 42)	GRÜNE	15 December 2021	10 July 2024	David Profit; Jürgen Hardeck
Minister for Family, Women, Culture and Integration	Katharina Binz born 30 October 1983 (age 42)	GRÜNE	18 May 2021	10 July 2024	David Profit; Jürgen Hardeck
Deputy Minister-President Minister for Economic Affairs, Transport, Agriculture and Viticulture	Daniela Schmitt born 5 August 1972 (age 53)	FDP	18 May 2021	10 July 2024	Andy Becht; Petra Dick-Walther
Minister of Finance	Doris Ahnen born 29 August 1964 (age 61)	SPD	18 May 2021	10 July 2024	Stephan Weinberg
Minister of Justice	Herbert Mertin born 29 April 1958 (age 68)	FDP	18 May 2021	10 July 2024	Matthias Frey
Minister of the Interior and Sport	Roger Lewentz born 19 March 1963 (age 63)	SPD	18 May 2021	10 July 2024	Nicole Steingaß; Randolf Stich
Minister of Education	Stefanie Hubig born 15 December 1968 (age 57)	SPD	18 May 2021	10 July 2024	Bettina Brück
Minister of Labour, Social Affairs, Transformation and Digitization	Alexander Schweitzer born 17 September 1973 (age 52)	SPD	18 May 2021	10 July 2024	Fedor Ruhose
Minister of Science and Health	Clemens Hoch born 5 January 1978 (age 48)	SPD	18 May 2021	10 July 2024	Denis Alt
Minister for Climate Protection, Environment, Energy and Mobility	Katrin Eder born 24 October 1976 (age 49)	GRÜNE	15 December 2021	10 July 2024	Michael Hauer
Deputy Minister-President Minister for Climate Protection, Environment, Energy and Mobility	Anne Spiegel born 15 December 1980 (age 45)	GRÜNE	18 May 2021	7 December 2021	Erwin Manz
