= Anne Spiegel =

German politician, Federal Minister for Family Affairs (born 1980)

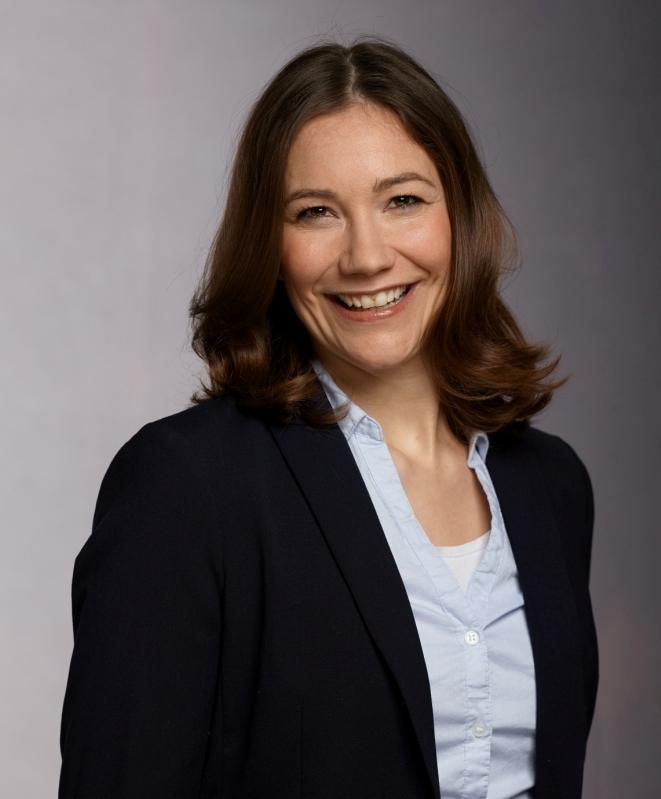
- Spiegel in 2016

Minister of Family Affairs, Senior Citizens, Women and Youth
- In office 8 December 2021 – 25 April 2022
- Chancellor: Olaf Scholz
- Preceded by: Christine Lambrecht
- Succeeded by: Lisa Paus

Deputy Minister President of Rhineland-Palatinate
- In office 18 May 2021 – 8 December 2021
- Minister President: Malu Dreyer
- Preceded by: Volker Wissing
- Succeeded by: Katharina Binz

Minister for Climate Protection, Environment, Mobility, Energy and Forests in Rhineland-Palatinate
- In office 18 May 2021 – 8 December 2021
- Minister President: Malu Dreyer
- Preceded by: Ulrike Höfken
- Succeeded by: Katrin Eder

Minister for Family, Women, Youth, Integration and Consumer Protection in Rhineland-Palatinate
- In office 18 May 2016 – 18 May 2021
- Minister President: Malu Dreyer
- Preceded by: Irene Alt
- Succeeded by: Katharina Binz

Member of the Landtag of Rhineland-Palatinate
- In office 27 March 2011 – 18 May 2016
- Constituency: Party list

Personal details
- Born: 15 December 1980 (age 45) Leimen, Baden-Württemberg, West Germany (now Germany)
- Party: Alliance 90/The Greens
- Children: 4

Anne Spiegel (born 15 December 1980) is a German politician of Alliance 90/The Greens. She served as Federal Minister for Family Affairs, Senior Citizens, Women and Youth in the cabinet of Chancellor Olaf Scholz since 8 December 2021; she announced her resignation on 11 April and was dismissed by the President on 25 April 2022

In 2021, Spiegel served as Deputy Minister-President and Minister for Climate Protection, Environment, Mobility, Energy and Forests in the state government of Rhineland-Palatinate. Previously, she was Minister for Family, Women, Youth, Integration and Consumer Protection in the second cabinet of Minister-President Malu Dreyer from 2016 to 2021. She was a prominent youth leader in Germany during the 2000s.

Spiegel was first elected to the Landtag of Rhineland-Palatinate in the 2011 state election, and re-elected in 2016. She was the lead candidate for the Greens in the 2021 Rhineland-Palatinate state election.

== Early life and career ==
Spiegel has Italian ancestry; among others, her maternal grandmother is from Sicily. Spiegel grew up in Speyer and Ludwigshafen, and attended the Albert Schweitzer elementary school, passing her Abitur in 2000 at the Heinrich-Böll-Gymnasium. She then studied politics, philosophy and psychology in Darmstadt, Mainz, Mannheim, and Salamanca until 2007. In spring 2007, she graduated as Master of Arts from the University of Mainz with a major in political science and minors in philosophy and psychology.

Spiegel then worked as a language teacher at Berlitz in Mainz, Mannheim, and Heidelberg from 2008 to 2010.

Spiegel lives in Speyer with her husband, who is Scottish, and four children.

== Political career ==
=== Early beginnings ===
Spiegel was a member of the board of the Green Youth of Rhineland-Palatinate from 1999 to 2002, including two years as board spokeswoman. She then served on the federal board of the Green Youth until 2004.

In 2005, Spiegel became the first German youth delegate to the United Nations. In autumn 2005 she represented young people in Germany at the United Nations General Assembly.

=== Career in state politics ===
In the 2006 Rhineland-Palatinate state election, Spiegel was the Greens candidate in the constituency of Ludwigshafen am Rhein II, and No. 7 on the party list. The party fell short of the 5% electoral threshold and failed to win any seats.

In the 2011 state election, Spiegel was the Greens candidate in the constituency of Speyer. She won 17.1% of votes, placing third behind the CDU and SPD candidates. She was third on the party list and was comfortably elected as one of the 18 Greens deputies, becoming deputy leader of the party's parliamentary group in the new Landtag. She served as spokesperson for women, integration, migration, and refugee policy. From 2014 to 2016, Spiegel also served on the Speyer city council.

In the 2016 state election, Spiegel was again the Greens' candidate in Speyer, this time winning 10.4% of votes. She was again elected third on the party list. After the Greens entered a coalition government with the Social Democratic Party and Free Democratic Party, Spiegel became Minister for Family, Women, Youth, Integration and Consumer Protection in the second Dreyer cabinet. She resigned from the Landtag to join the cabinet and was succeeded by Pia Schellhammer.

As one of the state's representatives at the Bundesrat, Spiegel is a member of the Committee on Agricultural Policy and Consumer Protection, the Committee on the Environment, Nature Conservation and Nuclear Safety, the Committee on Economic Affairs, and the Committee on Transport. She is also a member of the German–French Friendship Group set up by the German Bundesrat and the French Senate.

As State Minister for Families, Spiegel continued the work of her predecessor Irene Alt in advocating for marriage equality, campaigning for a vote in the Bundestag on the issue. In November 2016, she wrote a protest letter from the Bundesrat to Norbert Lammert, then President of the Bundestag. The initiative undertaken by Spiegel led to the introduction and passage of the Act introducing the right of marriage to persons of the same sex in June 2017.

Spiegel became the first minister in Rhineland-Palatinate to take maternity leave, which she did in April 2018 to give birth to her fourth child. Spiegel brought the baby to a meeting of the Federal Council in October 2018.

In November 2018, Spiegel represented the German federal government at the Women MPs Conference on the subject of "100 years of women's suffrage" in London. There she also met then-Prime Minister of the United Kingdom Theresa May. At the meeting, Spiegel urged her to prevent Brexit.

In the 2021 state elections, Spiegel was nominated as lead candidate for the Greens. The party won 9.3% of votes in the election, becoming the third-largest in the Landtag. The coalition government between the SPD, Greens, and FDP was subsequently renewed, and Spiegel became Deputy Minister-President and Minister for Climate Protection, Environment, Mobility, Energy and Forests.

=== Career in federal politics ===
In the negotiations to form a so-called traffic light coalition of the Social Democratic Party (SPD), the Green Party and the Free Democratic Party (FDP) following the 2021 federal elections, Spiegel was part of her party's delegation in the working group on climate protection and energy policy, co-chaired by Matthias Miersch, Oliver Krischer and Lukas Köhler.

On 25 November 2021, she was nominated by the federal board of the Greens as Federal Minister for Family Affairs, Senior Citizens, Women and Youth in the Scholz cabinet. She took office on 8 December.

Spiegel was nominated by her party as delegate to the Federal Convention for the purpose of electing the President of Germany in 2022.

During the flood in Rhineland-Palatinate in 2021, Spiegel was state environment minister. Shortly after the disaster, she was on a four week vacation in France. Spiegel had (falsely) stated that she had attended several cabinet meetings in Rhineland-Palatinate during her vacation. Up from March 2022, Spiegel was heavily criticized because internal documents revealed that she was more concerned with making her ministry look good than with assuming responsibility for the disaster.

Spiegel resigned from her post on 11 April 2022. She stated: "Due to political pressure, I decided today to make the office of Federal Minister for Family Affairs available. I am doing this to avert damage to the office, which is facing major political challenges." She made no reference to her alleged mistakes in the statement.

In October 2025, Anne Spiegel was nominated by Region Hannover president Steffen Krach (SPD) to head the Department for Social Affairs, Inclusion, Family and Youth (Dezernat II). If approved by the regional assembly, she is expected to assume office in May 2026. The nomination marks Spiegel’s first return to public office since her 2022 resignation. Local media described the move as a cautious political comeback, while some commentators questioned the choice.

== Other activities ==
- Franco-German Youth Office (FGYO), Ex-officio co-chair of the Board of Governors (2021–2022)
- German Foundation for Active Citizenship and Volunteering (DSEE), Ex-Officio Member of the Board of Trustees (2021–2022)
- Total E-Quality initiative, Member of the Board of Trustees (2021–2022)

== Political positions ==
Within the Green Party, Spiegel is considered to be part of its left wing.

== Criticism ==
After a 15-year-old girl was stabbed to death by her Afghan-born ex-boyfriend in Kandel in 2017, Spiegel – in her capacity as state minister in charge of integration – faced such massive hostility and threats that she was given personal protection.

In March 2022, text messages that Spiegel exchanged with her press spokesman while she was Rhineland-Palatinate's environment minister and that were available to the 18/1 investigative committee of the state parliament on the flood disaster in Rhineland-Palatinate became public. According to reports in the FAZ and other media, these text messages suggest that the state government did not react to the flood in time and that Spiegel, the environment minister at the time, was primarily concerned about her image.
