= Katrin Eder =

German politician (born 1976)

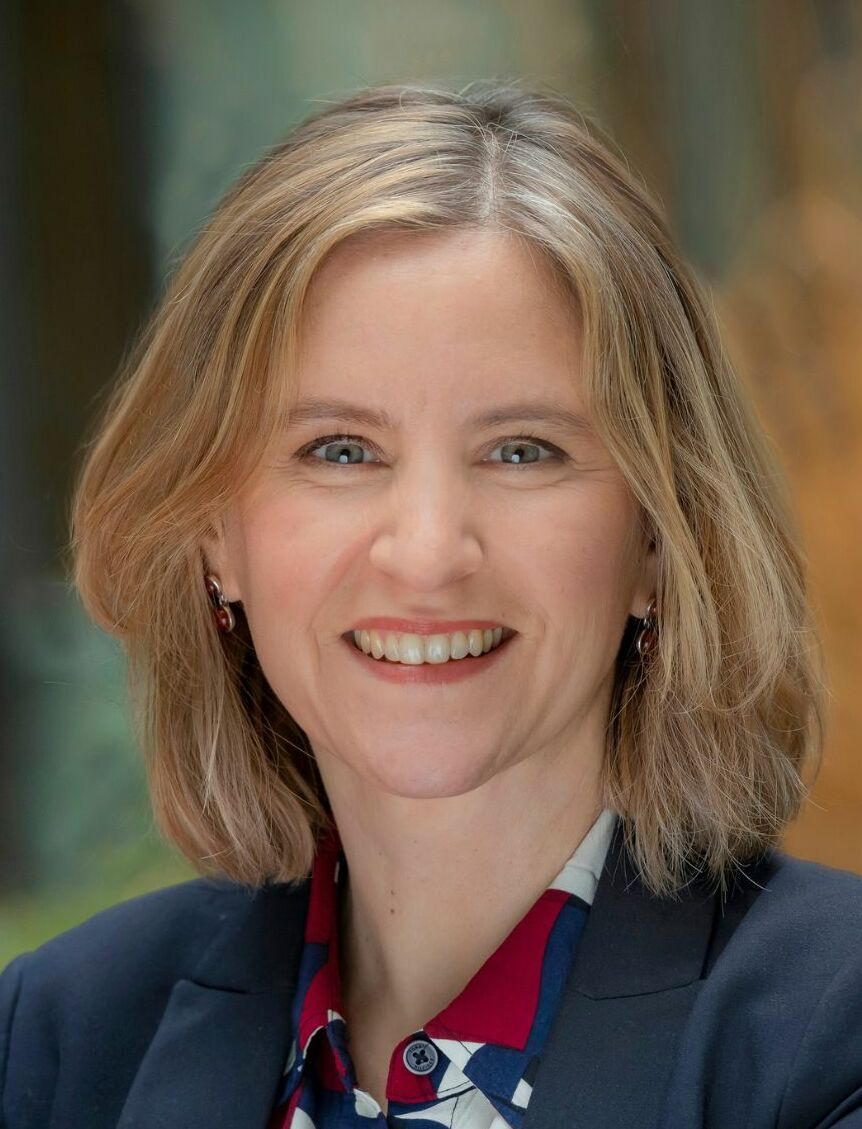
- Katrin Eder in 2021

State Minister for Climate Protection, Environment, Energy and Mobility of Rhineland-Palatinate
- In office 2021–2026
- Minister- President: Malu Dreyer, Alexander Schweitzer
- Preceded by: Anne Spiegel

Personal details
- Born: 24 October 1976 (age 49) Mainz, West Germany (now Germany)
- Party: Alliance 90/The Greens
- Education: University of Mainz

Katrin Eder (born 24 October 1976) is a German politician of Alliance 90/The Greens who has been serving as State Minister for Climate Protection, Environment, Energy and Mobility in the cabinets of successive Ministers-President of Rhineland-Palatinate Malu Dreyer and Alexander Schweitzer from 2021 to 2026.

== Early life and education ==
Eder was born in 1976 in the West German city of Mainz and studied political science at the University of Mainz.

== Political career ==
In November 2021, Eder was appointed State Minister for Climate Protection, Environment, Energy and Mobility. In this capacity, she was also one of the state's representatives on the Bundesrat, where she served on the Committee on Economic Affairs; the Committee on Agriculture and Consumer Protection; the Committee on Transport; and the Committee on the Environment, Nature Conservation and Nuclear Safety.

In October 2022, Eder publicly announced her decision not to become her party's candidate to succeed Michael Ebling as Mayor of Mainz.

== Other activities ==
- Federal Network Agency for Electricity, Gas, Telecommunications, Posts and Railway (BNetzA), Member of the Rail Infrastructure Advisory Council (since 2021)
