= Stefanie Hubig =

German judge and politician

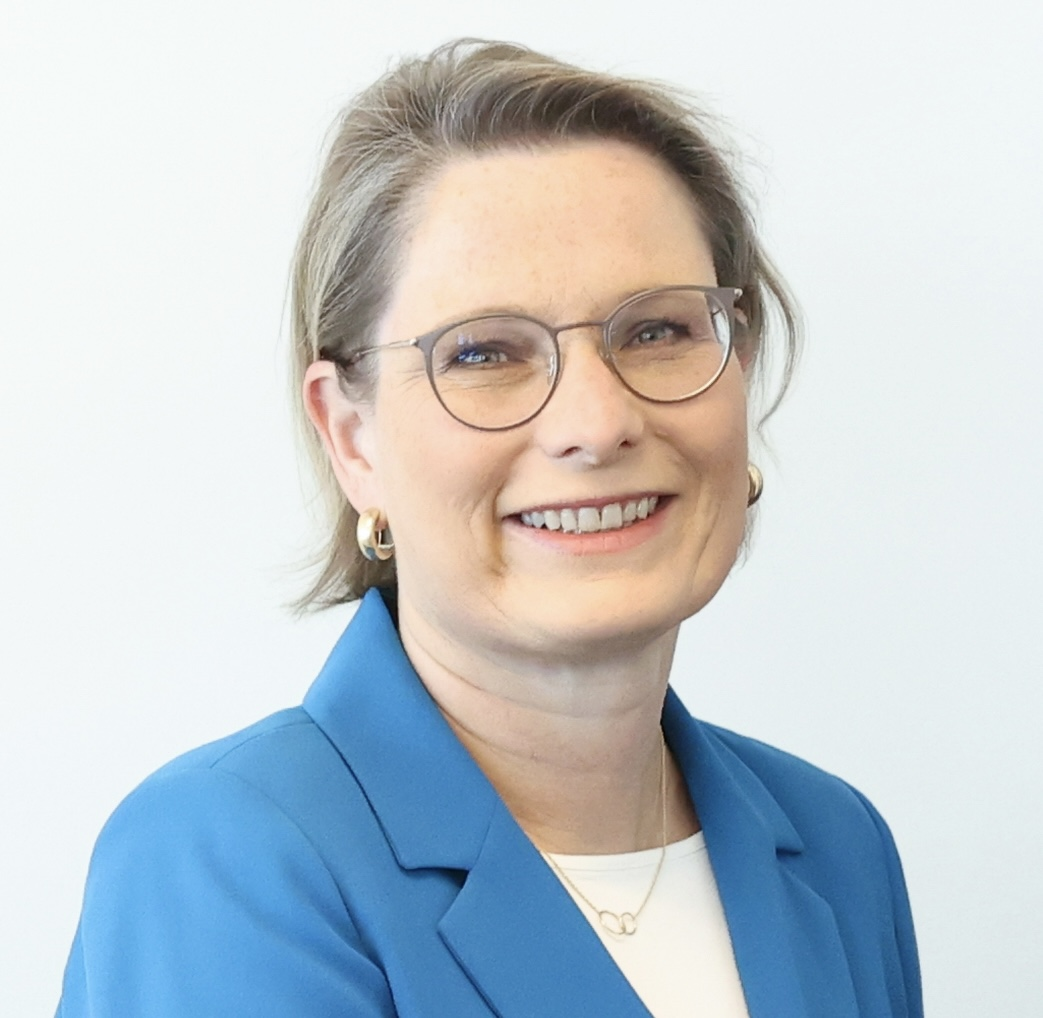
- Official portrait, 2025

Minister of Justice and Consumer Protection
- Incumbent
- Assumed office 6 May 2025
- Chancellor: Friedrich Merz
- Preceded by: Volker Wissing (Minister of Justice)

Minister for Education of Rhineland-Palatinate
- In office 18 May 2016 – 6 May 2025
- Minister President: Malu Dreyer; Alexander Schweitzer
- Preceded by: Vera Reiß
- Succeeded by: Sven Teuber

State Secretary in the Ministry of Justice and Consumer Protection
- In office 8 January 2014 – 18 May 2016
- Chancellor: Angela Merkel
- Preceded by: Birgit Grundmann
- Succeeded by: Christiane Wirtz

Personal details
- Born: 15 December 1968 (age 57) Frankfurt am Main, West Germany
- Party: Social Democratic Party (SPD)
- Education: University of Regensburg
- Occupation: Attorney • Jurist • Politician

Stefanie Hubig (German: [ˈʃtɛfani ˈhuːbɪç]; born 15 December 1968) is a German politician of the Social Democratic Party (SPD) who has been serving as Federal Minister of Justice in the government of Chancellor Friedrich Merz since 2025. From 2016 to 2025, she served as State Minister for Education in the government of Minister-President of Rhineland-Palatinate Malu Dreyer.

== Early life and education ==
Hubig was born 1968 in the West German city of Frankfurt am Main and graduated from highschool in Munich. She studied law at the University of Regensburg, graduating in 1993. Hubig worked as a judge and state attorney before entering politics.

== Political career ==
=== Career in national politics ===
Following the 2013 national elections, Hubig was appointed State Secretary at the Federal Ministry of Justice and Consumer Protection under minister Heiko Maas, in the coalition government led by Chancellor Angela Merkel.

=== Career in state politics ===
Following the 2016 state elections, Hubig was appointed State Minister of Education in Rhineland-Palatinate. In this capacity, she has also been also one of the state’s representatives on the Bundesrat, where she serves on the Committee on Cultural Affairsand the Committee on Women and Youth. She also chaired the Standing Conference of the Ministers of Education and Cultural Affairs in 2020.

In the negotiations to form a so-called traffic light coalition of the SPD, the Green Party and the Free Democratic Party (FDP) following the 2021 German elections, Hubig was part of her party's delegation in the working group on education policy, co-chaired by Andreas Stoch, Felix Banaszak and Jens Brandenburg. Amid the formation of the cabinet of Chancellor Olaf Scholz, she was mentioned by numerous news outlets as a potential candidate for a cabinet post; however, she remained in her role in Rhineland-Palatinate.

Upon her appointment as the federal minister of justice, Hubig was succeeded by Sven Teuber on 14 May 2025.

=== Minister of Justice, 2025–present ===
In the negotiations to form a Grand Coalition under the leadership of Friedrich Merz's Christian Democrats (CDU together with the Bavarian CSU) and the SPD following the 2025 German elections, Hubig was again part of the SPD delegation in the working group on education, research and innovation, this time led by Karin Prien, Katrin Staffler and Oliver Kaczmarek. Upon the formation of the Merz cabinet, she was appointed Minister of Justice and Consumer Protection.

== Other activities ==
- Stiftung Lesen, Member of the Board of Trustees
