= Katharina Binz =

German politician (born 1983)

Katharina Binz MdBR

Deputy Minister President of Rhineland-Palatinate
- In office 8 December 2021 – 18 May 2026
- Preceded by: Anne Spiegel
- Succeeded by: Sabine Bätzing-Lichtenthäler

Minister for Family, Women, Culture and Integration of Rhineland-Palatinate
- In office 18 May 2021 – 18 May 2026
- Preceded by: Anne Spiegel
- Succeeded by: Sven Teuber

Member of the Landtag of Rhineland-Palatinate
- In office 1 April 2017 – 18 May 2021
- Succeeded by: Daniel Köbler
- Constituency: Mainz 1

Chairwoman of Alliance 90/The Greens in Rhineland-Palatinate
- In office 20 April 2013 – 20 May 2017
- Preceded by: Britta Steck
- Succeeded by: Jutta Paulus

Personal details
- Born: 30 October 1983 (age 42) Zell, West Germany (now Germany)
- Party: Alliance 90/The Greens
- Children: 1
- Education: University of Mainz
- Website: katharinabinz.de

Katharina Binz (born 30 October 1983) is a German politician of Alliance 90/The Greens who served as Minister for Family, Women, Culture and Integration in the governments of Ministers-President Malu Dreyer and Alexander Schweitzer from 2021 to 2026. She was also part of the German Bundesrat for Rhineland-Palatinate from 2021. In December 2021 she succeeded Anne Spiegel, as Deputy Minister-President of Rhineland-Palatinate.

== Early life and education ==
Binz grew up in Mesenich and Moritzheim (Hunsrück). She graduated from high school in 2003 and moved to Mainz, where she studied political science, history and philosophy at the Johannes Gutenberg University. In the 2005-2006 election period, she was chairperson of the AStA at Mainz University. She then moved from the level of local student politics to the national level and was a board member of the national student association "freier zusammenschluss von student*innenschaften". The AStA of the University of Mainz was able to win her back as a speaker for political education in 2009.

== Political career ==
Since 2007, Binz has been a member of the district executive of Bündnis 90/Die Grünen Mainz. She became active in local politics in the 2009 local elections in Rhineland-Palatinate, in which she won a seat on the Mainz city council. She was also elected as a successor for one of three seats for the Greens on the local council of the Hartenberg-Münchfeld district, and took up the mandate on 8 August 2011. She left this body on 30 November 2013 due to a move to Mainz-Finthen.

From 20 April 2013 to 20 May 2017, Binz was state chairwoman of Bündnis 90/Die Grünen Rhineland-Palatinate. On 1 April 2017, she succeeded Eveline Lemke in the State Parliament of Rhineland-Palatinate and resigned as state chairwoman on 20 May 2017.

Binz stood for the Greens in the Mainz I constituency for the 2021 Rhineland-Palatinate state election and won the first direct mandate for the Greens in the Rhineland-Palatinate state parliament here with 29.6 percent of the primary vote. On 18 May 2021, she was appointed Minister for Family, Women, Culture and Integration in the Cabinet Dreyer III. In the course of this, she resigned her state parliament mandate. Daniel Köbler succeeded her in the Landtag.

Binz was nominated by her party as delegate to the Federal Convention for the purpose of electing the President of Germany in 2022.

== Other activities ==
- Cultural Foundation of the German States (KdL), Ex-Officio Member of the Council (since 2021)
