= Michael Frisch =

German politician (born 1957)

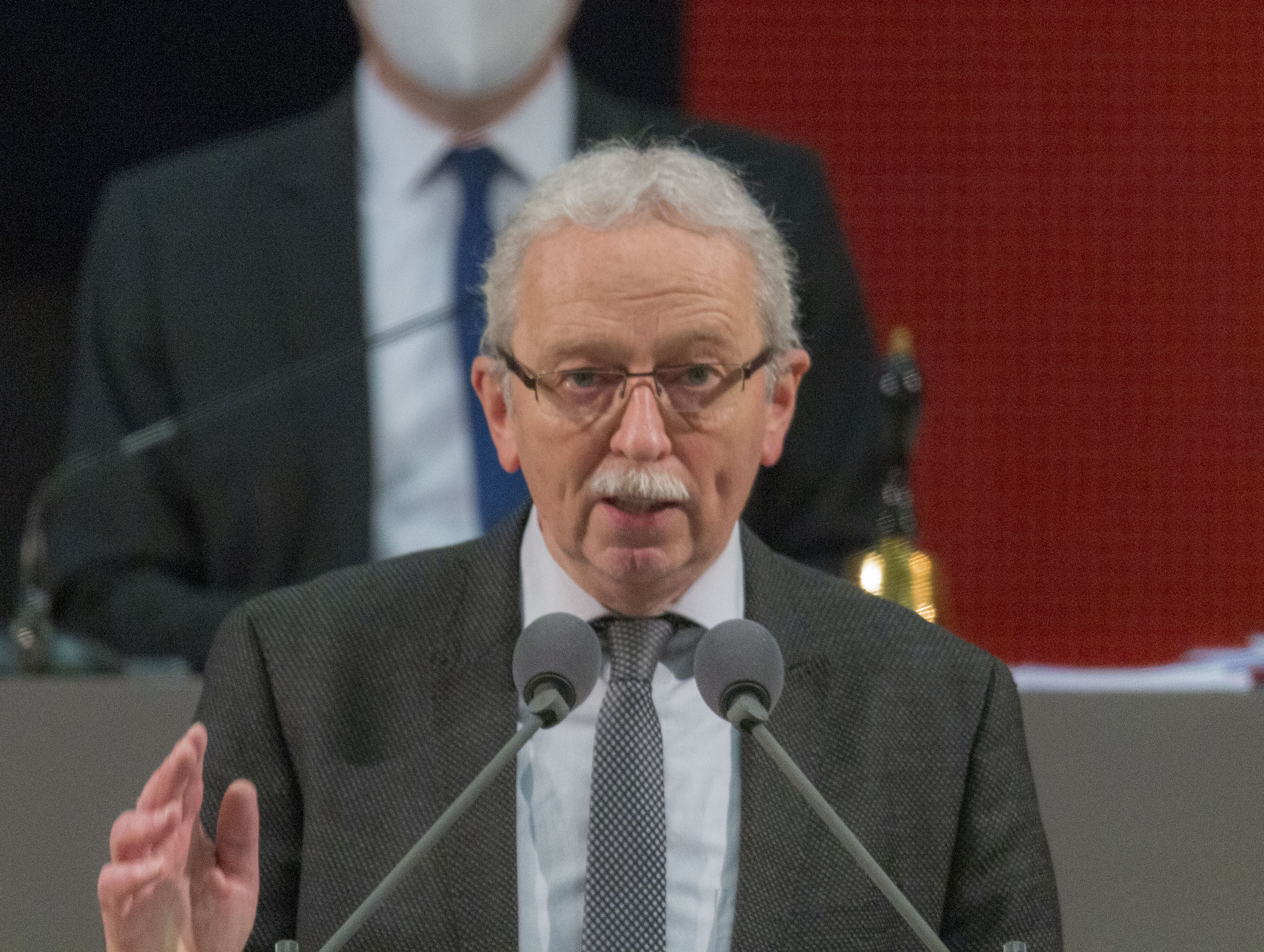
- Frisch in 2021
- Incumbent
- Assumed office November 2019

Member of the Landtag of Rhineland-Palatinate
- Incumbent
- Assumed office 18 May 2016

Personal details
- Born: Michael Frisch; 4 September 1957 (age 68) Trier, Rhineland-Palatinate
- Party: Alternative for Germany

Michael Frisch (born 4 September 1957) is a German politician of Alternative for Germany (AfD). He has been leader of the party's Rhineland-Palatinate branch since November 2019.

Frisch teaches mathematics and Catholic religion at the vocational school for nutrition, home economics and social affairs in Trier. He became a member of AfD in 2013. On 13 March 2016, he was elected to the Landtag of Rhineland-Palatinate in the 2016 state election. Frisch is AfD district chairman in Trier and a state board member of AfD Rhineland-Palatinate. On 25 May 2014, he became chairman of the AfD parliamentary group in the Trier city council. In November 2019, he was elected state chairman of the Rhineland-Palatinate AfD. In September 2020, he was chosen as the party's lead candidate for the 2021 state election.
