= Clemens Hoch =

German politician (born 1978)

Minister of Science and Health of Rhineland-Palatinate
- Incumbent
- Assumed office 18 May 2021
- Minister-President: Malu Dreyer; Alexander Schweitzer

Personal details
- Born: 5 January 1978 (age 48) Andernach
- Party: Social Democratic Party (since 1996)

Clemens Hoch (born 5 January 1978 in Andernach) is a German politician serving as minister of science and health of Rhineland-Palatinate since 2021. He has been a member of the Landtag of Rhineland-Palatinate since 2016, having previously served from 2006 to 2013.
