= Michael Ebling =

German politician (born 1967)

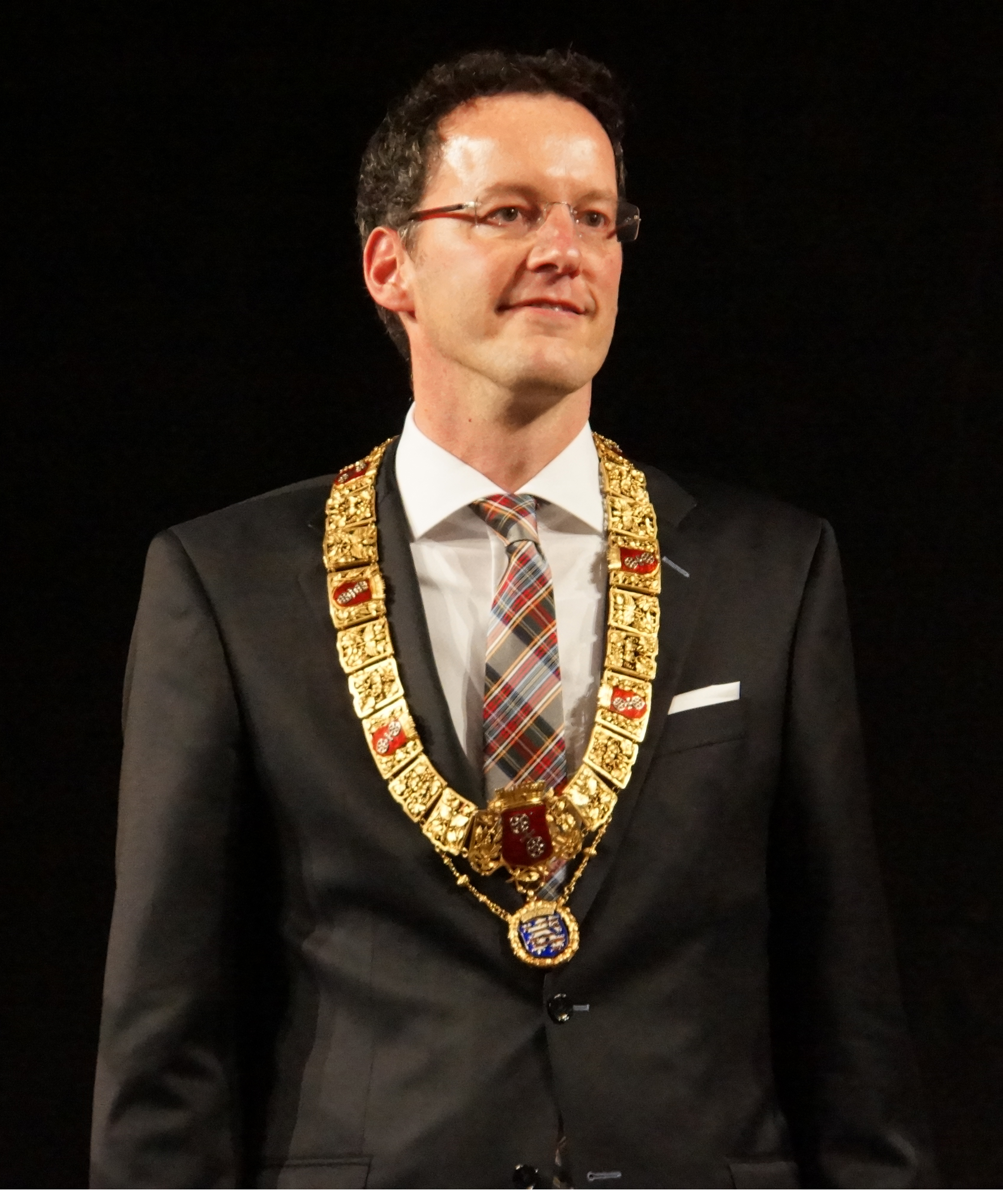
Ebling after his inauguration as Mayor of Mainz in 2012

Michael Ebling (born 27 January 1967) is a German politician of the Social Democratic Party (SPD) who served as State Minister of the Interior in the government of Minister-President Malu Dreyer of Rhineland-Palatinate since 2022. From 2012 to 2022, he was the mayor of Mainz.

== Early life and education ==
After passing the Abitur at Gonsbach-Gymnasium in 1986, Ebling served for 20 months in the civilian service, or Zivildienst, caring for the disabled. He then studied law at the University of Mainz, and took on a political career as assistant to Klaus Hammer, member of the Landtag of Rhineland-Palatinate and chairman of the regional SPD. Later, he worked as an advisor to the ministry of education, science, and culture of the State of Rhineland-Palatinate, joining the office of minister of State Jürgen Zöllner.

== Political career ==
Ebling joined the SPD at the age of 16. He took an active part in the Mainz city council between 1994 and 2002, taking a lead position as his parliamentary group's spokesman for cultural affairs. He also was a member of the executive committee of his party's parliamentary group. Between 1995 and 2007 he was chairman of the SPD at Mombach, succeeding to Ursula Distelhut as a representative of the borough of Mainz-Mombach.

Ebling was elected vice president of his party's parliamentary group in 1998, only to be chosen as president in November 2008. He was elected full-time deputy mayor for social affairs, youth, health and housing in 2002, after his predecessor Malu Dreyer changed to the third cabinet of Minister-President Kurt Beck of Rhineland-Palatinate. Since 2006, Ebling joined the office of Doris Ahnen as Secretary of State in the ministry of education, science, and culture of Rhineland-Palatinate. In this position he is member of the external advisory board of the Graduate School of Excellence – Materials Science in Mainz.

== Mayor of Mainz ==
In a ballot on 25 March 2012 Michael Ebling was elected mayor of Mainz, gaining 58.2 percent of the votes cast against his competitor Günther Beck (Alliance '90/The Greens) who came out second with 41.8 percent. Ebling was successful with an election programme putting social aspects and education policy on top of the agenda. He is the first native from Mainz to be elected mayor of his home town since 1965. On 10 November 2019, Ebling was reelected as mayor of Mainz. He gained 55.2 percent of the votes.

In the negotiations to form a coalition government under the leadership of Chancellor Angela Merkel following the 2017 federal elections, Ebling was part of the working group on municipalities and rural areas, led by Reiner Haseloff, Kurt Gribl and Michael Groschek.

== Minister of the Interior of Rhineland-Palatinate ==
After Roger Lewentz announced his resignation from the office of Interior Minister of Rhineland-Palatinate on 12 October 2022, Ebling was appointed as his successor the following day.

== Personal life ==
Ebling is out as gay.
