= Daniela Schmitt =

German politician

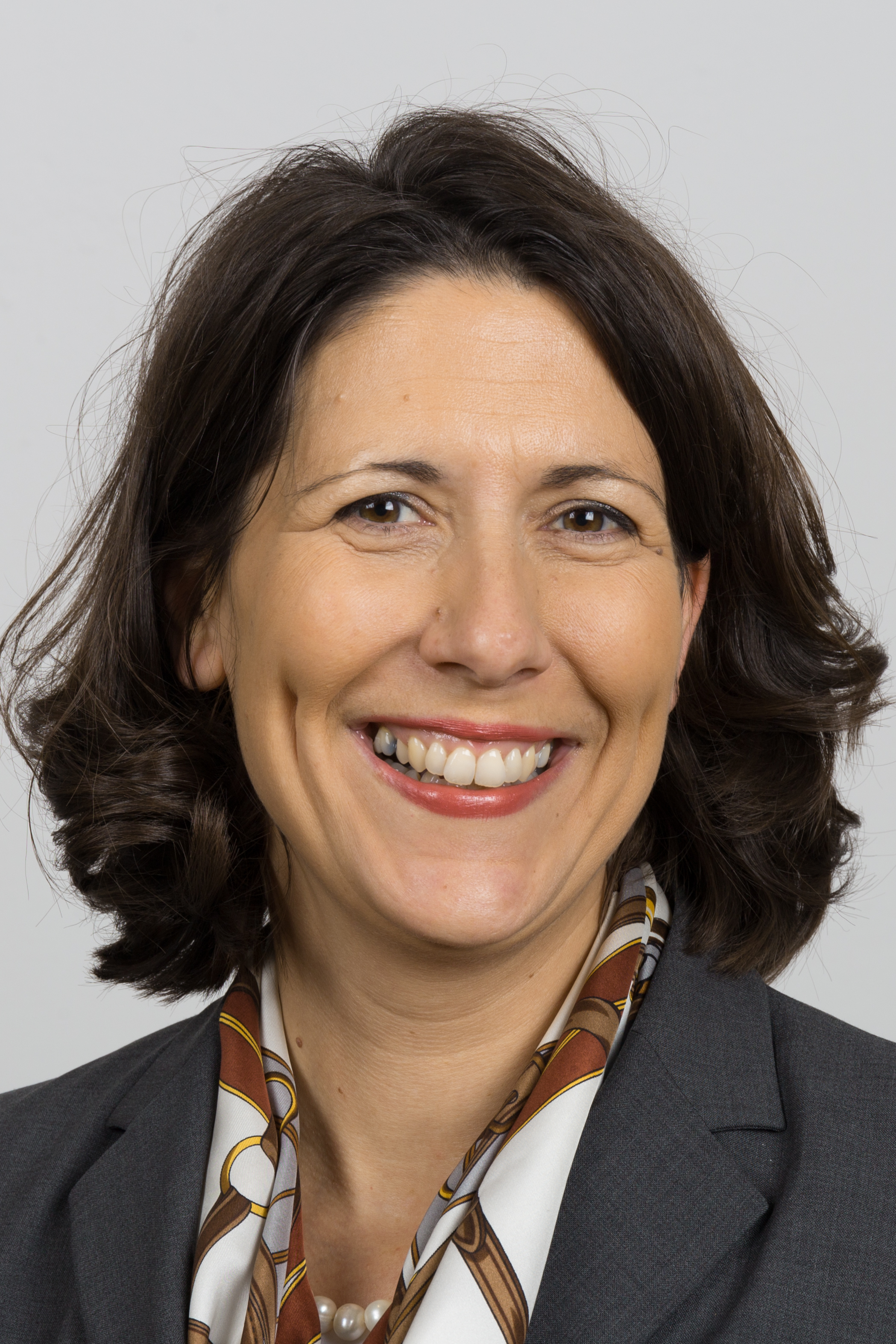
- Schmitt in 2016

State Minister for Economics, Transport, Agriculture and Viticulture
- In office 18 May 2021 – 2026
- Premier: Malu Dreyer; Alexander Schweitzer
- Preceded by: Volker Wissing

Deputy Leader of the Free Democratic Party in Rhineland-Palatinate
- In office 2013–2026 Serving with Sandra Weeser
- Leader: Volker Wissing

Member of the Federal Executive of the Free Democratic Party
- Incumbent
- Assumed office 2013

Personal details
- Born: Daniela Schmitt; 5 August 1972 (age 53) Alzey, Rhineland-Palatinate, West Germany (now Germany)
- Party: Free Democratic Party

Daniela Schmitt (born 5 August 1972) is a German politician of the Free Democratic Party (FDP) who served as State Minister for Economics, Transport, Agriculture and Viticulture in the state government of Rhineland-Palatinate from 2021 until 2026. From 2013 until 2021, she was Secretary of State for Economic Affairs, Transport, Agriculture and Viticulture under minister Volker Wissing.

Since 2013, Schmitt has also been deputy leader of the state FDP and a member of the party's federal executive.

== Education and early career ==
After completing an apprenticeship as a bank clerk, Schmitt studied financial business administration and successfully completed her degree at the Frankfurt School of Finance & Management in 2011. From 2011 to 2016 she was director of the Bingen/Ingelheim and Mainz regional markets of the Mainzer Volksbank and honorary commercial judge at the Mainz regional court.

== Political career ==
Following the 2016 state elections, Schmitt joined the government of Minister-President Malu Dreyer, deputising Minister Volker Wissing. Since 2013, she has also been deputy chairwoman of the FDP in Rhineland-Palatinate under Wissing's leadership and a member of the party's federal executive under the leadership of chairman Christian Lindner.

In 2020, Schmitt was nominated as the FDP's lead candidate for the 2021 Rhineland-Palatinate state election.

As one of the state's representatives at the Bundesrat since 2021, Schmitt serves on the Committee on Agriculture and Consumer Protection, the Committee on Economic Affairs and the Committee on Transport. She is also a member of the German-French Friendship Group set up by the Bundesrat and the French Senate as well as of the German-Polish Friendship Group set up in cooperation with the Senate of Poland.

In the negotiations to form a so-called traffic light coalition of the Social Democratic Party (SPD), the Green Party and the FDP on the national level following the 2021 German elections, Schmitt was part of her party's delegation in the working group on economic affairs, co-chaired by Carsten Schneider, Cem Özdemir and Michael Theurer.

Schmitt was nominated by her party as delegate to the Federal Convention for the purpose of electing the President of Germany in 2022.

== Other activities ==
- Germany Trade and Invest (GTAI), Member of the Supervisory Board
- University of Applied Sciences Bingen, Member of the Board of Trustees (since 2012)
