= Irene Alt =

German politician (born 1957)

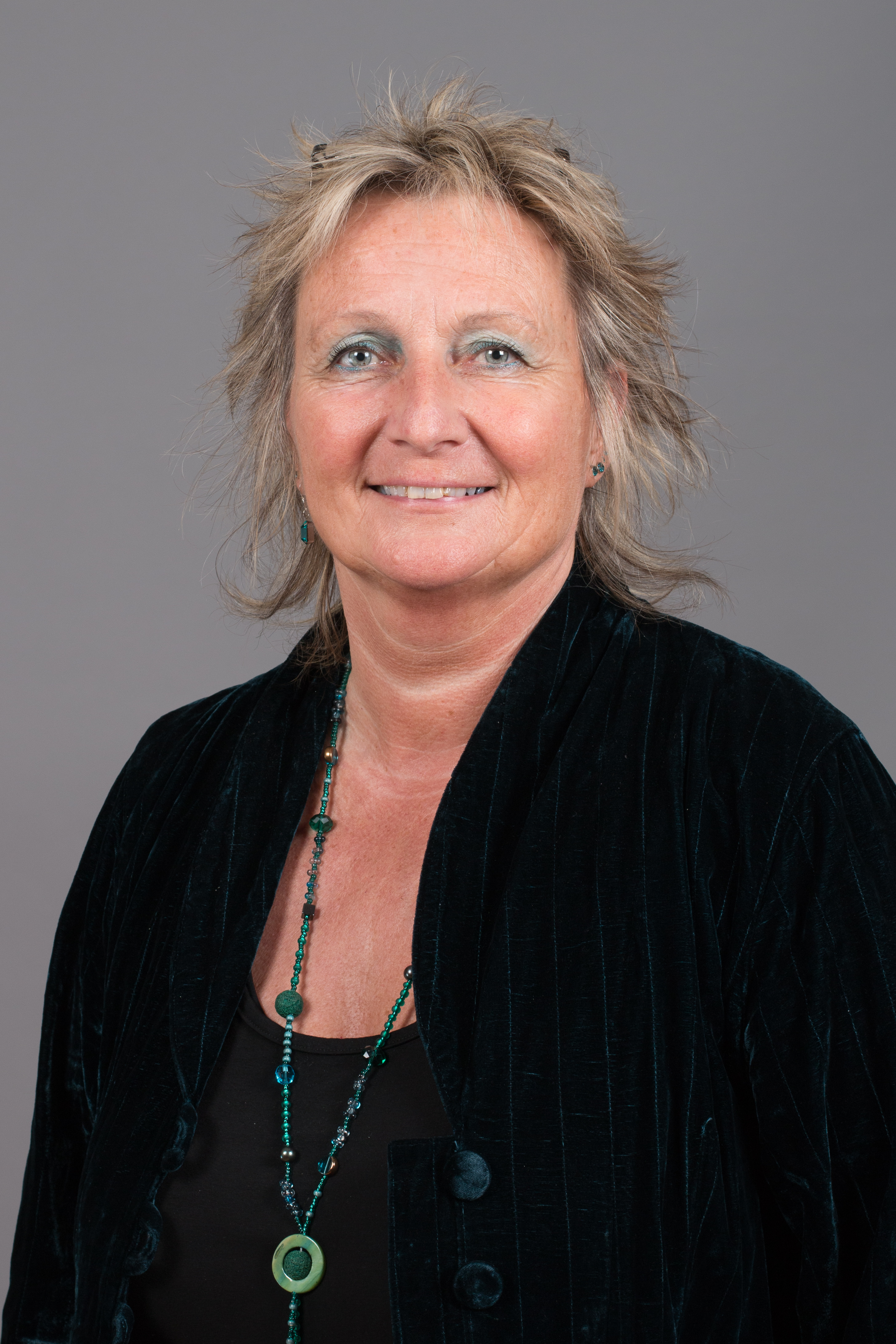
- Alt in 2014
- Born: Irene Alt; 5 October 1957 (age 68); Saarlandian town of Völklingen
- Occupation: politician
- Notable work: Minister for family affairs in the federal state of Rhineland-Palatinate from 2011 to 2016.
- Successor: Anne Spiegel

Irene Alt (born 5 October 1957) is a German politician for the Alliance 90 / The Greens and was minister for family affairs in the federal state of Rhineland-Palatinate from 2011 to 2016.

== Life and politics ==
Alt was born in 1957 in the Saarlandian town of Völklingen and became member of the Greens in 1998.

Alt was minister for family affairs from 2011 to 2016. Her successor was Anne Spiegel.
