= Florian Funk =

German politician (born 1998)

- Funk in 2024

Member of the Landtag of Rhineland-Palatinate
- Incumbent
- Assumed office 16 November 2026
- Preceded by: Alexander Schweitzer
- Constituency: Südliche Weinstraße

Personal details
- Born: 1998 (age 27–28)
- Party: Social Democratic Party

Florian Funk (born 1998) is a German politician serving as a member of the Landtag of Rhineland-Palatinate since 2026. He has served as chairman of the Social Democratic Party in Südliche Weinstraße since 2022.
