= Philipp Fernis =

German politician (born 1982)

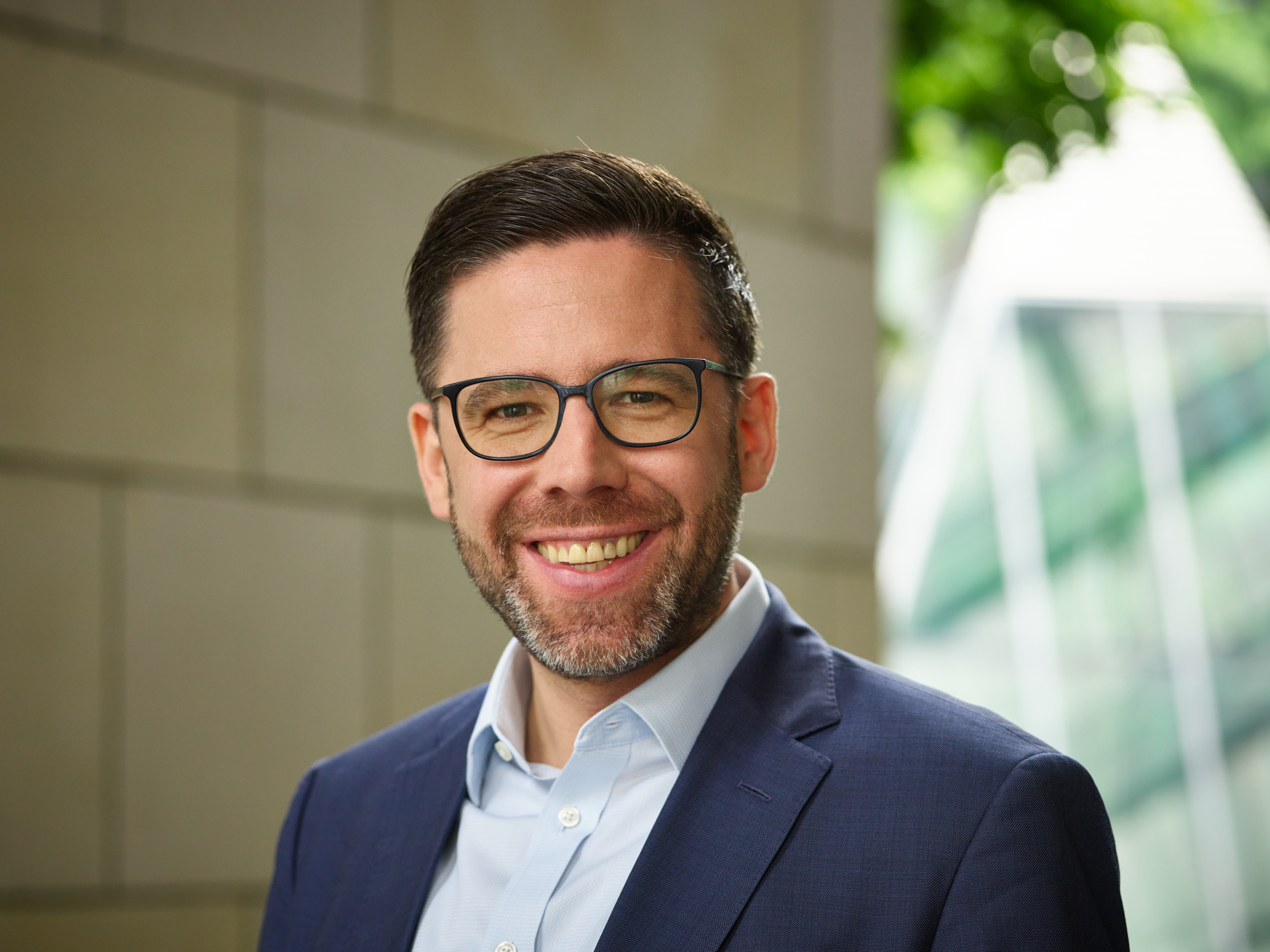
- Fernis in 2021

Minister of Justice of Rhineland-Palatinate
- Incumbent
- Assumed office 2 April 2025
- Minister-President: Alexander Schweitzer
- Preceded by: Herbert Mertin

Personal details
- Born: 20 May 1982 (age 44) Mainz
- Party: Free Democratic Party

Philipp Fernis (born 20 May 1982 in Mainz) is a German politician of the Free Democratic Party (FDP) who served as State Minister of Justice of Rhineland-Palatinate from 2025 to 2026. He was a member of the Landtag of Rhineland-Palatinate from 2021 to 2026.
