= Volker Wissing =

German politician (born 1970)

Volker Wissing MdB
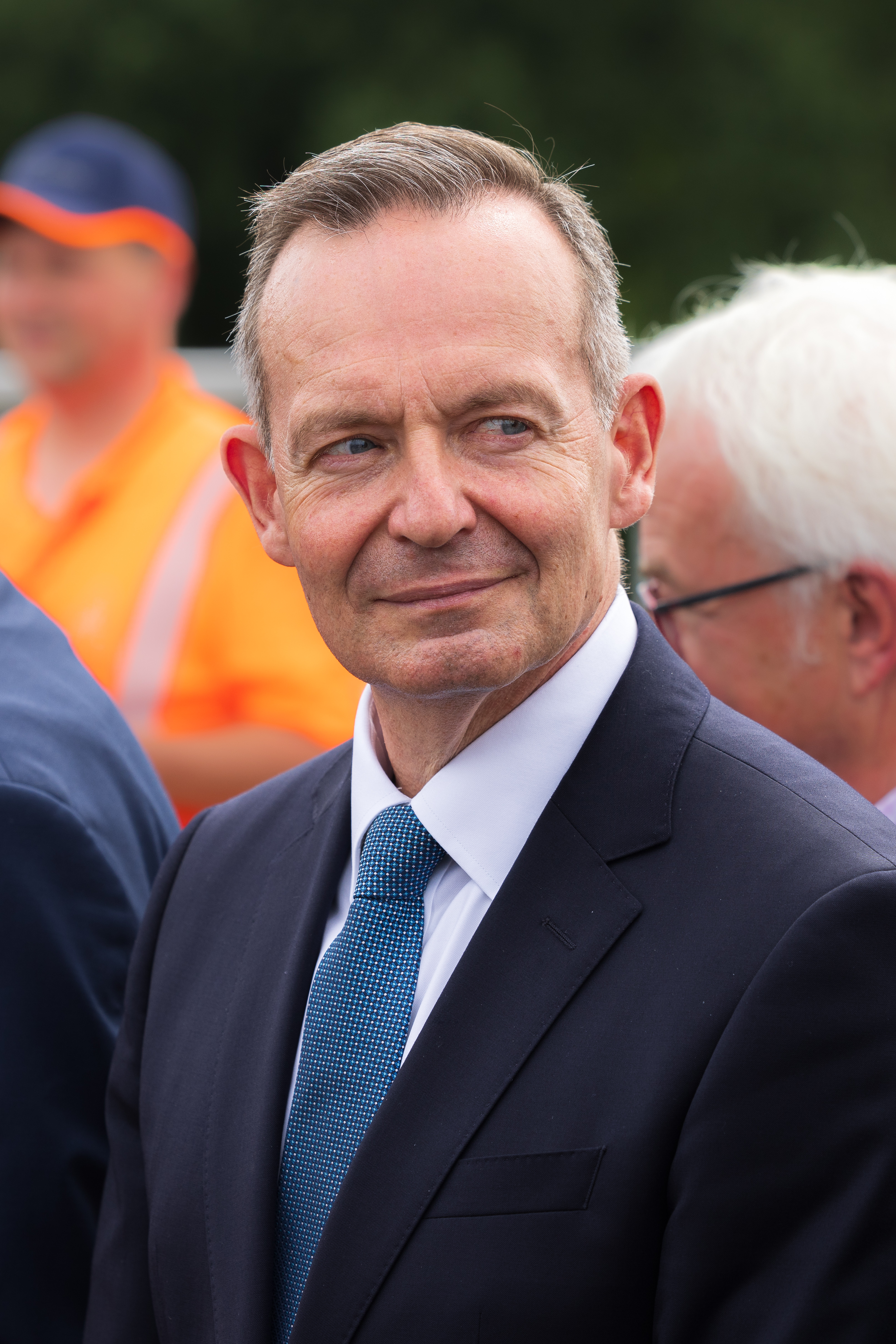
- Wissing in 2023

Minister of Justice
- In office 7 November 2024 – 6 May 2025
- Chancellor: Olaf Scholz
- Preceded by: Marco Buschmann
- Succeeded by: Stefanie Hubig

Minister of Digital Affairs and Transport
- In office 8 December 2021 – 6 May 2025
- Chancellor: Olaf Scholz
- Preceded by: Andreas Scheuer
- Succeeded by: Patrick Schnieder

General Secretary of the Free Democratic Party
- In office 19 September 2020 – 23 April 2022
- Leader: Christian Lindner
- Preceded by: Linda Teuteberg
- Succeeded by: Bijan Djir-Sarai

Leader of the Free Democratic Party in Rhineland-Palatinate
- In office 7 May 2011 – 7 November 2024
- Deputy: Daniela Schmitt; Sandra Weeser
- Preceded by: Rainer Brüderle
- Succeeded by: Daniela Schmitt

Deputy Minister-President of Rhineland-Palatinate
- In office 18 May 2016 – 18 May 2021
- Minister- President: Malu Dreyer
- Preceded by: Eveline Lemke
- Succeeded by: Anne Spiegel

State Minister for Economics, Transport, Agriculture and Viticulture of Rhineland-Palatinate
- In office 18 May 2016 – 18 May 2021
- Minister- President: Malu Dreyer
- Preceded by: Eveline Lemke
- Succeeded by: Daniela Schmitt

Member of the Bundestag for Rhineland-Palatinate
- In office 26 October 2021 – 23 February 2025
- Preceded by: Manuel Höferlin
- Constituency: FDP list
- In office 23 January 2004 – 22 October 2013
- Preceded by: Marita Sehn
- Succeeded by: Manuel Höferlin (2017)
- Constituency: FDP list

Member of the Landtag of Rhineland-Palatinate
- In office 18 May 2016 – 18 May 2021
- Preceded by: Herbert Mertin (2011)
- Succeeded by: Daniela Schmitt
- Constituency: FDP list

Personal details
- Born: 22 April 1970 (age 56) Landau, West Germany
- Party: Independent (2024–present)
- Other political affiliations: FDP (1998–‍2024)
- Children: 1
- Education: Saarland University; University of Freiburg; University of Münster
- Occupation: Politician; Lawyer

Volker Wissing (born 22 April 1970) is a German lawyer and former judge who served as the Minister for Transport in the federal government of Chancellor Olaf Scholz from 2021 to 2025 and as Minister of Justice from 2024 to 2025.

Wissing was previously the Deputy Minister-President of Rhineland-Palatinate in the state government under Minister-President Malu Dreyer from 2016 to 2021 and a member of the German Bundestag from 2004 to 2013. He was the general secretary of the Free Democratic Party from 2020 to 2022. Wissing declared his resignation from the party on 7 November 2024 in order to remain part of the Scholz cabinet in the wake of the 2024 German government crisis. Following the resignation of Marco Buschmann, he also assumed the office of Minister of Justice. The German federal election in February 2025 was a snap election. The FDP got 4.3% of the votes and missed the Five percent hurdle.

== Early life and education ==
Wissing was born 1970 in the German town of Landau in der Pfalz and studied law at the Saarland University.

Wissing achieved a law degree and worked for some time as a judge before he entered professional politics.

== Political career ==
=== Career in national politics ===
Wissing entered the FDP in 1998. He became a member of the German Bundestag in 2004 when he took the seat of Marita Sehn who had died in a car accident. From 2004 until 2013, he served on the Finance Committee; he chaired the committee from 2009 until 2013 (during the Second Merkel cabinet, a CDU/CSU and FDP coalition). From 2011 until 2013, he also served as one of his parliamentary group's deputy chairpersons, under the leadership of chairman Rainer Brüderle.

In the negotiations to form a coalition government of the FDP and the Christian Democrats (CDU together with the Bavarian CSU) following the 2009 federal elections, Wissing was part of the FDP delegation in the working group on financial policy and taxes, led by Thomas de Maizière und Hermann Otto Solms.

=== Career in state politics ===
On the state level, Wissing became chairman of the party's branch in Rhineland-Palatinate in 2011 succeeding Rainer Brüderle. He led the Free Democratic Party back into the Landtag of Rhineland-Palatinate in the March 2016 state election. After coalition negotiations Wissing became Deputy Minister President and State Minister for Economics, Transport, Agriculture and Viticulture in the Second Dreyer cabinet.

In 2020 FDP leader Christian Lindner nominated Wissing to serve as General Secretary of the party, succeeding Linda Teuteberg. Subsequently, Wissing announced his switch for state politics to the federal arena, announcing his candidacy for the Bundestag in the September 2021 German federal election.

=== Minister of Digital Affairs and Transport, 2021–2025 ===
On 24 November 2021, Wissing was nominated by the Federal Executive Committee of the FDP for the post of Minister for Transport and Digital Affairs in the designated federal government. He took office as Transport Minister on 8 December as the Scholz cabinet (the first Traffic light coalition) was sworn in.

On 24 February 2022, Russian forces began their invasion of Ukraine. Two days later, Wissing ordered the blocking of German airspace for Russian aircraft.

In July 2022, Wissing publicly presented his plans to meet emissions reductions targets in the German transport sector, shortly before the deadline. The scientific committee tasked with assessing the sufficiency of his proposed measures declared the plan entirely insufficient and decided not even to evaluate it, given there was "nothing to be evaluated".

In March 2023, Wissing participated in the first joint cabinet meeting of the governments of Germany and Japan in Tokyo, chaired by Chancellor Scholz and Prime Minister Fumio Kishida. In October 2023, he joined the first joint cabinet retreat of the German and French governments in Hamburg, chaired by Olaf Scholz and President Emmanuel Macron.

In November 2024 during government crisis when the FDP withdrew support from the governing coalition, Wissing announced that he would leave the FDP in order to continue his term as Transport Minister. He was additionally appointed Minister of Justice on 7 November 2024 after the incumbent FDP minister Marco Buschmann was dismissed by President Frank-Walter Steinmeier upon Scholz' request.

== Other activities ==
=== Corporate boards ===
- KfW, Ex-Officio Member of the Board of Supervisory Directors (since 2021)

=== Non-profit organizations ===
- German-Jordanian Society, Member of the Parliamentary Advisory Board
- Association of German Foundations, Member of the Parliamentary Advisory Board (2005-2013)

== Personal life ==
Wissing is married and has a daughter. The family lives in Bad Bergzabern and Berlin's Prenzlauer Berg district.
