= Doris Ahnen =

Lower Saxony Minister for Education

Doris Ahnen MdL MdBR
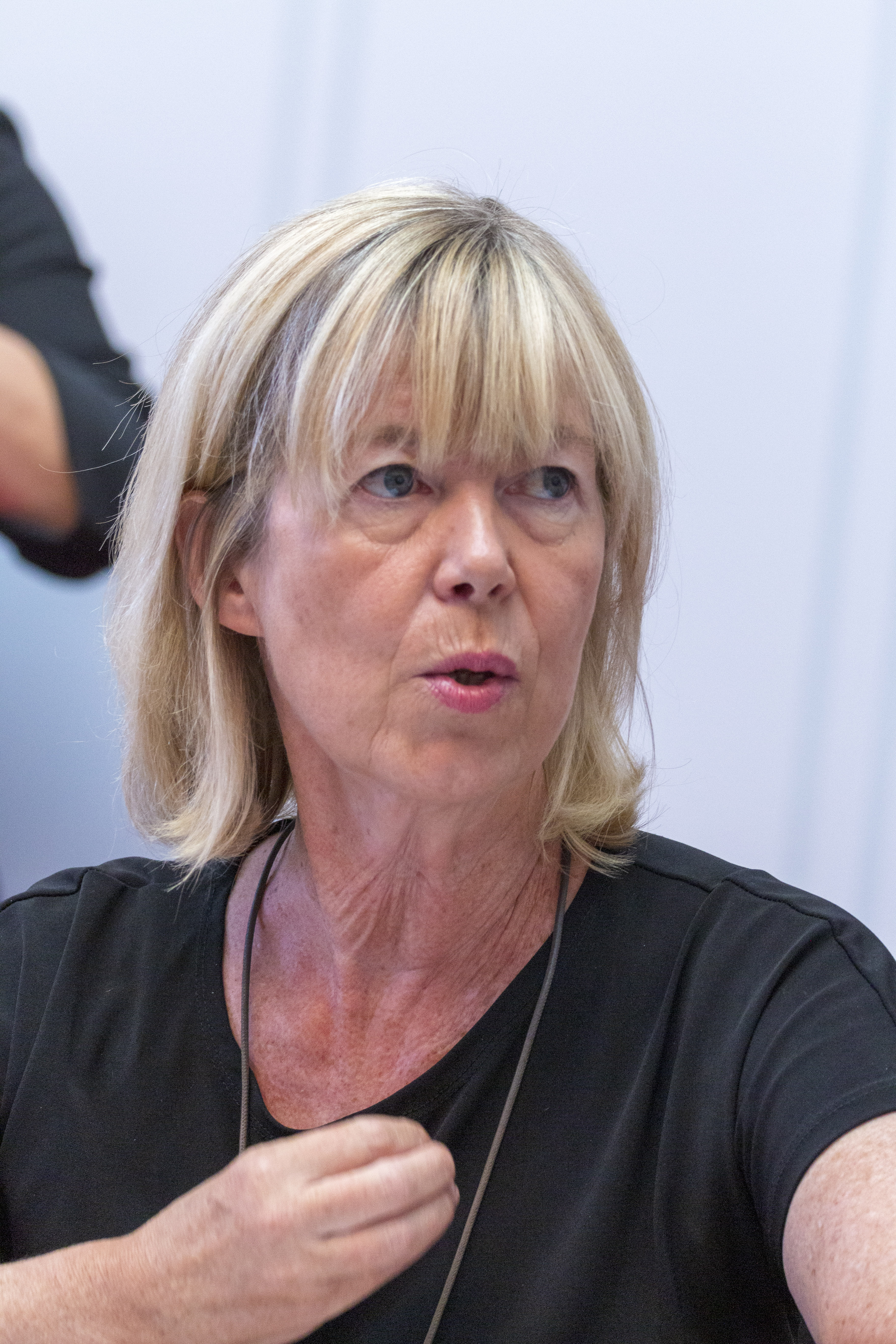
- Ahnen in 2020

Minister for Finance of Rhineland-Palatinate
- Incumbent
- Assumed office 12 November 2014
- Minister President: Malu Dreyer; Alexander Schweitzer
- Preceded by: Carsten Kühl

Member of the Landtag of Rhineland-Palatinate
- Incumbent
- Assumed office 18 May 2006
- Preceded by: Klaus Hammer

Minister for Education, Research and Culture of Rhineland-Palatinate
- In office 18 May 2001 – 12 November 2014
- Minister President: Kurt Beck; Malu Dreyer
- Preceded by: Jürgen Zöllner
- Succeeded by: Vera Reiß

Personal details
- Born: 29 August 1964 (age 62) Trier, West Germany (now Germany)
- Party: Social Democratic Party
- Spouse: Matthias Kollatz-Ahnen (m. 1993; div. 2018)
- Education: University of Mainz (MA)
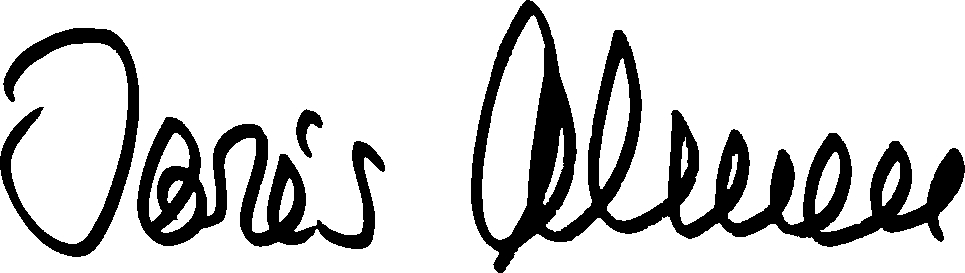
- Signature
- Website: www.doris-ahnen.de

Doris Maria Ahnen is a German politician of the Social Democratic Party (SPD) who has been serving as Minister for Finance in the state government of Rhineland-Palatinate since 2014. Prior to that she served as the Minister for Education, Research and Culture since 2001. She has been a part of the State Parliament of Rhineland-Palatinate since the 2006 elections. She is also a member of the German Bundesrat for Rhineland-Palatinate.

== Political career ==
=== State Minister of Education, 2001–2014 ===
From 2001 until 2014, Ahnen served as State Minister of Education in the government of Minister-President Kurt Beck. In this capacity, she chaired the Standing Conference of the Ministers of Education and Cultural Affairs in 2004.

Since 2004, Ahnen has been serving as deputy chair of the SPD in Rhineland-Palatinate, under the leadership of chairpersons Kurt Beck (2004–2012) and Roger Lewentz (2012–present).

Ahnen co-chaired the SPD's national conventions in Berlin, (2011, 2014, 2015, 2017), Leipzig (2013), Dortmund (2017) and Wiesbaden (2018).

=== State Minister of Finance, 2014–present ===
Since 2014, Ahnen has been serving as State Minister of Finance in the governments of successive Ministers-President Malu Dreyer and Alexander Schweitzer. In this capacity, she is one of the state's representatives at the Bundesrat, where she serves on the Finance Committee and the Committee on Urban Development, Housing and Regional Planning.

During the negotiations to form a coalition government under Chancellor Angela Merkel following the 2013 federal elections, Ahnen led the SPD delegation in the working group on education and research; her co-chair from the CDU/CSU was Johanna Wanka. In the negotiations to form Merkel's fourth coalition government following the 2017 federal elections, she was part of the working group on financial policies and taxes, led by Peter Altmaier, Andreas Scheuer and Olaf Scholz.

In the negotiations to form a so-called traffic light coalition of the SPD, the Green Party and the FDP following the 2021 federal elections, Ahnen led her party's delegation in the working group on financial regulation and the national budget; her co-chairs from the other parties were Lisa Paus and Christian Dürr.

Ahnen was nominated by her party as delegate to the Federal Convention for the purpose of electing the President of Germany in 2022.

== Personal life ==
Ahnen was married to fellow SPD politician Matthias Kollatz-Ahnen from 1993 until 2018.

== Other activities ==
- Friedrich Ebert Foundation (FES), Member of the Board (since 2018)
- KfW, Ex-Officio Member of the Board of Supervisory Directors
- Education and Science Workers' Union (GEW), Member
