= Joachim Streit =

German politician (born 1965)

Joachim Streit MEP
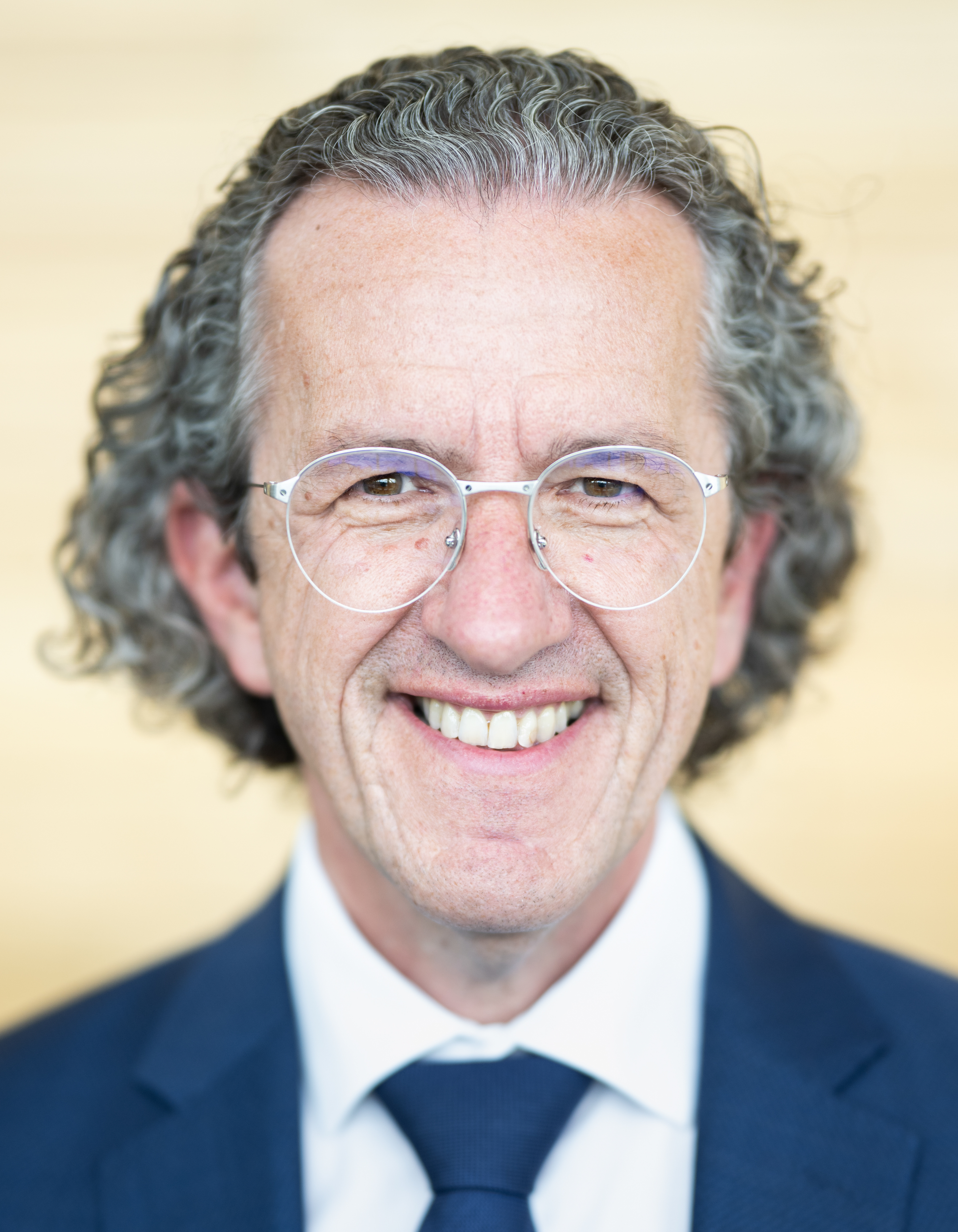
- Streit in 2024

Member of the European Parliament for Germany
- Incumbent
- Assumed office 16 July 2024

Personal details
- Born: 4 June 1965 (age 60)
- Party: Free Voters
- Other political affiliations: Renew Europe

Joachim Streit (born 4 June 1965) is a German politician of Free Voters who was elected member of the European Parliament in 2024. He served in the Landtag of Rhineland-Palatinate from 2021 to 2024.

He has campaigned for admitting Canada into the European Union.
