= Pia Schellhammer =

German politician (born 1985)

Member of the Landtag of Rhineland-Palatinate
- Incumbent
- Assumed office 18 May 2011

Personal details
- Born: 7 February 1985 (age 41) Mainz
- Party: Alliance 90/The Greens (since 2005)

Pia Schellhammer (born 7 February 1985 in Mainz) is a German politician serving as a member of the Landtag of Rhineland-Palatinate since 2011. She has served as group leader of Alliance 90/The Greens since 2023.
