= Sven Teuber =

German politician (born 1982)

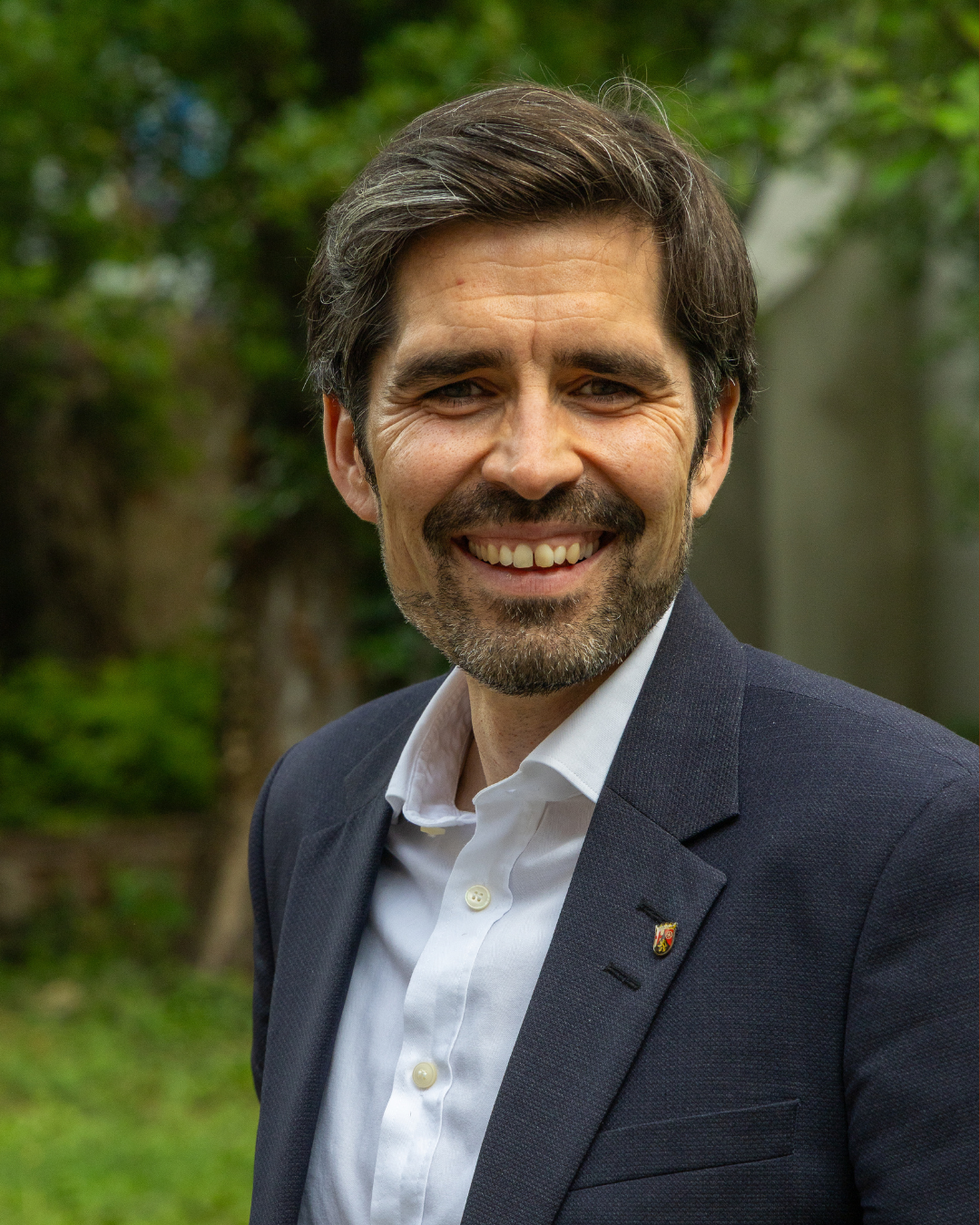
- Teuber in 2025

Minister of Education of Rhineland-Palatinate
- Incumbent
- Assumed office 14 May 2025
- Minister-President: Alexander Schweitzer
- Preceded by: Stefanie Hubig

Personal details
- Born: 30 October 1982 (age 43) Nordhorn
- Party: Social Democratic Party (since 2003)

Sven Teuber (born 30 October 1982 in Nordhorn) is a German politician serving as minister of education of Rhineland-Palatinate since 2025. He has been a member of the Landtag of Rhineland-Palatinate since 2016.
