= Dörte Schall =

German politician (born 1977)

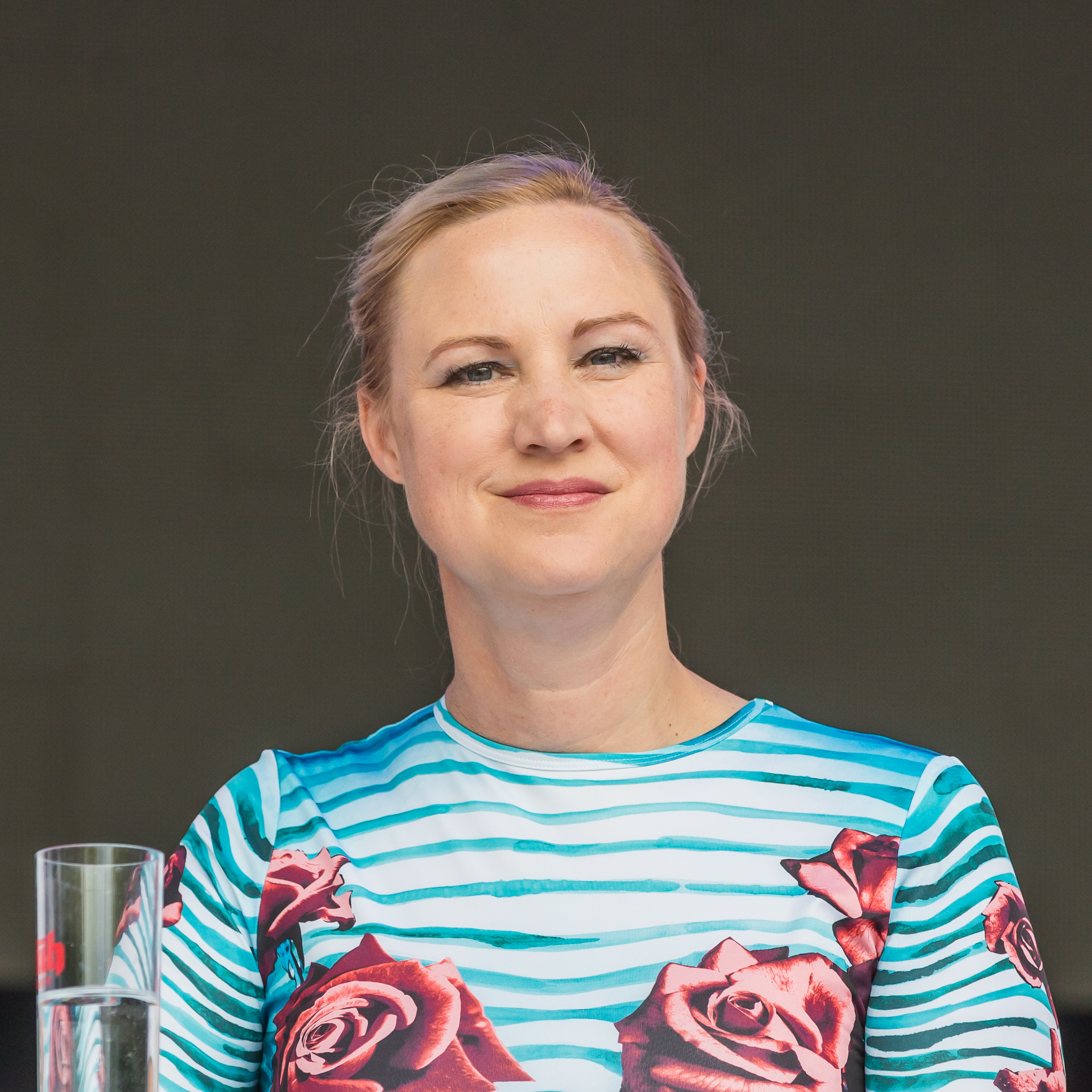
- Schall in 2025

Minister of Labour, Social Affairs, Transformation and Digitalization of Rhineland-Palatinate
- In office 10 July 2024 – 2026
- Minister-President: Alexander Schweitzer
- Preceded by: Alexander Schweitzer

Personal details
- Born: 13 September 1977 (age 48) Ludwigshafen am Rhein
- Party: Social Democratic Party (since 1996)

Dörte Schall (born 13 September 1977 in Ludwigshafen am Rhein) is a German politician who served as minister of labour, social affairs, transformation and digitalization of Rhineland-Palatinate from 2024 to 2026. From 2008 to 2015, she served as chairwoman of the Social Democratic Party in Bonn.
