= 2021 Rhineland-Palatinate state election =

German state election

- 14 March 2021

All 101 seats in the Landtag of Rhineland-Palatinate 51 seats needed for a majority
- Turnout: 1,957,990 (64.4%) ▼6.0%
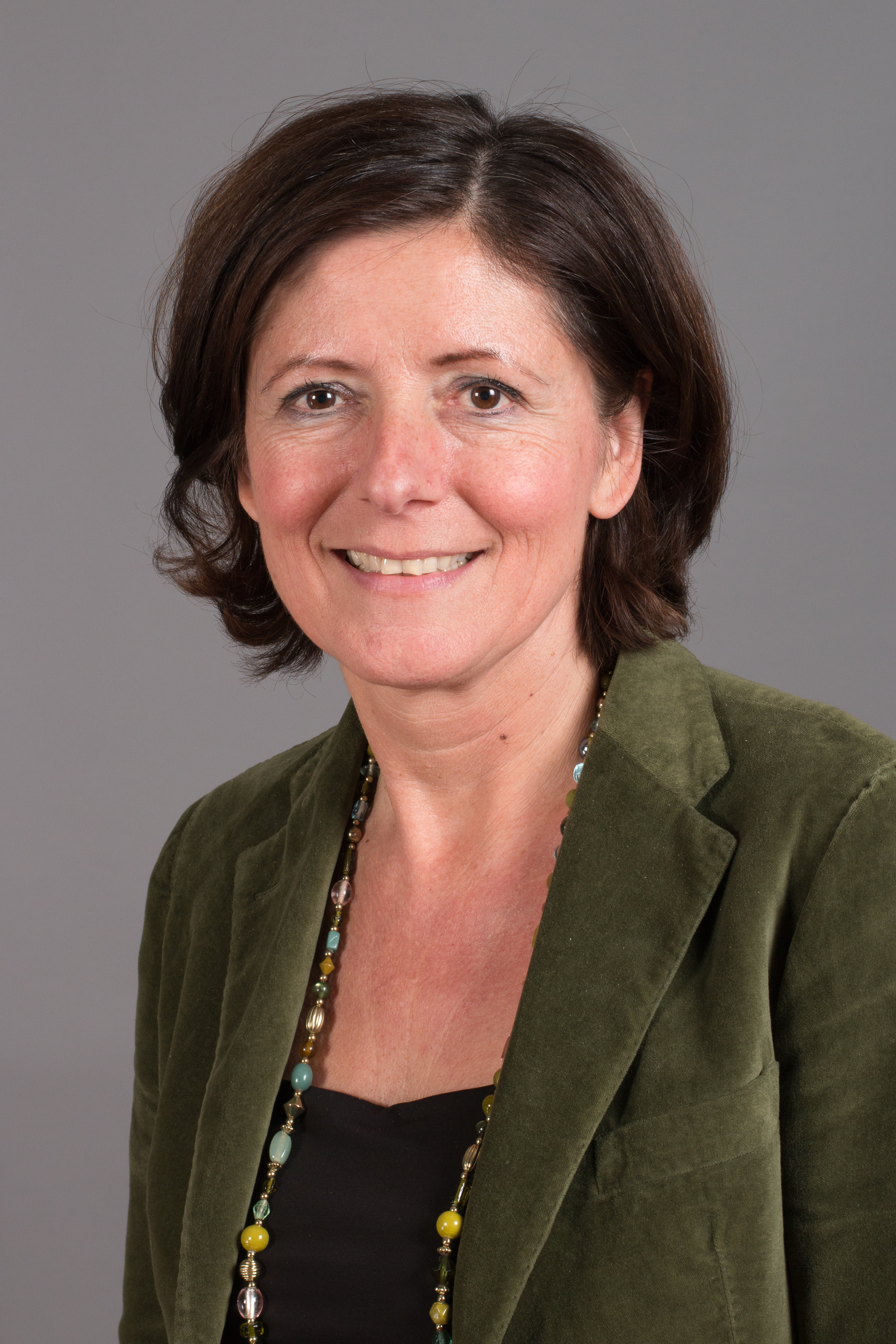

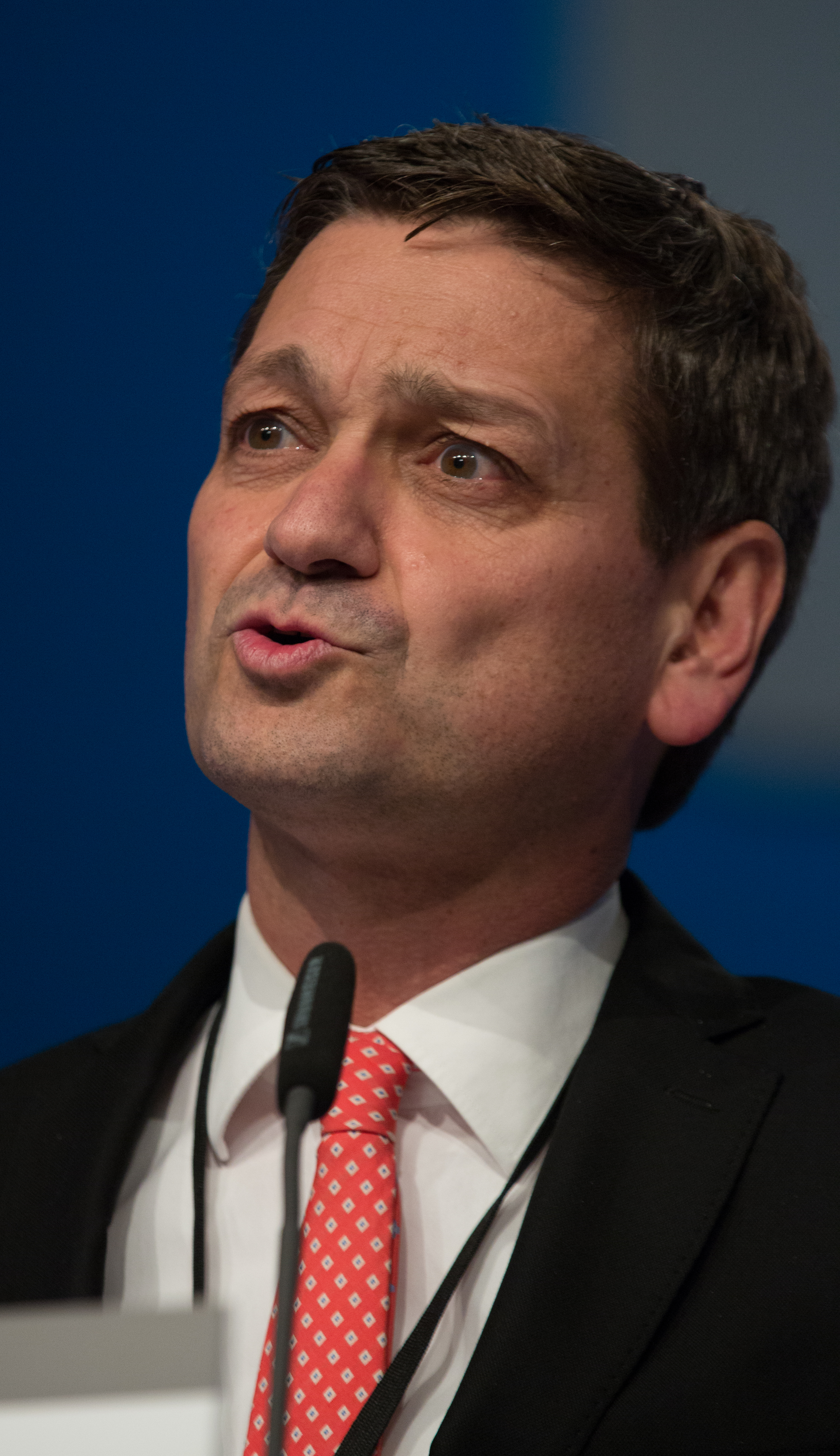

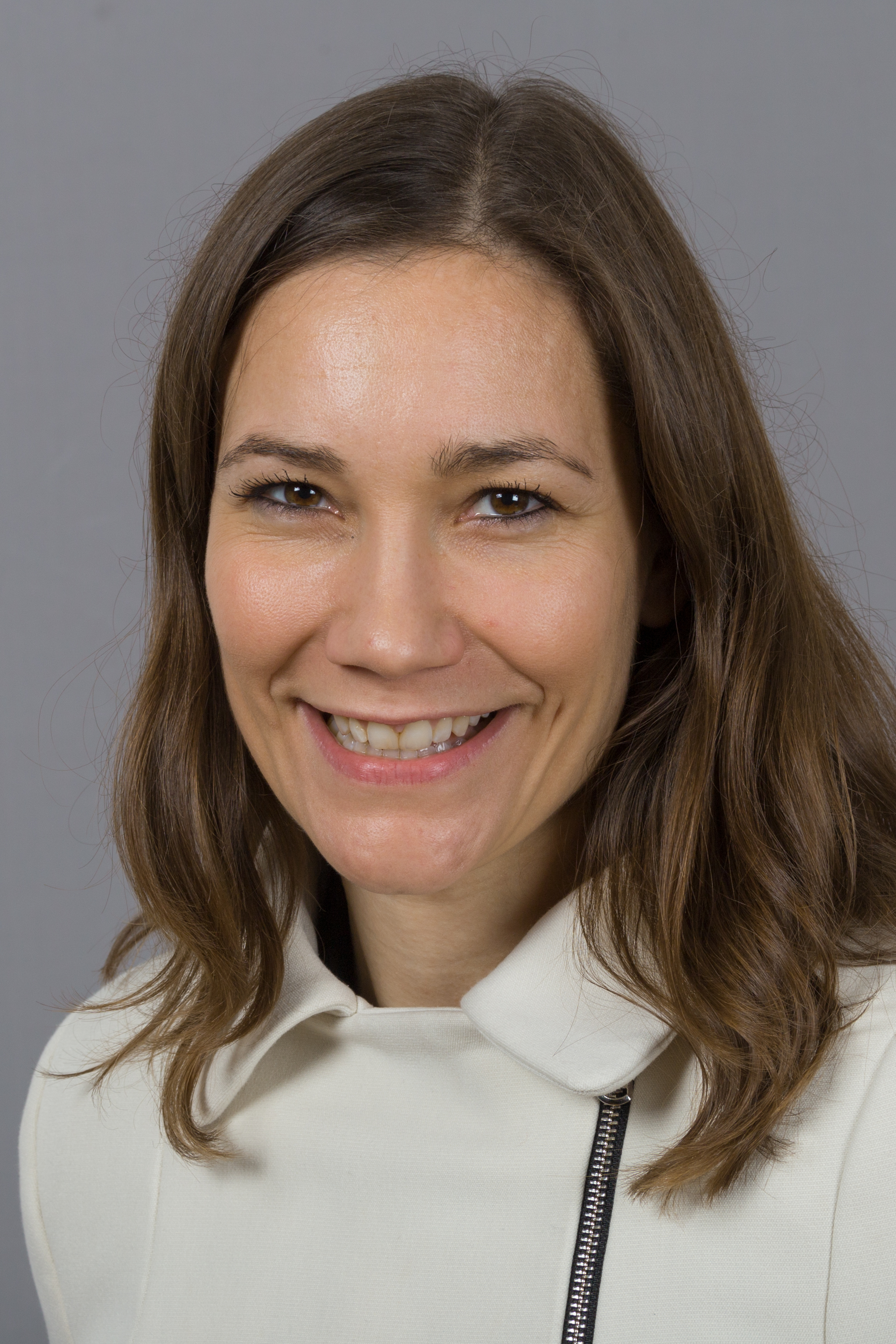

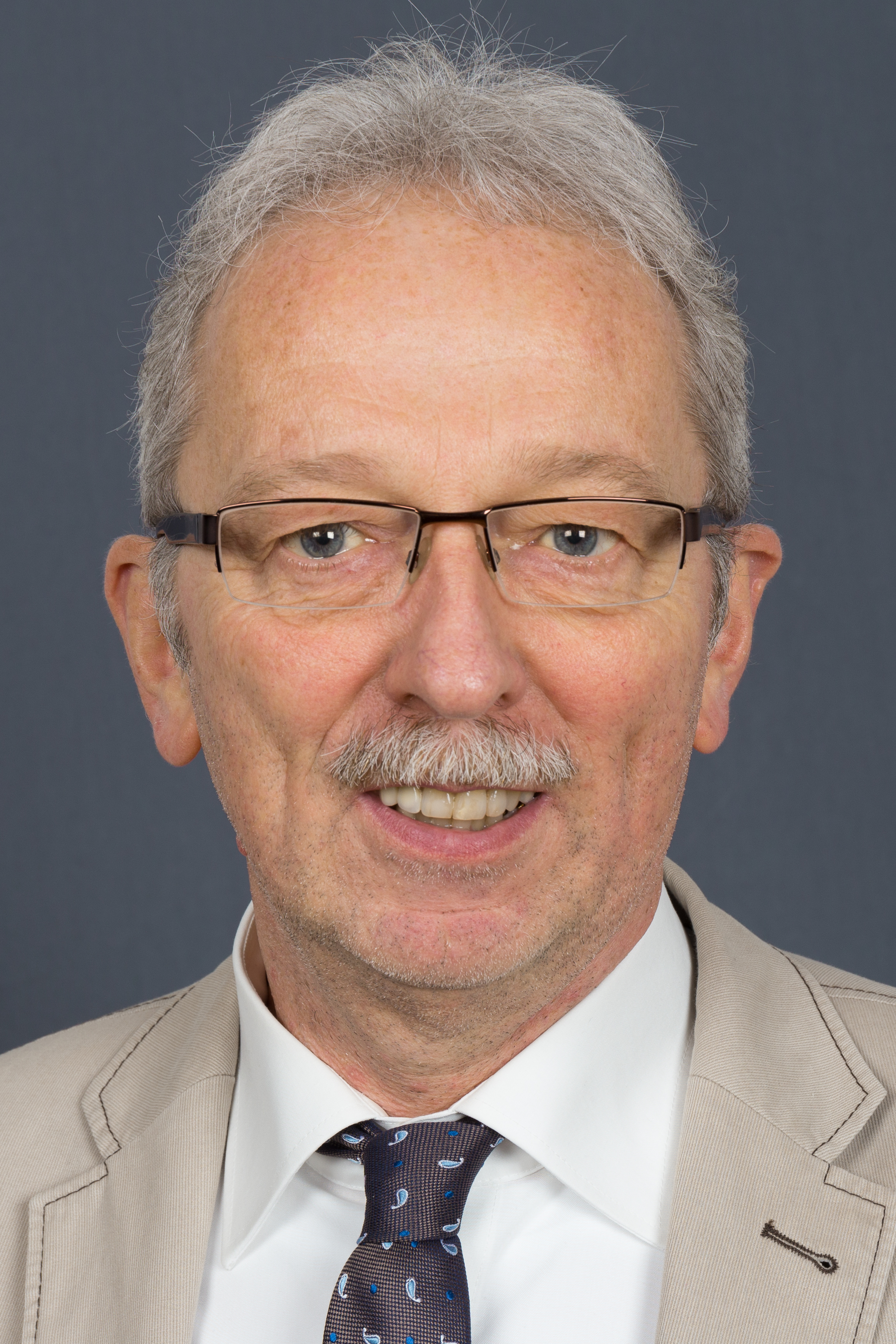

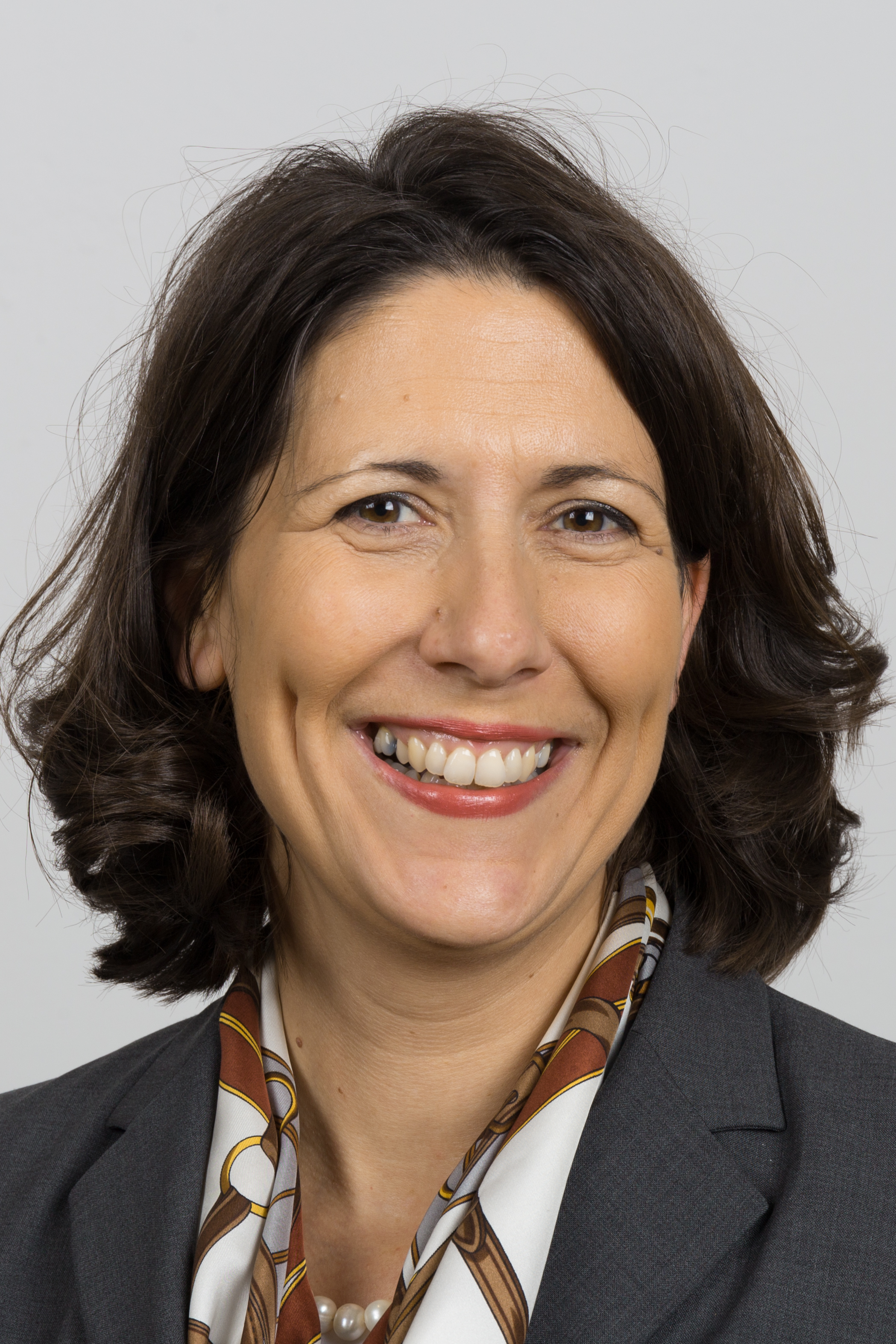

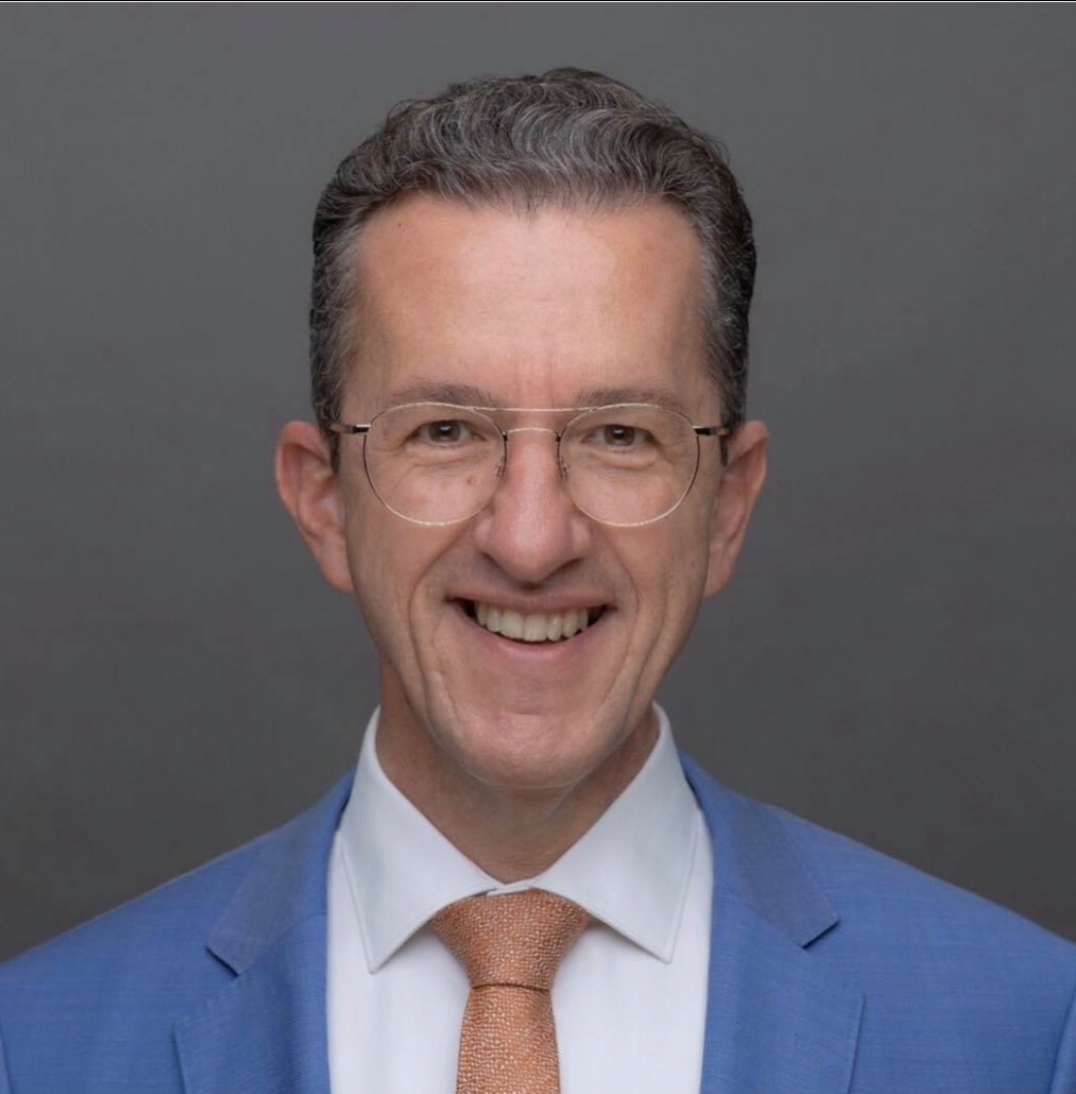
	First party	Second party	Third party
Candidate	Malu Dreyer	Christian Baldauf	Anne Spiegel
Party	SPD	CDU	Greens
Leader's seat	Trier	Frankenthal	List
Last election	39 seats, 36.2%	35 seats, 31.8%	6 seats, 5.3%
Seats won	39	31	10
Seat change	Steady	▼4	▲4
Popular vote	690,962	535,318	179,860
Percentage	35.7%	27.7%	9.3%
Swing	▼0.5%	▼4.1%	▲4.0%
	Fourth party	Fifth party	Sixth party
Candidate	Michael Frisch	Daniela Schmitt	Joachim Streit
Party	AfD	FDP	FW
Leader's seat	List	List	List
Last election	14 seats, 12.6%	7 seats, 6.2%	0 seats, 2.2%
Seats won	9	6	6
Seat change	▼5	▼1	▲6
Popular vote	160,293	106,809	103,619
Percentage	8.3%	5.5%	5.4%
Swing	▼4.3%	▼0.7%	▲3.2%
- Results for the single-member constituencies
Government before election
Second Dreyer cabinet
SPD–FDP–Green
Government after election
Third Dreyer cabinet
SPD–Green–FDP

The 2021 Rhineland-Palatinate state election was held on 14 March 2021 to elect the 18th Landtag of Rhineland-Palatinate. The outgoing government was a "traffic light coalition" of the Social Democratic Party (SPD), Free Democratic Party (FDP), and The Greens led by Minister-President Malu Dreyer.

The SPD won an unexpectedly clear plurality of 35.7% of votes cast, less than one percentage point lower than their 2016 result. The opposition Christian Democratic Union (CDU) finished on 27.7%, a decline of four percentage points, its worst result in the state to date. The Greens moved from fifth to third place with 9.3%. Alternative for Germany (AfD) saw the worst losses of any party, falling to 8.3%. The Free Democratic Party recorded a small decline to 5.5% but retained their seats. The Free Voters (FW) entered the Landtag for the first time with 5.4%, marking their third appearance in a state parliament overall, following Bavaria and Brandenburg.

Overall, the incumbent government was returned with an increased majority. After the election, Minister-President Dreyer expressed her desire to renew the outgoing coalition. On 30 April, the SPD, Greens, and FDP came to a coalition agreement. Dreyer was re-elected as Minister-President on 18 May.

== Election date ==
The period of the 17th Landtag began on 18 April 2016. Landtag elections may take place between 57 and 60 months after the commencement of the term of the previous Landtag; thus, the election may take place between February and May 2021. On 11 February 2020, the state government announced the date of the election as 14 March 2021. A state election was held on the same day in neighbouring state of Baden-Württemberg.

== Electoral system ==
The Landtag is elected via mixed-member proportional representation. 52 members are elected in single-member constituencies via first-past-the-post voting. 49 members are then allocated using compensatory proportional representation, distributed in four multi-member districts. Voters have two votes: the "first vote" for candidates in single-member constituencies, and the "second vote" for party lists, which are used to fill the proportional seats. The minimum size of the Landtag is 101 members, but if overhang seats are present, proportional leveling seats will be added to ensure proportionality. An electoral threshold of 5% of valid votes is applied to the Landtag; parties that fall below this threshold are excluded.

== Background ==
In the previous election held on 13 March 2016, the SPD retained its position as the largest party ahead of the Christian Democratic Union (CDU). Alternative for Germany (AfD) contested its first election in Rhineland-Palatinate, placing third with 12.6%. The FDP returned to the Landtag after falling out in 2011, winning 6.2% and 7 seats. The Greens narrowly retained their representation with 5.3%, a loss of 10.1 percentage points.

The SPD had led a coalition with the Greens since 2011 but lost its majority in the election. The SPD subsequently formed a coalition with the FDP and Greens.

== Parties ==
The table below lists the parties represented in the 17th Landtag.

#	Name		Ideology	Lead candidate	2016 result	
#	Name		Ideology	Lead candidate	Votes (%)	Seats
1	SPD	Social Democratic Party of Germany; Sozialdemokratische Partei Deutschlands	Social democracy	Malu Dreyer	36.2%	39 / 101
2	CDU	Christian Democratic Union of Germany; Christlich Demokratische Union Deutschlands	Christian democracy	Christian Baldauf	31.8%	35 / 101
3	AfD	Alternative for Germany; Alternative für Deutschland	Right-wing populism	Michael Frisch	12.6%	14 / 101
4	FDP	Free Democratic Party; Freie Demokratische Partei	Classical liberalism	Daniela Schmitt	6.2%	7 / 101
5	Grüne	Alliance 90/The Greens; Bündnis 90/Die Grünen	Green politics	Anne Spiegel	5.3%	6 / 101

In addition to the parties already represented in the Landtag, eight other parties contested the election:

#	Name
6	The Left (LINKE)
7	FREE VOTERS Rhineland-Palatinate (FREIE WÄHLER)
8	Pirate Party Germany (PIRATEN)
9	Ecological Democratic Party (ÖDP)
10	Climate List RLP (Klimaliste RLP e. V.)
11	Die PARTEI (PARTEI)
12	Human Environment Animal Protection Party (Tierschutzpartei)
13	Volt Deutschland (Volt)

== Campaign ==
=== Lead candidates ===
On 18 October 2019, the state executive of The Greens nominated Anne Spiegel, Minister for Family, Women, Youth, Integration and Consumer Protection, as the party's lead candidate for the election.

On 16 November 2019, leader of the CDU parliamentary group Christian Baldauf was selected as his party's lead candidate for the election. He won 80.25% of votes against challenger Marlon Bröhr, administrator of the Rhein-Hunsrück district.

On 2 December 2019, Minister-President Malu Dreyer announced her withdrawal from the federal executive of the SPD in order to focus on state politics and the upcoming state election. She had served as co-deputy leader of the federal party since 2017, and was joint acting leader from June to December 2019 after the resignation of leader Andrea Nahles. The announcement came after the 2019 leadership election which saw Saskia Esken and Norbert Walter-Borjans chosen as Nahles' successors. Rhineland-Palatinate state party leader Roger Lewentz stated: "[Dreyer] is the best Minister-President for Rhineland-Palatinate. In the coming year we will do everything we can to ensure that she can continue to hold her post even after the state election in 2021." She was formally confirmed as lead candidate on 7 December 2020.

On 19 August 2020, the state FDP executive chose State Secretary for Economic Affairs Daniela Schmitt as their lead candidate for the election.

On 5 September, AfD announced their list of candidates for the election. State leader Michael Frisch was the lead candidate.

Joachim Streit was the lead candidate for the Free Voters.

== Opinion polling ==
=== Graphical summary ===
Local regression of polls conducted.

=== Party polling ===
Polling firm	Fieldwork date	Sample size	SPD	CDU	AfD	FDP	Grüne	Linke	FW	Others	Lead
2021 state election	14 Mar 2021	–	35.7	27.7	8.3	5.5	9.3	2.5	5.4	5.7	8.0
INSA	11–12 Mar 2021	1,354	32	29	10	7	10	3	4	5	3
Forschungsgruppe Wahlen	8–11 Mar 2021	1,735	33	29	9	6.5	10	3	5	4.5	4
INSA	1–8 Mar 2021	1,501	30	30	10	6	12	3	4	5	Tie
Forschungsgruppe Wahlen	1–4 Mar 2021	998	33	29	9	7	11	3	4	4	4
Infratest dimap	1–3 Mar 2021	1,186	30	28	9	9	12	3	5	4	1
Infratest dimap	19–23 Feb 2021	1,000	30	31	9	7	12	3	4	4	1
INSA	15–22 Feb 2021	1,304	31	33	9	6	12	3	3	3	2
Forschungsgruppe Wahlen	1–4 Feb 2021	1,022	31	33	7	5	13	4	–	7	2
INSA	13–19 Jan 2021	1,006	30	33	9	6	14	3	3	2	3
Infratest dimap	8–12 Jan 2021	1,001	28	33	8	6	15	3	–	7	5
Infratest dimap	4–8 Dec 2020	1,002	28	34	9	5	15	3	–	6	6
INSA	13–20 Oct 2020	1,013	27	33	10	5	14	5	3	3	6
Infratest dimap	4–8 Sep 2020	1,005	26	34	9	6	17	4	–	4	8
Infratest dimap	20–21 Apr 2020	1,003	27	38	8	6	13	4	–	4	11
INSA	16–30 Mar 2020	1,045	24	30	12	5	19	5	–	5	6
Infratest dimap	27 Feb–3 Mar 2020	1,001	26	27	11	7	18	6	–	5	1
Infratest dimap	5–10 Dec 2019	1,002	26	30	13	7	16	4	–	4	4
INSA	9–16 Sep 2019	1,012	22	28	12	8	20	4	3	3	6
Infratest dimap	5–9 Sep 2019	1,001	23	28	11	8	21	4	–	5	5
Infratest dimap	14–18 Mar 2019	1,000	24	31	11	10	14	6	–	4	7
Forsa	1–8 Feb 2019	1,005	26	31	10	8	14	5	–	6	5
Infratest dimap	10–11 Dec 2018	1,001	24	31	13	7	16	4	–	5	7
Infratest dimap	11–15 Oct 2018	1,003	24	28	13	8	18	5	–	4	4
Infratest dimap	14–18 Jun 2018	1,004	29	31	13	7	11	5	–	4	2
Infratest dimap	5–7 Mar 2018	1,001	37	33	8	7	8	3	–	4	4
INSA	2–8 Jan 2018	1,517	33	34	10	7	7	5	–	4	1
Infratest dimap	8–12 Dec 2017	1,003	38	37	6	7	6	3	–	3	1
Infratest dimap	7–11 Sep 2017	1,001	36	36	8	6	6	4	–	4	Tie
GESS Phone & Field	6–17 Jul 2017	1,002	33	37	8	7	6	3	2	4	4
Infratest dimap	14–19 Jun 2017	1,000	32	37	8	7	7	5	–	4	5
Infratest dimap	2–6 Mar 2017	1,001	40	35	7	6	6	3	–	3	5
GESS Phone & Field	9–19 Dec 2016	1,002	34	36	11	5	5	3	2	4	2
Infratest dimap	8–12 Dec 2016	1,000	32	36	10	9	5	4	–	4	4
Infratest dimap	8–12 Jul 2016	1,004	33	33	10	7	8	4	–	5	Tie
GESS Phone & Field	13–20 Jun 2016	1,004	36	31	12	6	6	3	3	3	5
2016 state election	13 Mar 2016	–	36.2	31.8	12.6	6.2	5.3	2.8	2.2	2.8	4.4

=== Minister-President polling ===
Polling firm	Fieldwork date	Sample size					None/Unsure	Lead
Polling firm	Fieldwork date	Sample size	Dreyer SPD	Klöckner CDU	Baldauf CDU	Spiegel Grüne	None/Unsure	Lead
Forschungsgruppe Wahlen	1–4 Mar 2021	998	59	–	28	–	13	31
Infratest dimap	1–3 Mar 2021	1,186	53	–	29	–	18	24
Infratest dimap	19–23 Feb 2021	1,000	56	–	28	–	16	28
Forschungsgruppe Wahlen	1–4 Feb 2021	1,022	59	–	23	–	18	36
Infratest dimap	4–8 Dec 2020	1,002	54	–	18	5	9	36
Infratest dimap	4–8 Sep 2020	1,005	55	–	15	3	11	40
Infratest dimap	27 Feb–3 Mar 2020	1,001	57	–	17	4	11	40
Infratest dimap	5–7 Mar 2018	1,001	56	31	–	–	5	25
Infratest dimap	8–12 Dec 2017	1,003	56	30	–	–	6	26
Infratest dimap	14–19 Jun 2017	1,000	50	31	–	–	9	19
Infratest dimap	2–6 Mar 2017	1,001	52	34	–	–	6	18

=== Preferred coalition ===
Polling firm	Fieldwork date	Sample size	Assessment	SPD Grüne	CDU Grüne	SPD Grüne FDP	CDU Grüne FDP
Forschungsgruppe Wahlen	1–4 Mar 2021	998	Positive	40	31	30	21
Forschungsgruppe Wahlen	1–4 Mar 2021	998	Negative	39	47	45	53
Forschungsgruppe Wahlen	1–4 Feb 2021	1,022	Positive	40	37	30	26
Forschungsgruppe Wahlen	1–4 Feb 2021	1,022	Negative	35	37	45	46

== Results ==
Map of results by constituency (Wahlkreis)

Party	Constituency			Party list				Total seats	+/–
Party	Votes	%	Seats	Votes	%	Swing	Seats	Total seats	+/–
Social Democratic Party of Germany (SPD)	618,176	32.2	28	690,962	35.7	▼0.5	11	39	0
Christian Democratic Union of Germany (CDU)	604,088	31.4	23	535,318	27.7	▼4.1	8	31	▼4
Alliance 90/The Greens (GRÜNE)	210,022	10.9	1	179,860	9.3	▲4.0	9	10	▲4
Alternative for Germany (AfD)	145,383	7.6	0	160,293	8.3	▼4.3	9	9	▼5
Free Democratic Party (FDP)	115,530	6.0	0	106,809	5.5	▼0.7	6	6	▼1
Free Voters (FW)	143,940	7.5	0	103,619	5.4	▲3.2	6	6	▲6
The Left (LINKE)	54,139	2.8	0	48,206	2.5	▼0.3	0	0	0
Human Environment Animal Protection Party	–	–	–	32,527	1.7	New	0	0	New
Die PARTEI	8,402	0.4	0	20,519	1.1	New	0	0	New
Volt Germany	1,497	0.1	0	19,286	1.0	New	0	0	New
Climate List RLP	9,477	0.5	0	13,681	0.7	New	0	0	New
Ecological Democratic Party	8,198	0.4	0	13,406	0.7	▲0.3	0	0	0
Pirate Party Germany	1,820	0.1	0	10,393	0.5	▼0.3	0	0	0
Grassroots Democratic Party of Germany	229	0.0	0	–	–	–	–	0	New
Independents	1,678	0.1	0	–	–	–	–	0	0
Total	1,922,579	100.0	52	1,934,879	100.0	–	49	101	0
Invalid/blank votes	34,770	1.8	–	22,470	1.1	–			
Registered voters/turnout	3,042,414	64.3	–	3,042,414	64.3	▼6.1			
Source: State Returning Officer

Popular vote
SPD	35.71%
CDU	27.67%
GRÜNE	9.30%
AfD	8.28%
FDP	5.52%
FW	5.36%
LINKE	2.49%
Other	5.67%

Landtag seats
SPD	38.61%
CDU	30.69%
GRÜNE	9.90%
AfD	8.91%
FDP	5.94%
FW	5.94%

SPD vote

CDU vote

Green vote

AfD vote

FDP vote

FW vote

== Aftermath ==
The result was considered a victory for the SPD, contrasting a long string of losses in other state, federal, and local elections since 2018. Their success was attributed to the popularity of incumbent Minister-President Dreyer during the COVID-19 pandemic in Germany. After the election, the SPD's federal Chancellor candidate Olaf Scholz voiced his support for a "traffic light" coalition on the federal level.

The CDU's poorer-than-expected result was attributed in part to local factors, such as Dreyer's popularity and the difficulty faced by the opposition when campaigning during pandemic conditions. Commentators also pointed to federal factors, such as the unpopularity of newly-elected federal CDU chairman Armin Laschet, poor management of the pandemic by federal government, and particularly the "mask scandal" which broke a few days before the election. The result was perceived as harming the CDU/CSU's standing ahead of the September federal election, and damaging Laschet's chances of being selected as the Union's candidate for Chancellor.

=== Government formation ===
Minister-President Malu Dreyer quickly voiced her desire to continue the coalition between the SPD, Greens, and Free Democrats. State FDP chairman Volker Wissing made similar comments. The three parties began exploratory talks on 18 March. On 30 April, they announced they had agreed to renew the coalition.

On 18 May, Dreyer was elected as Minister-President for a third term by the Landtag. She won 55 votes, more than the 51 needed for an absolute majority. The new ministry was sworn in the same day, comprising six SPD, two Green, and two FDP ministers.

== See also ==
- 2021 Baden-Württemberg state election
