= Malu Dreyer =

German politician (born 1961)

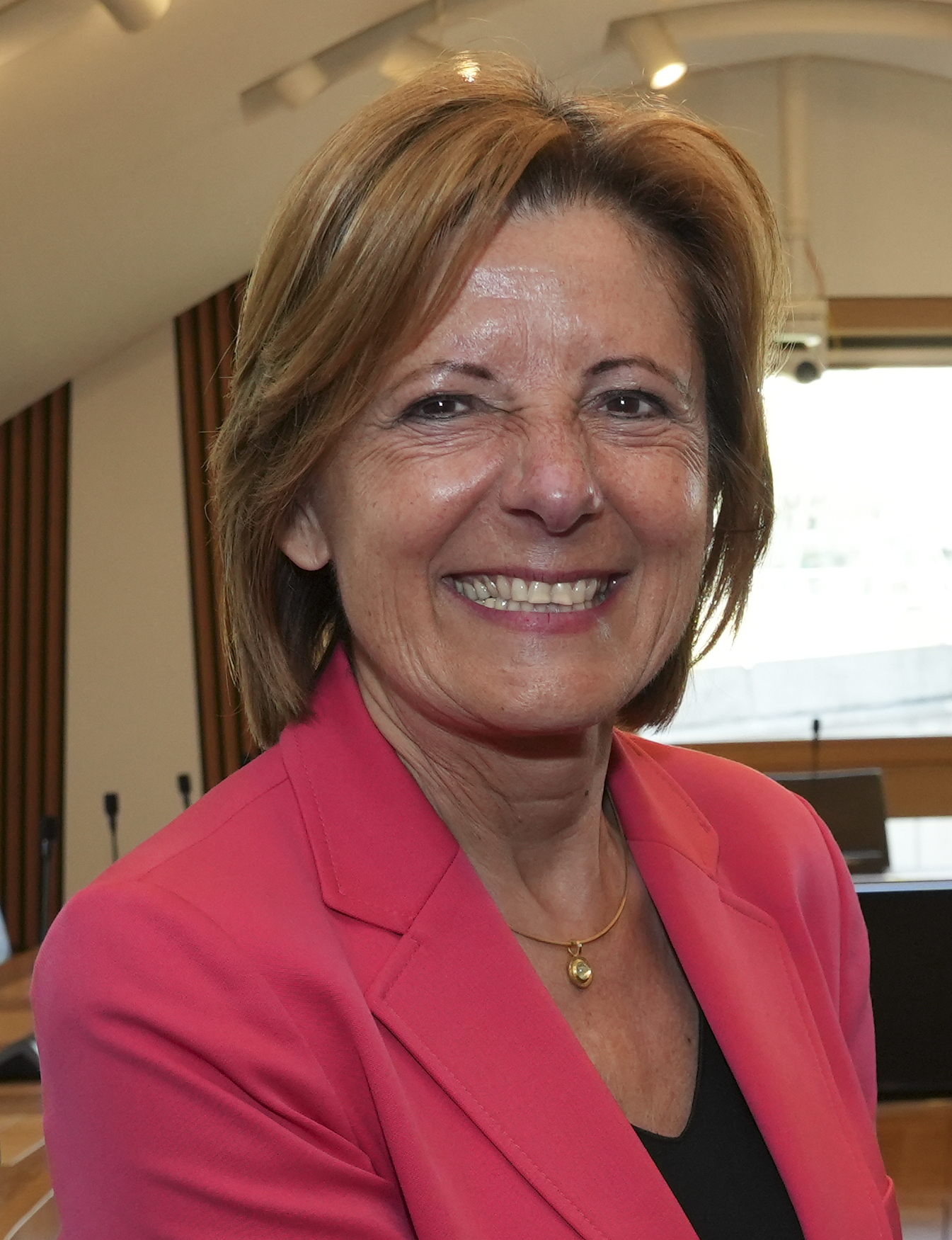
- Dreyer in 2023

Minister-President of Rhineland-Palatinate
- In office 16 January 2013 – 10 July 2024
- Deputy: Eveline Lemke; Volker Wissing; Anne Spiegel; Katharina Binz
- Preceded by: Kurt Beck
- Succeeded by: Alexander Schweitzer

Leader of the Social Democratic Party
- Acting
- In office 3 June 2019 – 6 December 2019 Serving with Thorsten Schäfer-Gümbel, Manuela Schwesig
- General Secretary: Lars Klingbeil
- Preceded by: Andrea Nahles
- Succeeded by: Norbert Walter-Borjans; Saskia Esken

Deputy Leader of the Social Democratic Party
- In office 7 December 2017 – 6 December 2019 Serving with Olaf Scholz, Manuela Schwesig, Ralf Stegner Natascha Kohnen, Thorsten Schäfer-Gümbel
- Leader: Martin Schulz; Andrea Nahles
- Preceded by: Aydan Özoğuz
- Succeeded by: Anke Rehlinger

President of the Bundesrat
- In office 1 November 2016 – 31 October 2017
- First Vice President: Stanislaw Tillich
- Preceded by: Stanislaw Tillich
- Succeeded by: Michael Müller

Minister of Labour, Health and Social Affairs of Rhineland-Palatinate
- In office 15 March 2002 – 15 January 2013
- Minister-President: Kurt Beck
- Preceded by: Florian Gerster
- Succeeded by: Alexander Schweitzer

Member of the Landtag of Rhineland-Palatinate for Trier
- In office 18 May 2006 – 1 August 2016
- Preceded by: Christoph Grimm
- Succeeded by: Sven Teuber

Personal details
- Born: Marie-Luise Dreyer; 6 February 1961 (age 65) Neustadt an der Weinstraße, Rhineland-Palatinate, West Germany
- Party: Social Democratic Party (1995–)
- Spouse: Klaus Jensen
- Education: Johannes Gutenberg University Mainz
- Website: malu-dreyer.de

Marie-Luise "Malu" Dreyer (born 6 February 1961) is a German politician of the Social Democratic Party (SPD) who served as the 8th minister-president of Rhineland-Palatinate from 2013 to 2024. She is the first woman to hold this office. She served a one-year-term as president of the Federal Council from 1 November 2016 – 31 October 2017, which made her deputy to the president of Germany while in office. She was the second female president of the Federal Council and the sixth woman holding one of the five highest federal offices in Germany. On 19 June 2024 she announced her resignation from the office of minister-president with effect from 10 July.

== Early life and education ==
Dreyer was born the second of three children of a principal and a teacher. Following a year as an exchange student at Claremont High School in California in 1977, and her final Abitur exams at the Käthe-Kollwitz-Gymnasium Neustadt in 1980, Dreyer started her English studies and Roman Catholic theology at the University of Mainz. The following year she switched majors to jurisprudence and graduated with the first Staatsexamen in 1987 and the second Staatsexamen three years later with an excellent academic record.

== Career ==
From 1989, Dreyer worked at the University of Mainz as a research assistant to Professor Hans-Joachim Pflug. In 1991 she received her appointment as a probationary judge, and later as a prosecutor in Bad Kreuznach.

=== SPD politician since 1995 ===
Dreyer joined the SPD in 1995 and was mayor of the city of Bad Kreuznach from 1995 to 1997. From 1997 she was head of department for social affairs, youth and housing in the state capital of Mainz. Having served as State Minister of Social Affairs, Labor, Health and Demography since 2002, she was the designated successor of incumbent Minister-president Kurt Beck, who announced his upcoming resignation from the post on 28 September 2012. She was officially elected on 16 January 2013.

As one of Rhineland-Palatinate's representatives at the Bundesrat, Dreyer serves on the Committee on Foreign Affairs and on the Committee on European Union Affairs.

In the negotiations to form a Grand Coalition of Chancellor Angela Merkel's Christian Democrats (CDU together with the Bavarian CSU) and the SPD following the 2013 federal elections, Dreyer was part of the SPD delegation in the working group on cultural and media affairs, led by Michael Kretschmer and Klaus Wowereit.

In the 2016 state elections, Dreyer managed to convert her high personal approval ratings into a 36.2% win against her opponent Julia Klöckner, improving her party's 2011 result by half a percentage point. In electing Dreyer, the electorate voted to keep the SPD in office for their sixth consecutive term.

During her second term in office, Dreyer's government decided to sell the state's 82.5 percent stake in the loss-making Frankfurt–Hahn Airport in western Germany to Chinese conglomerate HNA Group.

In late 2017, SPD members elected Dreyer to the party's national leadership for the first time as a vice chair. In the negotiations to form a fourth coalition government under Merkel following the 2017 federal elections, she led the working group on health policy, alongside Hermann Gröhe and Georg Nüßlein.

Dreyer was nominated by her party as delegate to the Federal Convention for the purpose of electing the President of Germany in 2022.

== Political positions ==
Following the 2017 national elections, Dreyer warned against another grand coalition and favoured a minority government.

== Other activities ==
- ZDF, chairwoman of the Board of Directors, since 2017
- Max Planck Society, member of the Senate
- Central Committee of German Catholics, member
- Deutsches Museum, member of the Board of Trustees
- Friedrich Ebert Foundation (FES), member
- Fritz Walter Foundation, member of the Advisory Board
- Stiftung Mainzer Herz, member of the Board of Trustees
- Stiftung Rheinland-Pfalz für Kultur, chairwoman of the Board of Trustees
- European Foundation for the Speyer Cathedral, member of the Board of Trustees

== Honours ==
- 2023 Grand Cross of the Order of Merit of the Federal Republic of Germany

== Personal life ==
Since 2004, Dreyer has been married to Klaus Jensen, a fellow SPD politician and a former mayor of Trier, who had been widowed three years earlier.

She was diagnosed with multiple sclerosis in 1994. This inhibits her physical movement. She made her illness public in 2006, and, when travelling she now always takes her "Rolli" (wheelchair) along, for covering longer distances.

Political offices
Preceded by Kurt Beck	Minister-president of Rhineland-Palatinate; 2013–2024	Succeeded by Alexander Schweitzer
