= Alexander Schweitzer (politician) =

German politician (born 1973)

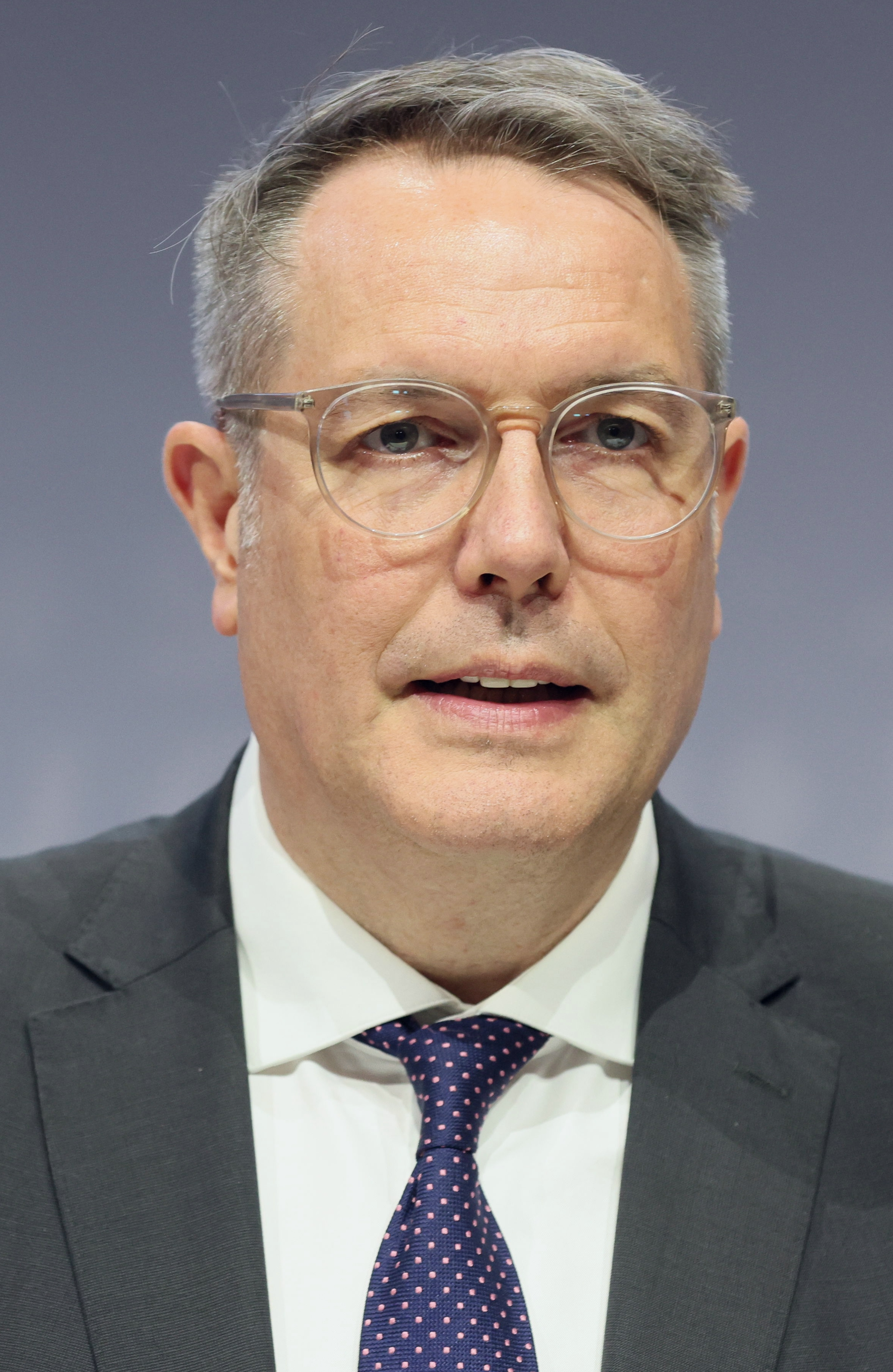
- Schweitzer in 2025

Minister of Labour and Social Affairs
- Incumbent
- Assumed office 13 October 2026
- Chancellor: Friedrich Merz
- Preceded by: Bärbel Bas

Minister-President of Rhineland-Palatinate
- In office 10 July 2024 – 18 May 2026
- President: Malu Dreyer
- Deputy: Katharina Binz
- Preceded by: Malu Dreyer
- Succeeded by: Gordon Schnieder

Minister of Labour, Social Affairs, Transformation and Digitization of Rhineland-Palatinate
- In office 18 May 2021 – 10 July 2024
- Preceded by: Sabine Bätzing-Lichtenthäler
- Succeeded by: Dörte Schall

Member of the Landtag of Rhineland-Palatinate
- In office 26 March 2006 – 15 November 2026
- Succeeded by: Florian Funk

Personal details
- Born: Alexander Roger Schweitzer; 17 September 1973 (age 53) Landau, Rhineland-Palatinate, West Germany
- Party: SPD (since 1989)
- Children: 3
- Education: University of Mainz

Alexander Schweitzer (born 17 September 1973) is a German politician of the Social Democratic Party (SPD) who has been serving as Federal Minister of Labour and Social Affairs in the government of Chancellor Friedrich Merz since October 2026. He is also one of his party's deputy leaders under its chairman Lars Klingbeil.

== Political career ==
=== Career in state politics ===
From 2021 to 2024, Schweitzer served as State Minister for Labor in the government of Minister-President Malu Dreyer of Rhineland-Palatinate. On 10 July 2024, he formed the Schweitzer cabinet and served as the 9th minister-president of Rhineland-Palatinate until 2026.

In the negotiations to form a Grand Coalition under the leadership of Friedrich Merz's Christian Democrats (CDU together with the Bavarian CSU) and the SPD following the 2025 German elections, Schweitzer led the SPD delegation in the working group on economic affairs, industry and tourism; his counterparts from the other parties were Jens Spahn and Hansjörg Durz.

=== Minister of Labour and Social Affairs, 2026–present ===
On 12 October 2026, SPD leader Lars Klingbeil announced that Schweitzer as designated successor of Bärbel Bas as Federal Minister of Labour and Social Affairs. He was formally appointed by President Frank-Walter Steinmeier the next day, serving in the cabinet of Chancellor Friedrich Merz.
