= Neuwied (electoral district) =

Federal electoral district of Germany

196 Neuwied
- Electoral district for the Bundestag
- Neuwied in 2025
- State: Rhineland-Palatinate
- Population: 311,600 (2019)
- Electorate: 236,097 (2025)
- Major settlements: Neuwied; Betzdorf
- Area: 1,269.4 km^{2}

Current electoral district
- Created: 1949
- Party: CDU
- Member: Ellen Demuth
- Elected: 2025

Neuwied is an electoral constituency (German: Wahlkreis) represented in the Bundestag. It elects one member via first-past-the-post voting. Under the current constituency numbering system, it is designated as constituency 196. It is located in northern Rhineland-Palatinate, comprising the districts of Neuwied and Altenkirchen.

Neuwied was created for the inaugural 1949 federal election. Since 2025, it has been represented by Ellen Demuth of the Christian Democratic Union (CDU).

== Geography ==
Neuwied is located in northern Rhineland-Palatinate. As of the 2021 federal election, it comprises the districts of Neuwied and Altenkirchen.

== History ==
Neuwied was created in 1949, then known as Altenkirchen (Westerwald). It acquired its current name in the 1965 election. In the 1949 election, it was Rhineland-Palatinate constituency 1 in the numbering system. In the 1953 through 1976 elections, it was number 148. In the 1980 through 1998 elections, it was number 146. In the 2002 election, it was number 200. In the 2005 election, it was number 199. In the 2009 and 2013 elections, it was number 198. In the 2017 and 2021 elections, it was number 197. From the 2025 election, it has been number 196. Its borders have not changed since its creation.

Election	No.	Name	Borders
1949	1	Altenkirchen (Westerwald)	Altenkirchen district; Neuwied district
1953	148	Altenkirchen (Westerwald)	Altenkirchen district; Neuwied district
1957	148	Altenkirchen (Westerwald)	Altenkirchen district; Neuwied district
1961	148	Altenkirchen (Westerwald)	Altenkirchen district; Neuwied district
1965	148	Neuwied	Altenkirchen district; Neuwied district
1969	148	Neuwied	Altenkirchen district; Neuwied district
1972	148	Neuwied	Altenkirchen district; Neuwied district
1976	148	Neuwied	Altenkirchen district; Neuwied district
1980	146	Neuwied	Altenkirchen district; Neuwied district
1983	146	Neuwied	Altenkirchen district; Neuwied district
1987	146	Neuwied	Altenkirchen district; Neuwied district
1990	146	Neuwied	Altenkirchen district; Neuwied district
1994	146	Neuwied	Altenkirchen district; Neuwied district
1998	146	Neuwied	Altenkirchen district; Neuwied district
2002	200	Neuwied	Altenkirchen district; Neuwied district
2005	199	Neuwied	Altenkirchen district; Neuwied district
2009	198	Neuwied	Altenkirchen district; Neuwied district
2013	198	Neuwied	Altenkirchen district; Neuwied district
2017	197	Neuwied	Altenkirchen district; Neuwied district
2021	197	Neuwied	Altenkirchen district; Neuwied district
2025	196	Neuwied	Altenkirchen district; Neuwied district

== Members ==
The constituency was first represented by Franz-Josef Wuermeling of the Christian Democratic Union (CDU) from 1949 to 1969. He was succeeded by fellow CDU member Walter Hallstein for a single term before the constituency was won by Klaus Immer of the Social Democratic Party (SPD). Heinz Schwarz regained it for the CDU after one term in 1976, and was representative until 1990. Ulrich Schmalz of the CDU served from 1990 to 1998. Ludwig Eich of the SPD was elected in 1998 and served a single term before being succeeded by fellow SPD member Sabine Bätzing until 2005. Erwin Rüddel of the CDU was elected in 2009, and re-elected in 2013, 2017, and 2021. Ellen Demuth retained the seat for the CDU in 2025.

Election	Member	Party	%
1949	Franz-Josef Wuermeling	CDU	53.6
1953	Franz-Josef Wuermeling	CDU	56.2
1957	Franz-Josef Wuermeling	CDU	57.6
1961	Franz-Josef Wuermeling	CDU	53.1
1965	Franz-Josef Wuermeling	CDU	54.3
1969	Walter Hallstein	CDU	51.2
1972	Klaus Immer	SPD	46.9
1976	Heinz Schwarz	CDU	50.4
1980	Heinz Schwarz	CDU	46.7
1983	Heinz Schwarz	CDU	53.7
1987	Heinz Schwarz	CDU	49.0
1990	Ulrich Schmalz	CDU	47.8
1994	Ulrich Schmalz	CDU	46.9
1998	Ludwig Eich	SPD	45.5
2002	Sabine Bätzing	SPD	44.9
2005	Sabine Bätzing	SPD	44.3
2009	Erwin Rüddel	CDU	39.2
2013	Erwin Rüddel	CDU	46.9
2017	Erwin Rüddel	CDU	43.2
2021	Erwin Rüddel	CDU	31.9
2025	Ellen Demuth	CDU	35.6

== Election results ==
=== 2025 election ===
Federal election (2025): Neuwied
Notes:	Blue background denotes the winner of the electorate vote. Pink background denotes a candidate elected from their party list. Yellow background denotes an electorate win by a list member, or other incumbent. A ✓ or ✗ denotes status of any incumbent, win or lose respectively.						
Party	Candidate	Votes	%	±%	Party votes	%	±%
CDU	Ellen Demuth	68,501	35.6	▲3.7	62,297	32.3	▲5.5
AfD	Andreas Bleck	40,363	21.0	▲11.6	41,996	21.7	▲12.0
SPD	Jan Hellinghausen	42,315	22.0	▼8.2	35,679	18.5	▼11.5
Greens	Thorben Thieme	11,919	6.2	▼3.0	15,674	8.1	▼2.4
Left	Julia Eudenbach	9,691	5.0	▲2.3	11,694	6.1	▲3.1
BSW	Nalan Özcan	6,443	3.3	New	8,986	4.7	New
FDP	Sandra Weeser	6,858	3.6	▼5.3	8,488	4.4	▼7.1
FW	Carsten Zeuch	4,345	2.3	▼2.2	3,234	1.7	▼1.6
Tierschutzpartei					2,373	1.2	▼0.2
Volt	René Krämer	1,955	1.0	New	1,178	0.6	▲0.3
PARTEI					911	0.5	▼0.5
BD					299	0.2	New
ÖDP					239	0.1	0.0
MLPD					52	<0.1	0.0
Informal votes		1,937			1,227		
Total valid votes		192,390			193,100		
Turnout		194,327	82.3	▲5.9			
CDU hold	Majority	26,186	13.6	▲11.9			

=== 2021 election ===
Federal election (2021): Neuwied
Notes:	Blue background denotes the winner of the electorate vote. Pink background denotes a candidate elected from their party list. Yellow background denotes an electorate win by a list member, or other incumbent. A ✓ or ✗ denotes status of any incumbent, win or lose respectively.						
Party	Candidate	Votes	%	±%	Party votes	%	±%
CDU	✓ Erwin Rüddel	57,430	31.9	▼11.2	48,338	26.8	▼11.4
SPD	Martin Diedenhofen	54,320	30.2	▲1.6	54,018	30.0	▲4.6
AfD	Andreas Bleck	16,810	9.4	▼0.2	17,504	9.7	▼1.1
Greens	Kevin Lenz	16,559	9.2	▲3.9	18,930	10.5	▲4.5
FDP	Sandra Weeser	15,931	8.9	▲2.7	20,751	11.5	▲1.4
FW	Marianne Altgeld	8,032	4.5	▲2.6	5,860	3.3	▲2.1
Left	Jochen Bülow	5,005	2.8	▼2.6	5,417	3.0	▼3.3
Tierschutzpartei					2,546	1.4	
PARTEI	Christian Link	2,776	1.5		1,746	1.0	▲0.1
dieBasis	Klaus Asbach	2,177	1.2		2,286	1.3	
Team Todenhöfer					692	0.4	
Pirates					701	0.4	0.0
Independent	Norbert Schmitt	545	0.3				
Volt					540	0.3	
ÖDP					245	0.1	▼0.1
NPD					214	0.1	▼0.1
Independent	Markus Erdmann	194	0.1				
Humanists					153	0.1	
V-Partei3					152	0.1	▼0.1
DiB					99	0.1	
LKR					70	0.0	
MLPD					31	0.0	0.0
Informal votes		2,058			1,544		
Total valid votes		179,779			180,293		
Turnout		181,837	76.4	▲0.5			
CDU hold	Majority	3,110	1.7	▼12.8			

=== 2017 election ===
Federal election (2017): Neuwied
Notes:	Blue background denotes the winner of the electorate vote. Pink background denotes a candidate elected from their party list. Yellow background denotes an electorate win by a list member, or other incumbent. A ✓ or ✗ denotes status of any incumbent, win or lose respectively.						
Party	Candidate	Votes	%	±%	Party votes	%	±%
CDU	✓ Erwin Rüddel	76,933	43.2	▼3.7	68,357	38.2	▼7.4
SPD	Martin Diedenhofen	50,996	28.6	▼8.6	45,447	25.4	▼3.2
AfD	Andreas Bleck	16,954	9.5		19,273	10.8	▲5.6
FDP	Sandra Weeser	10,898	6.1	▲3.8	18,071	10.1	▲5.4
Left	Jochen Bülow	9,521	5.3	▲0.8	11,338	6.3	▲1.1
Greens	Anna Neuhof	9,449	5.3	▲1.3	10,738	6.0	▼0.2
FW	Sascha Müller	3,285	1.8	0.0	1,982	1.1	▲0.1
PARTEI					1,495	0.8	
Pirates					726	0.4	▼1.5
NPD					480	0.3	▼0.7
V-Partei³					396	0.2	
ÖDP					374	0.2	0.0
BGE					297	0.2	
MLPD	Johann-Albrecht Rommel	169	0.1		86	0.0	0.0
Informal votes		3,402			2,547		
Total valid votes		178,205			179,060		
Turnout		181,607	75.9	▲3.7			
CDU hold	Majority	25,937	14.6	▲5.0			

=== 2013 election ===
Federal election (2013): Neuwied
Notes:	Blue background denotes the winner of the electorate vote. Pink background denotes a candidate elected from their party list. Yellow background denotes an electorate win by a list member, or other incumbent. A ✓ or ✗ denotes status of any incumbent, win or lose respectively.						
Party	Candidate	Votes	%	±%	Party votes	%	±%
CDU	✓ Erwin Rüddel	79,785	46.9	▲7.7	78,005	45.6	▲9.5
SPD	Sabine Bätzing-Lichtenthäler	63,453	37.3	▲0.8	48,866	28.6	▲3.7
Left	Jochen Bülow	7,655	4.5	▼2.2	8,965	5.2	▼3.8
Greens	Elisabeth Bröskamp	6,779	4.0	▼1.7	10,661	6.2	▼2.0
AfD					8,759	5.1	
FDP	Sandra Weeser	3,906	2.3	▼8.3	8,023	4.7	▼12.2
Pirates	Peter König	3,418	2.0		3,249	1.9	▲0.3
FW	Oliver Weihrauch	3,114	1.8		1,657	1.0	
NPD	Uwe Weber	2,179	1.3	▼0.2	1,610	0.9	▼0.1
PRO					355	0.2	
Party of Reason					354	0.2	
ÖDP					322	0.2	0.0
REP					262	0.2	▼0.3
MLPD					68	0.0	0.0
Informal votes		3,247			2,380		
Total valid votes		170,289			171,156		
Turnout		173,536	72.2	▲1.0			
CDU hold	Majority	16,332	9.6	▲6.8			

=== 2009 election ===
Federal election (2009): Neuwied
Notes:	Blue background denotes the winner of the electorate vote. Pink background denotes a candidate elected from their party list. Yellow background denotes an electorate win by a list member, or other incumbent. A ✓ or ✗ denotes status of any incumbent, win or lose respectively.						
Party	Candidate	Votes	%	±%	Party votes	%	±%
CDU	Erwin Rüddel	66,214	39.2	▼4.3	61,307	36.0	▼2.6
SPD	✗ Sabine Bätzing	61,544	36.4	▼7.8	42,279	24.9	▼10.9
FDP	Elke Hoff	17,881	10.6	▲6.6	28,754	16.9	▲5.7
Left	Olcay Kanmaz	11,331	6.7	▲2.8	15,360	9.0	▲3.9
Greens	Hildegard Lingnau	9,518	5.6	▲3.3	14,005	8.2	▲2.1
Pirates					2,758	1.6	
NPD	Christian Bieler	2,438	1.4	▲0.4	1,820	1.1	▲0.1
FAMILIE					1,548	0.9	0.0
PBC					1,022	0.6	▼0.2
REP					689	0.4	0.0
ÖDP					327	0.2	
DVU					123	0.1	
MLPD					72	0.0	0.0
Informal votes		3,873			2,735		
Total valid votes		168,926			170,064		
Turnout		172,799	71.2	▼7.2			
CDU gain from SPD	Majority	4,670	2.8				

=== 2005 election ===
Federal election (2005):Neuwied
Notes:	Blue background denotes the winner of the electorate vote. Pink background denotes a candidate elected from their party list. Yellow background denotes an electorate win by a list member, or other incumbent. A ✓ or ✗ denotes status of any incumbent, win or lose respectively.						
Party	Candidate	Votes	%	±%	Party votes	%	±%
SPD	✓ Sabine Bätzing	82,753	44.3	▼0.6	66,828	35.8	▼2.8
CDU	Werner Wittlich	81,308	43.5	▼0.8	72,203	38.6	▼3.1
FDP	Elke Hoff	7,492	4.0	▼1.9	20,866	11.2	▲2.1
Left	Gert Winkelmeier	7,276	3.9	▲2.9	9,514	5.1	▲4.1
Greens	Hildegard Lingnau	4,324	2.3	▼0.7	11,492	6.1	▼0.9
NPD	Christian Greeb	2,042	1.1		1,842	1.0	▲0.7
PBC	Werner Ginsberg	1,750	0.9	▲0.1	1,532	0.8	▲0.2
Familie					1,689	0.9	
REP					786	0.4	0.0
MLPD					128	0.1	
Informal votes		3,365			3,430		
Total valid votes		186,945			186,880		
Turnout		190,310	78.4	▼1.5			
SPD hold	Majority	1,445	0.8				
