= Ellen Demuth =

German politician (born 1982)

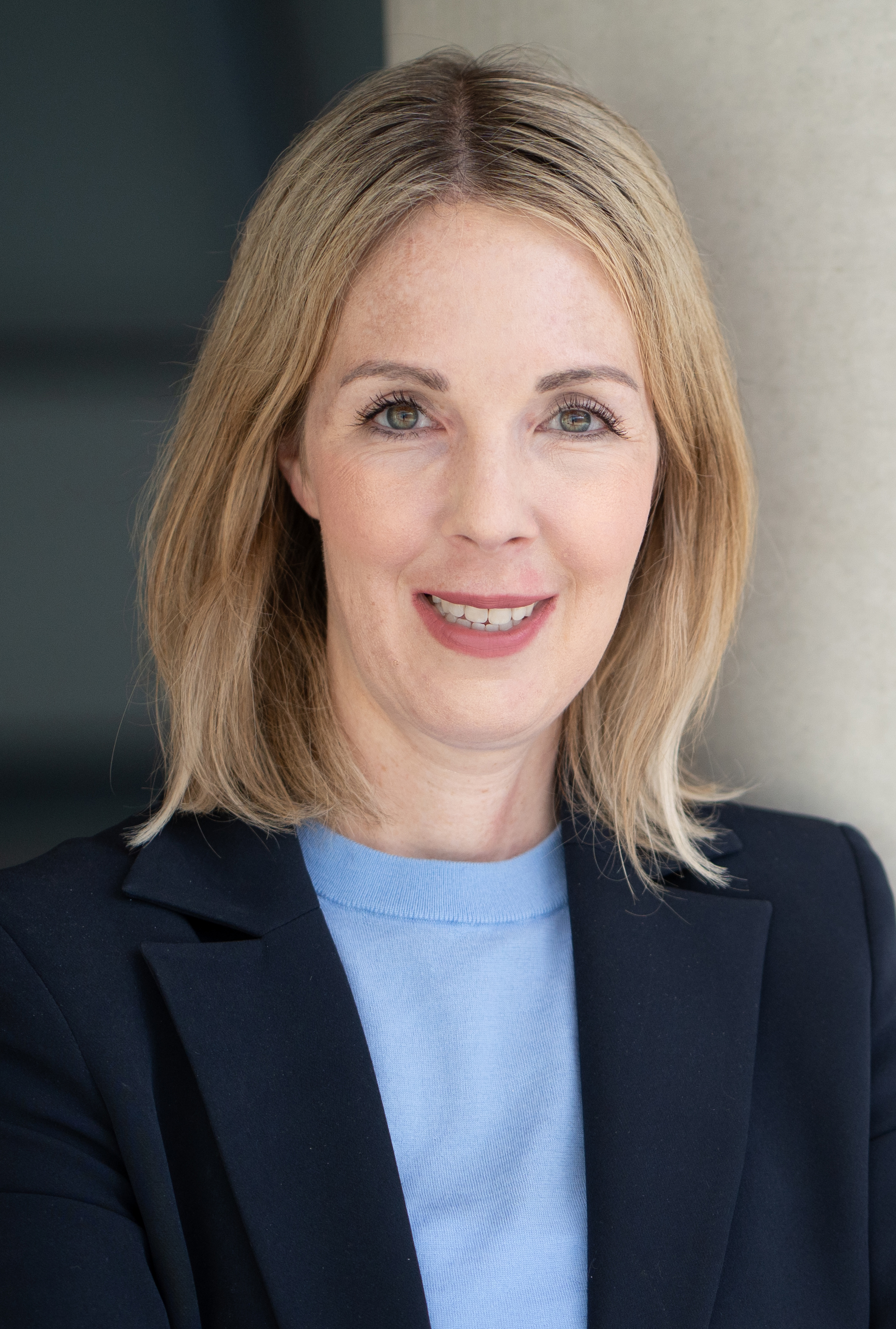
- Demuth 2025

Member of the Bundestag
- Assuming office 23 February 2025
- Succeeding: Erwin Rüddel
- Constituency: Neuwied

Member of the Landtag of Rhineland-Palatinate
- In office 18 May 2011 – 4 April 2025
- Succeeded by: Pierre Fischer

Personal details
- Born: 10 July 1982 (age 44) Linz am Rhein, West Germany (now Germany)
- Party: Christian Democratic Union (since 2001)
- Education: IU International University of Applied Sciences; Melbourne Institute of Technology

Ellen Demuth (born 10 July 1982) is a German politician of the Christian Democratic Union (CDU) who has been serving as a member of the Bundestag since the 2025 elections, representing the Neuwied district.

== Political career ==
From 2011 to 2025, Demuth was a member of the State Parliament of Rhineland-Palatinate.

Ahead of the CDU's January 2021 leadership election, Demuth was part of candidate Norbert Röttgen's campaign team.

From 2022 to 2024, Demuth served as deputy state chair of the CDU in Rhineland-Palatinate, under the leadership of Christian Baldauf.

In parliament, Demuth has been a full member of the Committee on Foreign Affairs, the Committee on Education, Family Affairs, Senior Citizens, Women and Youth, and the Committee on Culture and Media. She has also been serving as deputy chair of the Subcommittee on Foreign Cultural and Education Policy.
