= Kreuznach (electoral district) =

Federal electoral district of Germany

200 Kreuznach
- Electoral district for the Bundestag
- Kreuznach in 2025
- State: Rhineland-Palatinate
- Population: 239,300 (2019)
- Electorate: 179,528 (2025)
- Major settlements: Bad Kreuznach; Idar-Oberstein; Kirn
- Area: 1,640.7 km^{2}

Current electoral district
- Created: 1949
- Party: CDU
- Member: Julia Klöckner
- Elected: 2025

Kreuznach is an electoral constituency (German: Wahlkreis) represented in the Bundestag. It elects one member via first-past-the-post voting. Under the current constituency numbering system, it is designated as constituency 200. It is located in central Rhineland-Palatinate, comprising the districts of Bad Kreuznach and Birkenfeld.

Kreuznach was created for the inaugural 1949 federal election. Since 2025, it has been represented by Julia Klöckner of the Christian Democratic Union of Germany (CDU).

== Geography ==
Kreuznach is located in central Rhineland-Palatinate. As of the 2021 federal election, it comprises the districts of Bad Kreuznach and Birkenfeld.

== History ==
Kreuznach was created in 1949. In the 1949 election, it was Rhineland-Palatinate constituency 5 in the numbering system. In the 1953 through 1976 elections, it was number 152. In the 1980 through 1998 elections, it was number 150. In the 2002 election, it was number 204. In the 2005 election, it was number 203. In the 2009 and 2013 elections, it was number 202. In the 2017 and 2021 elections, it was number 201. From the 2025 election, it has been number 200. Its borders have not changed since its creation.

| Election | No. | Name | Borders |
|---|---|---|---|
| 1949 | 5 | Kreuznach | Bad Kreuznach district; Birkenfeld district |
| 1953 | 152 | Kreuznach | Bad Kreuznach district; Birkenfeld district |
| 1957 | 152 | Kreuznach | Bad Kreuznach district; Birkenfeld district |
| 1961 | 152 | Kreuznach | Bad Kreuznach district; Birkenfeld district |
| 1965 | 152 | Kreuznach | Bad Kreuznach district; Birkenfeld district |
| 1969 | 152 | Kreuznach | Bad Kreuznach district; Birkenfeld district |
| 1972 | 152 | Kreuznach | Bad Kreuznach district; Birkenfeld district |
| 1976 | 152 | Kreuznach | Bad Kreuznach district; Birkenfeld district |
| 1980 | 150 | Kreuznach | Bad Kreuznach district; Birkenfeld district |
| 1983 | 150 | Kreuznach | Bad Kreuznach district; Birkenfeld district |
| 1987 | 150 | Kreuznach | Bad Kreuznach district; Birkenfeld district |
| 1990 | 150 | Kreuznach | Bad Kreuznach district; Birkenfeld district |
| 1994 | 150 | Kreuznach | Bad Kreuznach district; Birkenfeld district |
| 1998 | 150 | Kreuznach | Bad Kreuznach district; Birkenfeld district |
| 2002 | 204 | Kreuznach | Bad Kreuznach district; Birkenfeld district |
| 2005 | 203 | Kreuznach | Bad Kreuznach district; Birkenfeld district |
| 2009 | 202 | Kreuznach | Bad Kreuznach district; Birkenfeld district |
| 2013 | 202 | Kreuznach | Bad Kreuznach district; Birkenfeld district |
| 2017 | 201 | Kreuznach | Bad Kreuznach district; Birkenfeld district |
| 2021 | 201 | Kreuznach | Bad Kreuznach district; Birkenfeld district |
| 2025 | 200 | Kreuznach | Bad Kreuznach district; Birkenfeld district |

== Members ==
The constituency was first represented by Hugo Mayer of the Christian Democratic Union (CDU) from 1949 to 1957. Wilhelm Dröscher of the Social Democratic Party (SPD) was elected in 1957 and served until 1972. He was succeeded by fellow SPD member Conrad Ahlers until 1980. Günther Leonhart, also of the SPD, then served from 1980 to 1990. Fritz Rudolf Körper retained the constituency for the SPD in the 1990 election, and was representative until 2005. Julia Klöckner won it for the CDU in 2005 and was re-elected in 2009. Antje Lezius of the CDU was elected in 2013 and re-elected in 2017. Joe Weingarten won the constituency for the SPD in 2021, but lost to Julia Klöckner of the CDU in 2025.

| Election | Member | Party | % |
|---|---|---|---|
| 1949 | Hugo Mayer | CDU | 34.3 |
| 1953 | Hugo Mayer | CDU | 41.2 |
| 1957 | Wilhelm Dröscher | SPD | 38.3 |
| 1961 | Wilhelm Dröscher | SPD | 44.0 |
| 1965 | Wilhelm Dröscher | SPD | 51.9 |
| 1969 | Wilhelm Dröscher | SPD | 51.0 |
| 1972 | Conrad Ahlers | SPD | 52.5 |
| 1976 | Conrad Ahlers | SPD | 44.9 |
| 1980 | Günther Leonhart | SPD | 47.1 |
| 1983 | Günther Leonhart | SPD | 46.9 |
| 1987 | Günther Leonhart | SPD | 46.3 |
| 1990 | Fritz Rudolf Körper | SPD | 45.2 |
| 1994 | Fritz Rudolf Körper | SPD | 44.8 |
| 1998 | Fritz Rudolf Körper | SPD | 47.0 |
| 2002 | Fritz Rudolf Körper | SPD | 47.1 |
| 2005 | Julia Klöckner | CDU | 43.0 |
| 2009 | Julia Klöckner | CDU | 47.0 |
| 2013 | Antje Lezius | CDU | 41.4 |
| 2017 | Antje Lezius | CDU | 37.0 |
| 2021 | Joe Weingarten | SPD | 33.0 |
| 2025 | Julia Klöckner | CDU | 32.3 |

== Election results ==
=== 2025 election ===
Federal election (2025): Kreuznach
| Notes: | Blue background denotes the winner of the electorate vote. Pink background denotes a candidate elected from their party list. Yellow background denotes an electorate win by a list member, or other incumbent. A ✓ or ✗ denotes status of any incumbent, win or lose respectively. | | | | | | |
| Party | Candidate | Votes | % | ±% | Party votes | % | ±% |
|---|---|---|---|---|---|---|---|
| CDU | Julia Klöckner | 46,766 | 32.3 | ▲3.2 | 44,074 | 30.3 | ▲5.8 |
| AfD | Nicole Höchst | 30,689 | 21.2 | ▲11.6 | 32,452 | 22.3 | ▲12.4 |
| SPD | ✗ Joe Weingarten | 38,085 | 26.3 | ▼6.8 | 29,494 | 20.3 | ▼12.1 |
| Greens | Regine Kircher-Kumbrink | 7,764 | 5.4 | ▼2.0 | 11,570 | 8.0 | ▼1.5 |
| Left | Jürgen Locher | 6,352 | 4.4 | ▲1.2 | 8,583 | 5.9 | ▲2.6 |
| FDP | Patrick Bruns | 4,714 | 3.3 | ▼3.9 | 6,425 | 4.4 | ▼7.1 |
| BSW | Bianca Steimle | 4,719 | 3.3 | New | 6,254 | 4.3 | New |
| FW | Christian Schöpfer | 4,407 | 3.0 | ▼2.6 | 2,712 | 1.9 | ▼1.5 |
| Tierschutzpartei | | | | | 1,816 | 1.2 | ▼0.3 |
| Volt | Kerstin Mikolajewski | 1,441 | 1.0 | ▲0.4 | 998 | 0.7 | ▲0.2 |
| PARTEI | | | | | 621 | 0.4 | ▼0.4 |
| ÖDP | | | | | 202 | 0.1 | ▼0.3 |
| BD | | | | | 181 | 0.1 | New |
| MLPD | | | | | 69 | <0.1 | 0.0 |
| Informal votes | | 1,505 | | | 991 | | |
| Total valid votes | | 144,937 | | | 145,451 | | |
| Turnout | | 146,442 | 81.6 | ▲5.8 | | | |
| CDU gain from SPD | Majority | 8,681 | 6.0 | N/A | | | |

=== 2021 election ===
Federal election (2021): Kreuznach
| Notes: | Blue background denotes the winner of the electorate vote. Pink background denotes a candidate elected from their party list. Yellow background denotes an electorate win by a list member, or other incumbent. A ✓ or ✗ denotes status of any incumbent, win or lose respectively. | | | | | | |
| Party | Candidate | Votes | % | ±% | Party votes | % | ±% |
|---|---|---|---|---|---|---|---|
| SPD | Joe Weingarten | 44,976 | 33.0 | ▲1.6 | 44,259 | 32.4 | ▲5.0 |
| CDU | Julia Klöckner | 39,589 | 29.1 | ▼7.9 | 33,433 | 24.5 | ▼9.7 |
| AfD | Nicole Höchst | 12,972 | 9.5 | ▼1.3 | 13,510 | 9.9 | ▼1.8 |
| Greens | Christoph Benze | 9,958 | 7.3 | ▲2.4 | 12,903 | 9.4 | ▲3.2 |
| FDP | Marvin Griesbach | 9,753 | 7.2 | ▲0.4 | 15,704 | 11.5 | ▲1.6 |
| FW | Rouven Hebel | 7,648 | 5.6 | ▲3.0 | 4,616 | 3.4 | ▲2.0 |
| Left | Bianca Steimle | 4,294 | 3.2 | ▼2.4 | 4,454 | 3.3 | ▼3.6 |
| Tierschutzpartei | | | | | 2,054 | 1.5 | |
| dieBasis | Stefan Viehl | 1,997 | 1.5 | | 1,930 | 1.4 | |
| PARTEI | Fabian Krug | 1,837 | 1.3 | | 1,182 | 0.9 | ▼0.1 |
| ÖDP | Eva Eisenhardt-Borsche | 1,718 | 1.3 | ▲0.4 | 537 | 0.4 | 0.0 |
| Volt | Ron-David Röder | 771 | 0.6 | | 608 | 0.4 | |
| Pirates | | | | | 497 | 0.4 | 0.0 |
| Independent | Doris Vollmer | 362 | 0.3 | | | | |
| Team Todenhöfer | | | | | 339 | 0.2 | |
| NPD | | | | | 178 | 0.1 | ▼0.1 |
| Humanists | | | | | 115 | 0.1 | |
| V-Partei3 | | | | | 112 | 0.1 | ▼0.1 |
| LKR | Stephan Schlitz | 226 | 0.2 | | 105 | 0.1 | |
| DiB | | | | | 92 | 0.1 | |
| MLPD | | | | | 30 | 0.0 | 0.0 |
| Informal votes | | 2,008 | | | 1,451 | | |
| Total valid votes | | 136,101 | | | 136,658 | | |
| Turnout | | 138,109 | 75.7 | ▲0.2 | | | |
| SPD gain from CDU | Majority | 5,387 | 3.9 | | | | |

=== 2017 election ===
Federal election (2017): Kreuznach
| Notes: | Blue background denotes the winner of the electorate vote. Pink background denotes a candidate elected from their party list. Yellow background denotes an electorate win by a list member, or other incumbent. A ✓ or ✗ denotes status of any incumbent, win or lose respectively. | | | | | | |
| Party | Candidate | Votes | % | ±% | Party votes | % | ±% |
|---|---|---|---|---|---|---|---|
| CDU | ✓ Antje Lezius | 50,975 | 37.0 | ▼4.4 | 47,189 | 34.1 | ▼6.9 |
| SPD | Joe Weingarten (Note: Weingarten entered the Bundestag on the SPD list after the resignation of Andrea Nahles in November 2019.) | 43,373 | 31.5 | ▼6.2 | 37,906 | 27.4 | ▼3.9 |
| AfD | Nicole Höchst | 14,914 | 10.8 | | 16,198 | 11.7 | ▲7.0 |
| FDP | Lothar Ackermann | 9,342 | 6.8 | ▲3.9 | 13,654 | 9.9 | ▲4.3 |
| Left | Manuela Holz | 7,610 | 5.5 | ▲0.3 | 9,493 | 6.9 | ▲1.1 |
| Greens | Christiane Wayand | 6,750 | 4.9 | ▼0.5 | 8,629 | 6.2 | ▼0.1 |
| FW | Herbert Drumm | 3,629 | 2.6 | ▼1.4 | 1,910 | 1.4 | 0.0 |
| PARTEI | | | | | 1,316 | 1.0 | |
| ÖDP | Leander Hahn | 1,201 | 0.9 | | 492 | 0.4 | ▲0.2 |
| Pirates | | | | | 487 | 0.4 | ▼1.5 |
| NPD | | | | | 366 | 0.3 | ▼0.8 |
| V-Partei³ | | | | | 318 | 0.2 | |
| BGE | | | | | 222 | 0.2 | |
| MLPD | | | | | 31 | 0.0 | 0.0 |
| Informal votes | | 2,114 | | | 1,697 | | |
| Total valid votes | | 137,794 | | | 138,211 | | |
| Turnout | | 139,908 | 75.6 | ▲5.0 | | | |
| CDU hold | Majority | 7,602 | 5.5 | ▲1.7 | | | |

=== 2013 election ===
Federal election (2013): Kreuznach
| Notes: | Blue background denotes the winner of the electorate vote. Pink background denotes a candidate elected from their party list. Yellow background denotes an electorate win by a list member, or other incumbent. A ✓ or ✗ denotes status of any incumbent, win or lose respectively. | | | | | | |
| Party | Candidate | Votes | % | ±% | Party votes | % | ±% |
|---|---|---|---|---|---|---|---|
| CDU | Antje Lezius | 53,324 | 41.4 | ▼5.6 | 53,335 | 41.1 | ▲8.0 |
| SPD | Fritz Rudolf Körper | 48,521 | 37.6 | ▲9.0 | 40,708 | 31.4 | ▲4.6 |
| Left | Wolfgang Kleudgen | 6,688 | 5.2 | ▼3.7 | 7,485 | 5.8 | ▼5.1 |
| Greens | Stefan Boxler | 5,733 | 4.4 | ▼2.3 | 8,221 | 6.3 | ▼2.1 |
| FW | Bernhard Alscher | 5,194 | 4.0 | | 1,745 | 1.3 | |
| FDP | Klaus-Jürgen Friedrich | 3,767 | 2.9 | ▼3.8 | 7,236 | 5.6 | ▼10.6 |
| AfD | | | | | 6,180 | 4.8 | |
| Pirates | Claudia Frick | 2,996 | 2.3 | | 2,394 | 1.8 | ▲0.3 |
| NPD | Markus Walter | 1,772 | 1.4 | 0.0 | 1,434 | 1.1 | ▼0.1 |
| Independent | Franz Jansen | 895 | 0.7 | | | | |
| PRO | | | | | 288 | 0.2 | |
| Party of Reason | | | | | 283 | 0.2 | |
| ÖDP | | | | | 253 | 0.2 | 0.0 |
| REP | | | | | 210 | 0.2 | ▼0.3 |
| MLPD | | | | | 32 | 0.0 | 0.0 |
| Informal votes | | 3,409 | | | 2,495 | | |
| Total valid votes | | 128,890 | | | 129,804 | | |
| Turnout | | 132,299 | 70.6 | ▲0.7 | | | |
| CDU hold | Majority | 4,803 | 3.8 | ▼14.5 | | | |

=== 2009 election ===
Federal election (2009): Kreuznach
| Notes: | Blue background denotes the winner of the electorate vote. Pink background denotes a candidate elected from their party list. Yellow background denotes an electorate win by a list member, or other incumbent. A ✓ or ✗ denotes status of any incumbent, win or lose respectively. | | | | | | |
| Party | Candidate | Votes | % | ±% | Party votes | % | ±% |
|---|---|---|---|---|---|---|---|
| CDU | ✓ Julia Klöckner | 61,167 | 47.0 | ▲4.0 | 43,300 | 33.1 | ▼0.5 |
| SPD | Fritz Rudolf Körper | 37,332 | 28.7 | ▼13.0 | 34,984 | 26.8 | ▼11.8 |
| Left | Tanja Krauth | 11,579 | 8.9 | ▲4.2 | 14,197 | 10.9 | ▲4.9 |
| Greens | Stephanie Otto | 8,768 | 6.7 | ▲2.9 | 11,065 | 8.5 | ▲1.9 |
| FDP | Walter Jung | 8,684 | 6.7 | ▲2.1 | 21,190 | 16.2 | ▲4.4 |
| Pirates | | | | | 2,030 | 1.6 | |
| NPD | Holger Deubel | 1,798 | 1.4 | ▼0.2 | 1,560 | 1.2 | ▼0.3 |
| FAMILIE | | | | | 1,158 | 0.9 | ▼0.1 |
| Independent | Franz Jansen | 801 | 0.6 | | | | |
| REP | | | | | 547 | 0.4 | ▼0.2 |
| ÖDP | | | | | 260 | 0.2 | |
| PBC | | | | | 248 | 0.2 | ▼0.1 |
| DVU | | | | | 158 | 0.1 | |
| MLPD | | | | | 36 | 0.0 | 0.0 |
| Informal votes | | 3,062 | | | 2,458 | | |
| Total valid votes | | 130,129 | | | 130,733 | | |
| Turnout | | 133,191 | 69.9 | ▼7.1 | | | |
| CDU hold | Majority | 23,835 | 18.3 | ▲17.0 | | | |

=== 2005 election ===
Federal election (2005):Kreuznach
| Notes: | Blue background denotes the winner of the electorate vote. Pink background denotes a candidate elected from their party list. Yellow background denotes an electorate win by a list member, or other incumbent. A ✓ or ✗ denotes status of any incumbent, win or lose respectively. | | | | | | |
| Party | Candidate | Votes | % | ±% | Party votes | % | ±% |
|---|---|---|---|---|---|---|---|
| CDU | Julia Klöckner | 62,007 | 43.0 | ▲2.9 | 48,629 | 33.6 | ▼2.8 |
| SPD | ✗ Fritz-Rudolf Körper | 60,167 | 41.7 | ▼5.3 | 55,731 | 38.6 | ▼3.8 |
| Left | Harald Steinkopf | 6,734 | 4.7 | ▲3.2 | 8,663 | 6.0 | ▲4.9 |
| FDP | Daniela Faller | 6,531 | 4.5 | ▼2.5 | 17,107 | 11.8 | ▲1.7 |
| Greens | Ludger Nuphaus | 5,603 | 3.9 | 0.0 | 9,426 | 6.5 | ▼0.6 |
| NPD | Reinhold Seiss | 2,332 | 1.6 | | 2,150 | 1.5 | ▲1.1 |
| Familie | | | | | 1,480 | 1.0 | |
| REP | | | | | 877 | 0.6 | ▼0.3 |
| Independent | Franz Jansen | 837 | 0.6 | | | | |
| PBC | | | | | 451 | 0.3 | ▲0.1 |
| MLPD | | | | | 80 | 0.1 | |
| Informal votes | | 3,522 | | | 3,139 | | |
| Total valid votes | | 144,211 | | | 144,594 | | |
| Turnout | | 147,733 | 77.0 | ▼0.9 | | | |
| CDU gain from SPD | Majority | 1,840 | 1.3 | | | | |
