= Julia Klöckner =

German politician (born 1972)

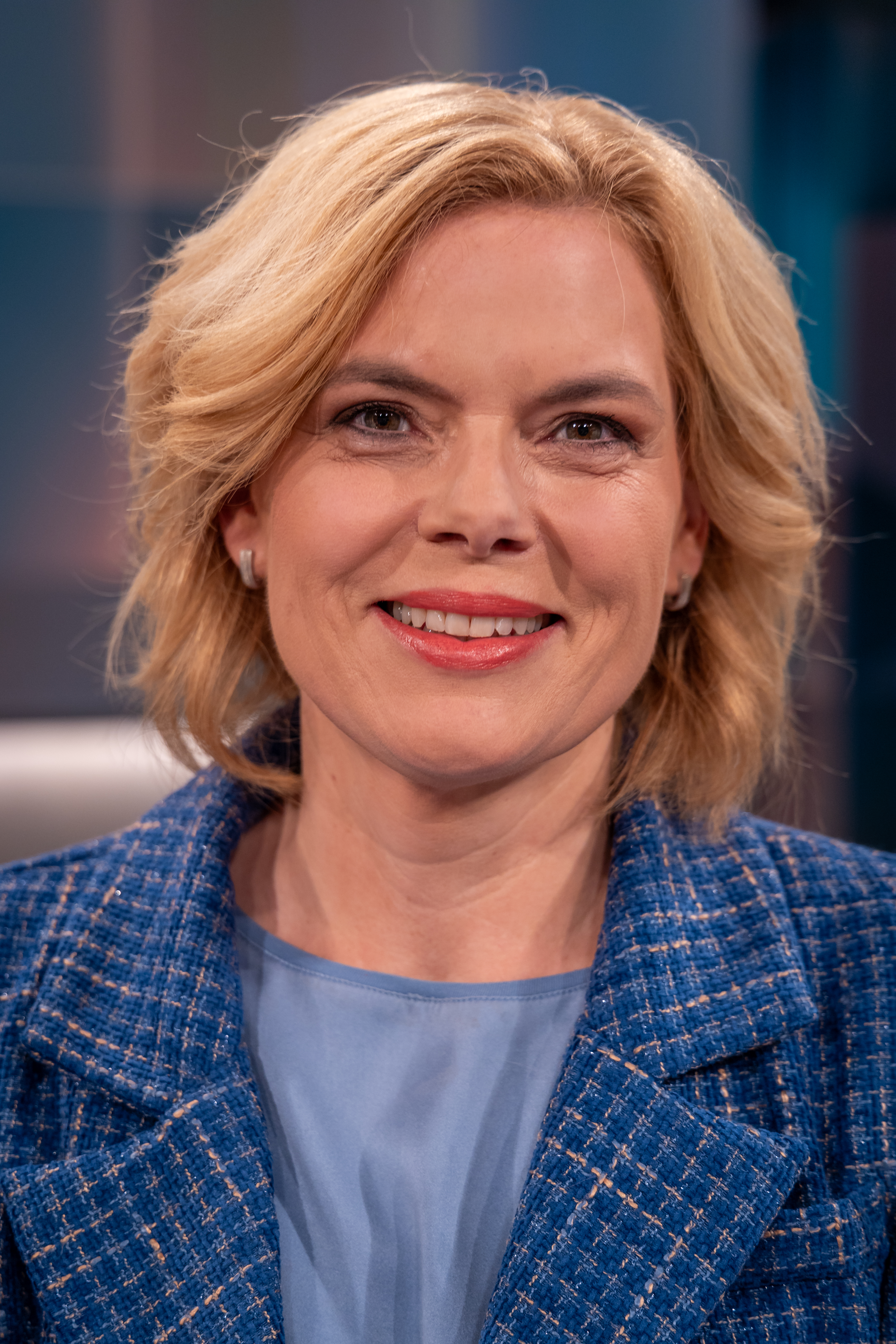
- Klöckner in 2024

President of the Bundestag
- Incumbent
- Assumed office 25 March 2025
- Preceded by: Bärbel Bas

Minister of Food and Agriculture
- In office 14 March 2018 – 8 December 2021
- Chancellor: Angela Merkel
- Preceded by: Christian Schmidt
- Succeeded by: Cem Özdemir

Leader of the Christian Democratic Union in Rhineland-Palatinate
- In office 25 September 2010 – 26 March 2022
- Preceded by: Christian Baldauf
- Succeeded by: Christian Baldauf

Deputy Leader of the Christian Democratic Union
- In office 4 December 2012 – 20 January 2022 Serving with Jens Spahn, Silvia Breher, Volker Bouffier and Thomas Strobl
- Leader: Angela Merkel; Annegret Kramp-Karrenbauer; Armin Laschet
- Preceded by: Annette Schavan
- Succeeded by: Karin Prien

Leader of the Christian Democratic Union in the Landtag of Rhineland-Palatinate
- In office 18 May 2011 – 14 March 2018
- Preceded by: Christian Baldauf
- Succeeded by: Christian Baldauf

Member of the Landtag of Rhineland-Palatinate for Bad Kreuznach
- In office 18 May 2011 – 1 April 2018
- Preceded by: Carsten Pörksen
- Succeeded by: Helmut Martin

Parliamentary Secretary of State for Food, Agriculture and Consumer Protection
- In office 27 September 2009 – 15 February 2011
- Minister: Ilse Aigner
- Preceded by: Ursula Heinen
- Succeeded by: Peter Bleser

Member of the Bundestag for Rhineland-Palatinate
- Incumbent
- Assumed office 26 October 2021
- Preceded by: Antje Lezius
- Constituency: Kreuznach
- In office 17 October 2002 – 18 May 2011
- Preceded by: Fritz Rudolf Körper
- Succeeded by: Antje Lezius
- Constituency: Kreuznach

Personal details
- Born: 16 December 1972 (age 53) Bad Kreuznach, Rhineland-Palatinate, West Germany
- Party: CDU (since 1997)
- Spouse: Ralph Grieser (m. 2019; div. 2023)
- Domestic partner(s): Helmut Ortner (2000–2017); Jörg Pilawa (since 2025)
- Education: University of Mainz

Julia Klöckner (born 16 December 1972) is a German politician of the Christian Democratic Union (CDU) who has been serving as President of the German Bundestag since 25 March 2025.

Previously, Klöckner served as Federal Minister of Food, Agriculture and Consumer Protection in the government of Chancellor Angela Merkel from 2018 to 2021. Since 2012, she has also been part of the CDU leadership.

Klöckner first became known in 1995 when she was chosen as the German Wine Queen (Deutsche Weinkönigin). From 2002 to 2011 she was a Member of Parliament for Kreuznach in the German Bundestag and, from 2009 to February 2011, she was a parliamentary undersecretary in the Federal Ministry of Food, Agriculture and Consumer Protection. Since 25 September 2010 she has chaired the Rhineland-Palatinate CDU party and, since March 2011, the CDU group in the Landtag of Rhineland-Palatinate, the state parliament. Since 15 November 2010 she has been on the CDU's national Präsidium (executive committee) and on 4 December 2012 she was elected as one of the Deputy Federal Chairpeople of the CDU.

== Early life and education ==
Klöckner was born on 16 December 1972 in the German spa town of Bad Kreuznach. She grew up in Guldental as the youngest child of a vintner's family. After taking her Abitur in 1992 at the Gymnasium an der Stadtmauer grammar school in Bad Kreuznach, Klöckner studied for a degree in political science, Catholic theology and education, passing her first Staatsexamen in 1998 in Social Studies and Religion and receiving her Master of Arts (MA) at the Johannes Gutenberg University in Mainz.

== Professional career ==
After her intermediate examination, Klöckner worked, with special permission, from 1994 to 1998 as a religious education teacher at a primary school in Wiesbaden, and then began her practical training as a journalist. In 1994 she was chosen as the "Wine Queen of the Nahe valley" (Nahe Weinkönigin) and, in 1995, as the German Wine Queen. In this capacity, she presented Pope John Paul II with a bottle of Riesling.

From 1998 to 2002, Klöckner worked in the department of regional culture at SWR television in Mainz as a freelancer and, from 2000 to 2002, she was editor of the magazine, weinwelt ("Wine World"). From 2001 to 2009, she was chief editor of Sommelier magazine published by Meininger Verlag.

== Political career ==
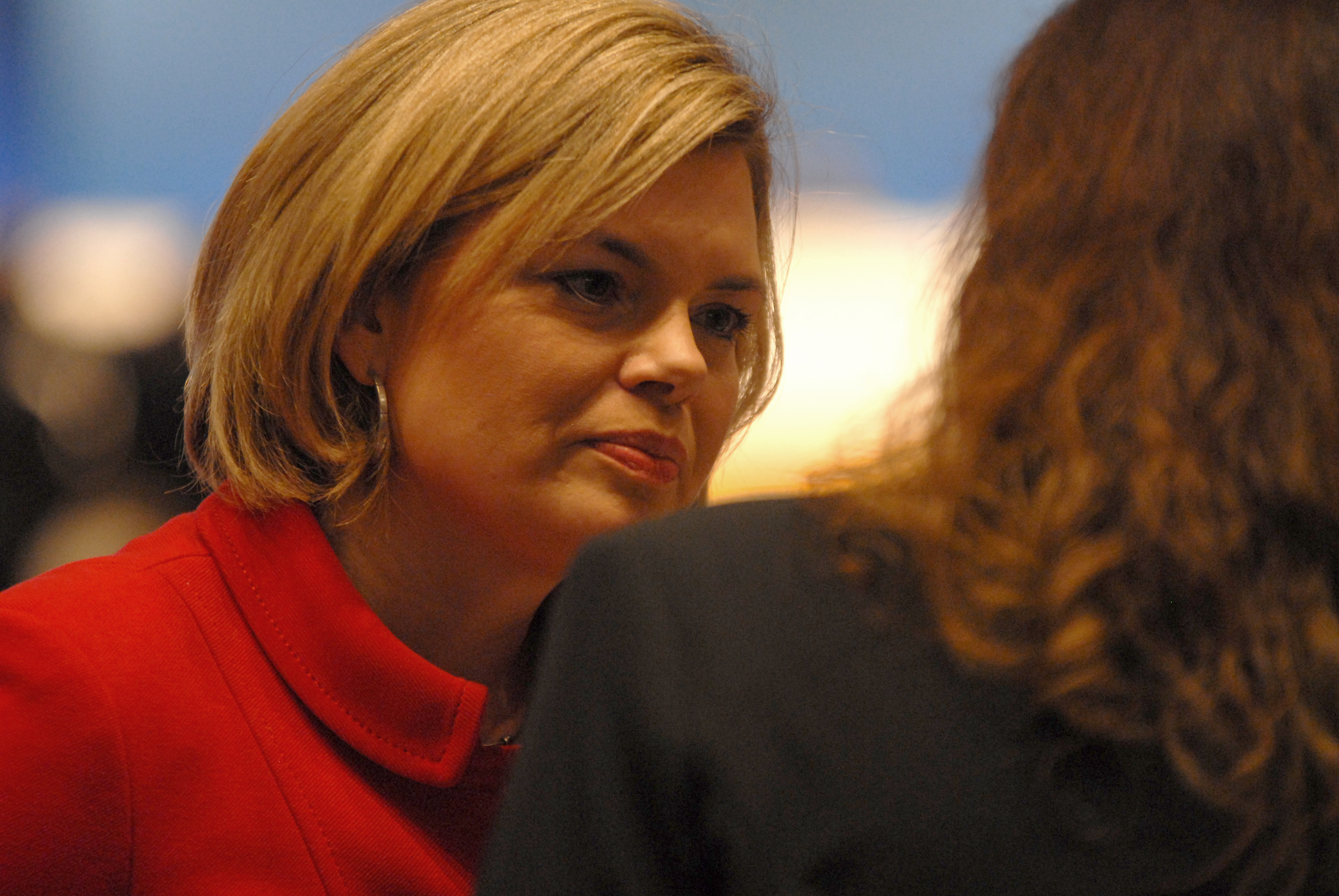
Klöckner at the CDU party conference in 2012

=== Early beginnings ===
In 1996, Klöckner joined the Junge Union (JU), the Frauen Union (FU, the German "Women's Union"), the Christian Democratic Union party, the Europa Union and the Young European Federalists. In 2001 she became a member of the JU's local board in Bad Kreuznach, an office she held until 2007. In the same year she also became a member of the local (county-level) CDU board in Bad Kreuznach. In 2002, Klöckner became a member of the Regional Committee on Security Policy and the Armed Forces and the JU Regional Executive of Rhineland-Palatinate, where she stayed until 2007.

=== Member of the Bundestag, 2002–2011 ===
First term, 2002–2005

In October 2002, following the German federal election that year, Klöckner entered the German parliament, the Bundestag, via the Rhineland-Palatinate list of state candidates, having scored 7% less than her SPD rival Fritz-Rudolf Körper in the first round of voting.

On 14 November 2002 Klöckner was elected as one of the secretaries of the Bundestag's plenary sessions. In addition she joined the board of trustees of the Federal Agency for Civic Education. Later she became a member of the Committee for Consumer Protection, Food and Agriculture. and alternate member of the Committee for Human Rights and Humanitarian Aid. In 2003 she joined the commission of inquiry into "Ethics and Rights in Modern Medicine" and was a member of its sub-groups: "Ethics in Bioscientific and Medical Research" and "Transplantation Medicine". She also founded a parliamentary wine forum and belonged to the all-party discussion group on hospice and palliative care.

Klöckner became a member of the "Young Group" (Junge Gruppe) of the CDU/CSU parliamentary group in the Bundestag, where she served as deputy chairwoman.

Second term, 2005–2009

In the federal elections in 2005 Klöckner secured the constituency of Kreuznach for the CDU for the first time in around 50 years with 43.0% of voters placing her first. On 15 December 2005 she was re-elected as secretary to the Bundestag.

On 24 January 2006 Klöckner was elected to the board of the CDU/CSU parliamentary group in the Bundestag. She was a full member of the committee for consumer Protection and an alternate member of the Committee for the Environment, Nature Conservation and Reactor Safety. On 2 June 2006 she also joined the Parliamentary Advisory Board for Sustainable Development. In addition, she served as deputy chairwoman of the Parliamentary Friendship Group for Relations with Belgium and Luxembourg.

On 23 October 2007 Klöckner was unanimously voted as deputy chairwoman and thus as chairwoman of the working group for Food, Agriculture and Consumer Protection in the CDU/CSU parliamentary group. She was part of this working group until 2009.

In July 2008 Klöckner began a two-year stint as chairwoman of the newly constituted consumer advisory body of Schufa established to represent the interests of consumer protection.

In the 2009 federal elections Klöckner was confirmed as the directly elected member of parliament for the constituency of Kreuznach/Birkenfeld with 47.0% of first votes and an 18% lead over her SPD rival. In the negotiations to form a coalition government of the Christian Democrats (CDU together with the Bavarian CSU) and the Free Democratic Party (FDP), she was part of the CDU/CSU delegation in the working group on environment, agriculture and consumer protection policies, led by Ilse Aigner and Michael Kauch.

After the constitution of the Rhineland-Palatinate parliament on 18 May 2011, Klöckner resigned her seat in the Bundestag on 27 May 2011.

=== Parliamentary State Secretary ===
On 29 October 2009, Klöckner was appointed as a Parliamentary State Secretary of the Federal Ministry of Food and Agriculture under Minister Ilse Aigner. In February 2011 she resigned from this office in order to run the CDU in Rhineland-Palatinate. Her successor in this office is Peter Bleser (CDU).

=== State politics in Rhineland-Palatinate ===
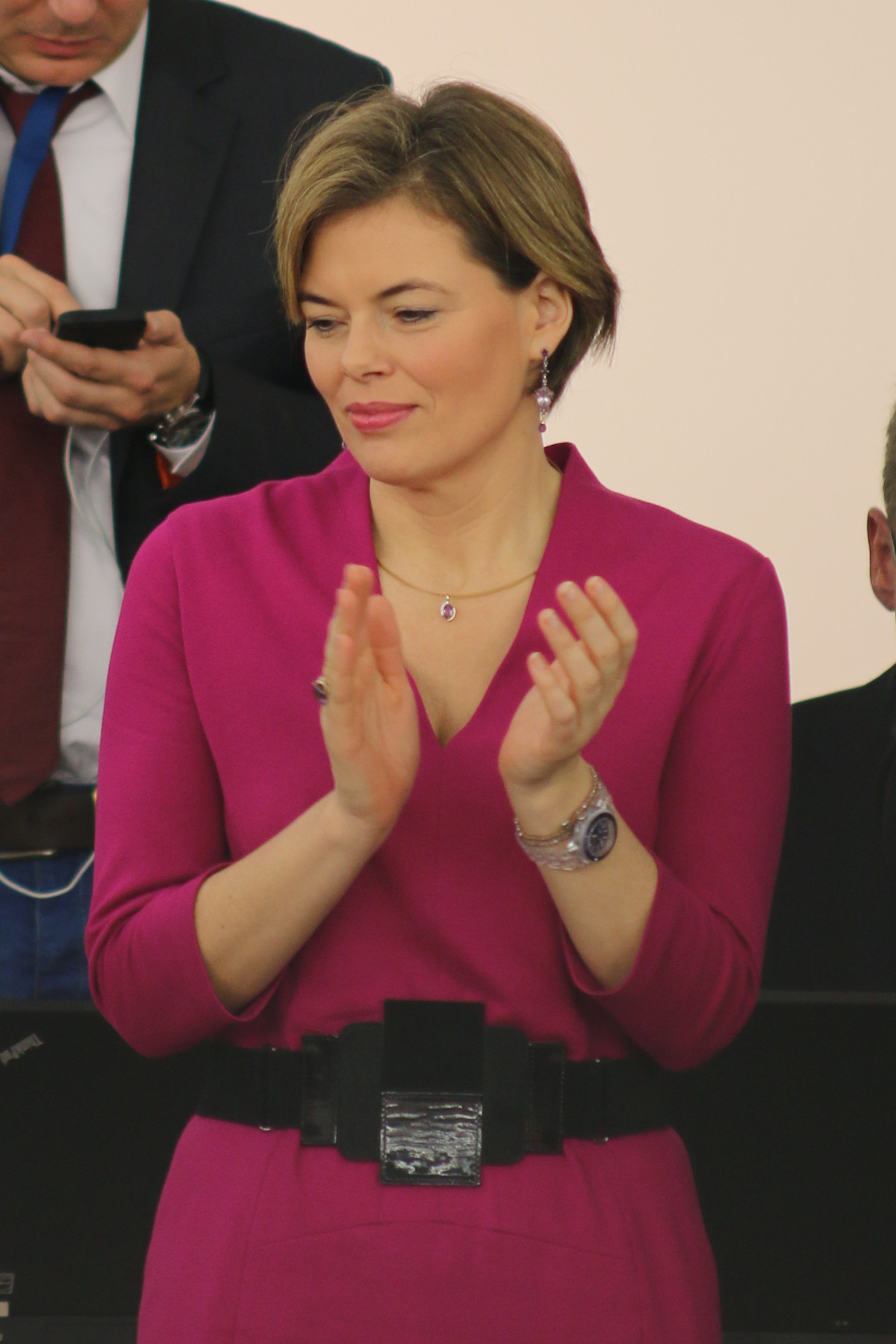
Klöckner attending parliament in 2014

Within the Rhineland-Palatinate CDU, Klöckner moved up to the party's state executive committee in 2003. On 13 June 2004 Julia Klöckner was elected to the county council (Kreistag) of Bad Kreuznach with 42,888 votes, the highest number of votes of the 50 CDU candidates. In the next council elections on 7 June 2009 she was again elected with the most votes (this time 46,759 votes).

On 8 July 2006 Klöckner was elected as Deputy State Chairwoman of the Rhineland-Palatinate CDU with 91.5% of the vote on the CDU Party's 59th Regional Day.

On 17 November 2009, Klöckner was proposed by the CDU chairman for Rhineland-Palatinate, Christian Baldauf, as the lead candidate for the 2011 state elections. On 17 April 2010 she was duly elected as the CDU's front runner at the CDU state party conference in Bingen am Rhein with 400 out of 402 votes cast (99.5%). On 25 September 2010 at the state party conference in Mainz, she was elected as leader of the Rhineland-Palatinate CDU with 96.9% of the vote. On 4 December 2010 she achieved first place in the state list for the 2011 elections at the party conference of the Rhineland-Palatinate CDU Association in Ramstein-Miesenbach, gaining 99.6% of the votes.

In the state elections on 27 March 2011, voters gave Klöckner the direct mandate for the constituency of Bad Kreuznach with 44.4% of the votes. After scoring their lowest result in the 2006 elections with only 32.8% of the vote, the CDU's performance state level was 2.5% higher than the national trend and just 0.5% behind the SDP, who suffered a historic loss of 9.9% of the vote.

Following the state elections, Klöckner was unanimously elected as the CDU's party leader in the Rhineland-Palatinate parliament on 30 March 2011.

In the 2016 state elections, Klöckner again ran for the office of Minister-President of Rhineland-Palatinate. With the European migrant crisis emerging as the dominating campaign issue, Klöckner responded by trying to harden her line on migrants while carefully avoiding any whiff of disloyalty to Chancellor Angela Merkel. In a joint statement with CDU Baden-Württemberg leading candidate Guido Wolf Klöckner proposed in February 2016 flexible daily quotas for refugee inflows into Germany, which was a step beyond Merkel's "open-doors" policy but not so far as the CSU, the CDU's Bavaria-based sister party, which backed fixed annual limits. No one should be allowed to enter Germany without a reason for asylum or a protection status. She eventually lost against incumbent Malu Dreyer.

=== Role in national politics ===
In 2003, Klöckner was elected to the federal board of the Frauen Union, a national organization for CDU women. In addition she became a deputy member in the board of the European People's Party. On 14 May 2007 she became the deputy chairwoman of the CDU Commission on the "Preservation of the Creation: Climatic, Environmental and Consumer Protection", where she led the Sub-Commission on Consumer Protection.

At the 23rd national CDU party conference on 15 November 2010, Klöckner became a member of the CDU Präsidium or steering committee with 94.43% of the votes, the highest number of votes out of all 40 candidates. On 4 December 2012 she was elected as one of five deputy chairpersons of the national CDU party with 92.92% of the votes (once again the best result), serving alongside Volker Bouffier, Armin Laschet, Thomas Strobl and Ursula von der Leyen.

Following the 2013 federal elections, Klöckner was part of the CDU/CSU team in the negotiations with the SPD on a coalition agreement for the third government of Chancellor Angela Merkel. By 2016, she was widely seen by commentators as having quietly positioned herself as a leading candidate to replace Merkel.

From 2018 to 2021, Klöckner served as agriculture minister in Merkel's third government. In 2025, she was elected as president of the Bundestag after gaining the support of 382 MPs as against 204 negative votes and 31 abstentions.

== Other activities ==
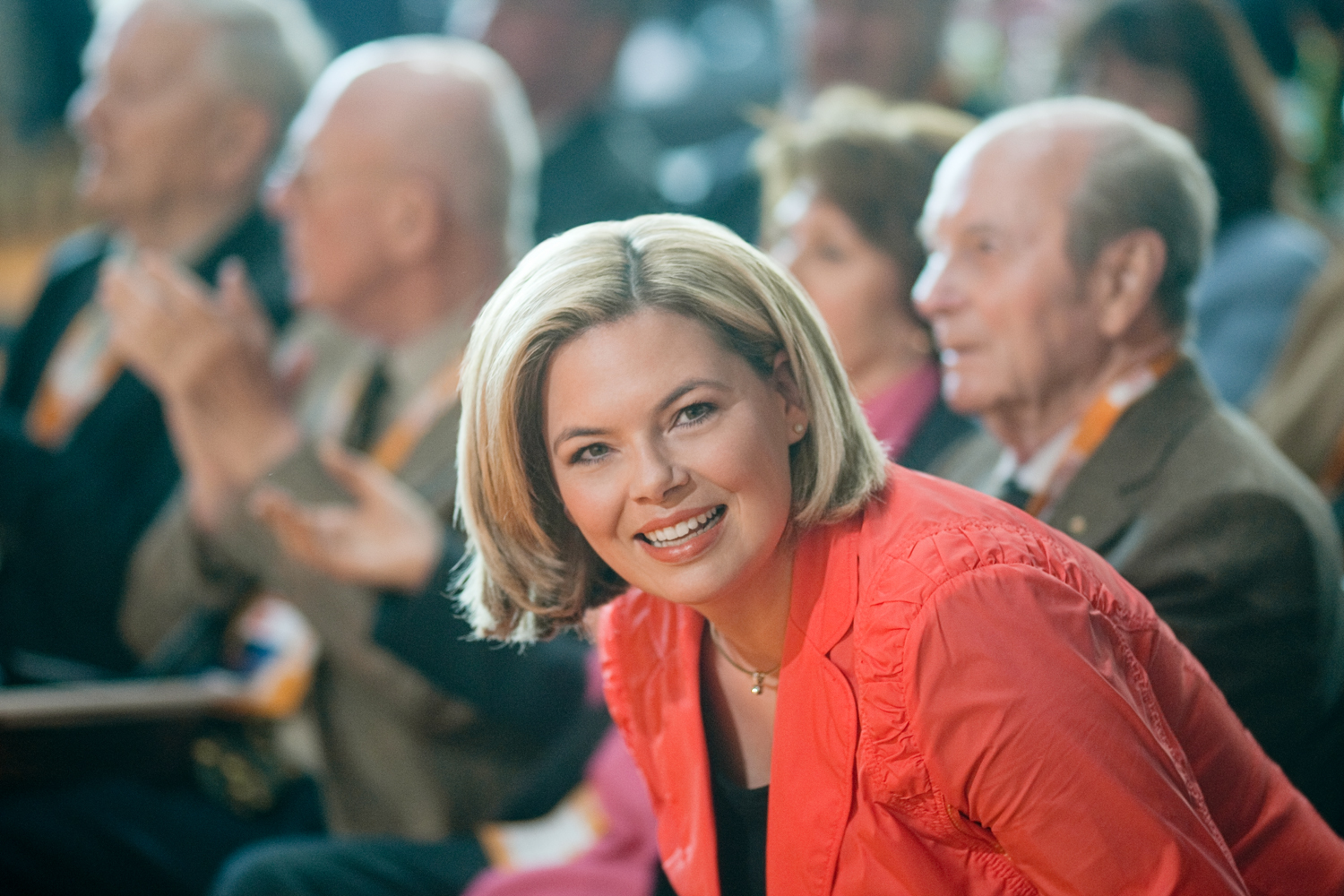
Julia Klöckner in 2010

=== Corporate boards ===
- Landwirtschaftliche Rentenbank, deputy chairwoman of the supervisory board (2018–2021)
- KfW, Ex-officio member of the board of supervisory directors (2018–2021)

=== Non-profit organizations ===
- Südwestrundfunk (SWR), member of the Broadcasting Council
- Caritas Foundation, Mittelpunkt Mensch, chairwoman of the board of trustees
- Cusanuswerk, member of the advisory board
- European Foundation for the Speyer Cathedral, member of the board of trustees
- Konrad Adenauer Foundation, Member
- Plan International – Germany, Member of the Board of Trustees (since 2015)
- Trier University of Applied Sciences, member of the board of trustees
- Ossig Foundation for the Friends of the Bad Kreuznach Children's Clinic, member of the board of trustees
- JugendRaum Foundation, member of the board of trustees
- World Church Foundation, member of the board of trustees
- Central Committee of German Catholics, member of the General Assembly
- Atlantik-Brücke, member and Alumna of the Young Leaders Program

In addition, Klöckner is the patron of the Rhineland-Palatinate State branch of the German Association for Muscular Dystrophy, the German Multiple Sclerosis Association of Bad Kreuznach, the Friends of the Christian Hospice Movement in Bad Kreuznach, Ambulance Service, of the multi-generational home in Idar-Oberstein and the Aktion Niere ("Kidney Action") Foundation.

Klöckner is an honorary member of the German Language Campaign, ambassador for the Lützelsoon Foundation that supports children suffering from cancer and other issues together with their families, the initiator and a judge of the Prize for Consumer Journalism under the patronage of former President of Germany, Roman Herzog. Klöckner is currently a board member of the German Parliamentary Society.

== Political positions ==
=== Social policy ===
Klöckner is a declared opponent of abortion and also favours a ban on stem cell research.

Klöckner herself has benefited from a CDU gender quorum introduced in 1996, as it provided her a good position on the party's candidate list in for the 2002 federal elections. Without the quota, Klöckner has acknowledged in the past, she would not have made it as far within her party. In 2013, she demanded a legally enforced quota calling on publicly traded companies to have women hold a minimum of 30 percent of the seats on their supervisory boards, starting in 2020.

Klöckner supports a criminal ban on buying sex but not selling sex.

=== Human rights ===
In May 2014, Klöckner urged Turks living in Germany to boycott a speech by Turkey's Prime Minister Erdogan, as a protest against his government's crackdown on protests that followed the Soma mine disaster, which had killed 301 people.

When news media in 2014 revealed images purporting to show security guards abusing asylum seekers at a shelter in western Germany, Klöckner said the incident should prompt a review of the country's refugee policy and infrastructure. She also called for Germany to support Italy, Greece, and Turkey in processing asylum applications at registration centres there.

In late 2014, Klöckner spoke out in favour of banning the burka, arguing that the German constitution emphasized that women and men were of equal value and that "looking at people's faces" also belonged to the culture of an open society. In 2019, Klöckner repeated her calls for banning the burka.

=== Foreign policy ===
Speaking on the bilateral relations between Germany and Israel in 2013, Klöckner held that while "Germany has a historical responsibility," this should not be understood as "a blank check to be uncritical in foreign policy."

== Controversies ==
=== 2009 presidential election tweet ===
During the German presidential election, Klöckner prematurely reported on Twitter the results of the vote by the Federal Assembly from the official electoral polling commission (Zählkommission). About 15 minutes before the official announcement of the election result, she tweeted a reference to the last day of the German Bundesliga season: #Bundesversammlung Leute, Ihr könnt in Ruhe Fußball gucke. Wahlgang hat geklappt! ("Federal assembly, people, you can watch football in peace. Election a success!"). Other members of parliament also announced the result via SMS and Twitter prematurely, but justified themselves later, by arguing that they had not participated in the vote counting.

Following criticism of her premature announcement of the result, Klöckner resigned from her post as secretary to the Bundestag.

=== 2019 lobbying accusations ===
In June 2019, Klöckner received criticism over a video that could be interpreted as an "advertisement for Swiss food conglomerate Nestlé". In the clip, Klöckner congratulates Nestle Germany leader Marc-Aurel Boersch for Nestlé's contributions in the wider context of a nation-wide initiative for voluntarily commitments of the food industry to reduce fat, sugar and salt in their products.

=== Threats against Green Youth leader ===
As President of the Bundestag, Klöckner informed the Alliance 90/The Greens parliamentary group that the head of the youth organization, Jette Nietzard, should expect consequences for appearing in an anti-police sweater. She threatened a fine or even the revocation of her parliamentary pass. The letter was leaked to the Bild tabloid.

== Personal life ==
From 2000 to 2017, she was in a relationship with journalist and media manager Helmut Ortner. From 2019 on, Klöckner has been married to an antique cars dealer, Ralph Grieser. The couple separated in 2023. In August 2025, her relationship with television presenter Jörg Pilawa became public. She has no children.

== Publications ==
- Klöckner, Julia; Hartmann, Thomas (1998), Der Wein erfreue des Menschen Herz (in German), Fribourg: Paulusverlag, ISBN 3-7228-0446-9
- Klöckner, Julia; Hartmann, Thomas (2008), Irdischer Wein – Himmlischer Genuss (in German), Fribourg: Paulusverlag, ISBN 978-3-7228-0748-5

Political offices
Preceded by Christian Schmidt	Minister of Food and Agriculture; 2018–2021	Succeeded by Cem Özdemir
Preceded by Bärbel Bas	President of the Bundestag; 2025–present	Incumbent
Order of precedence
Preceded by Frank-Walter Steinmeier as President	Order of precedence of Germany; President of the Bundestag	Succeeded by Friedrich Merz as Chancellor
