= Erwin Rüddel =

German politician (1955–2025)

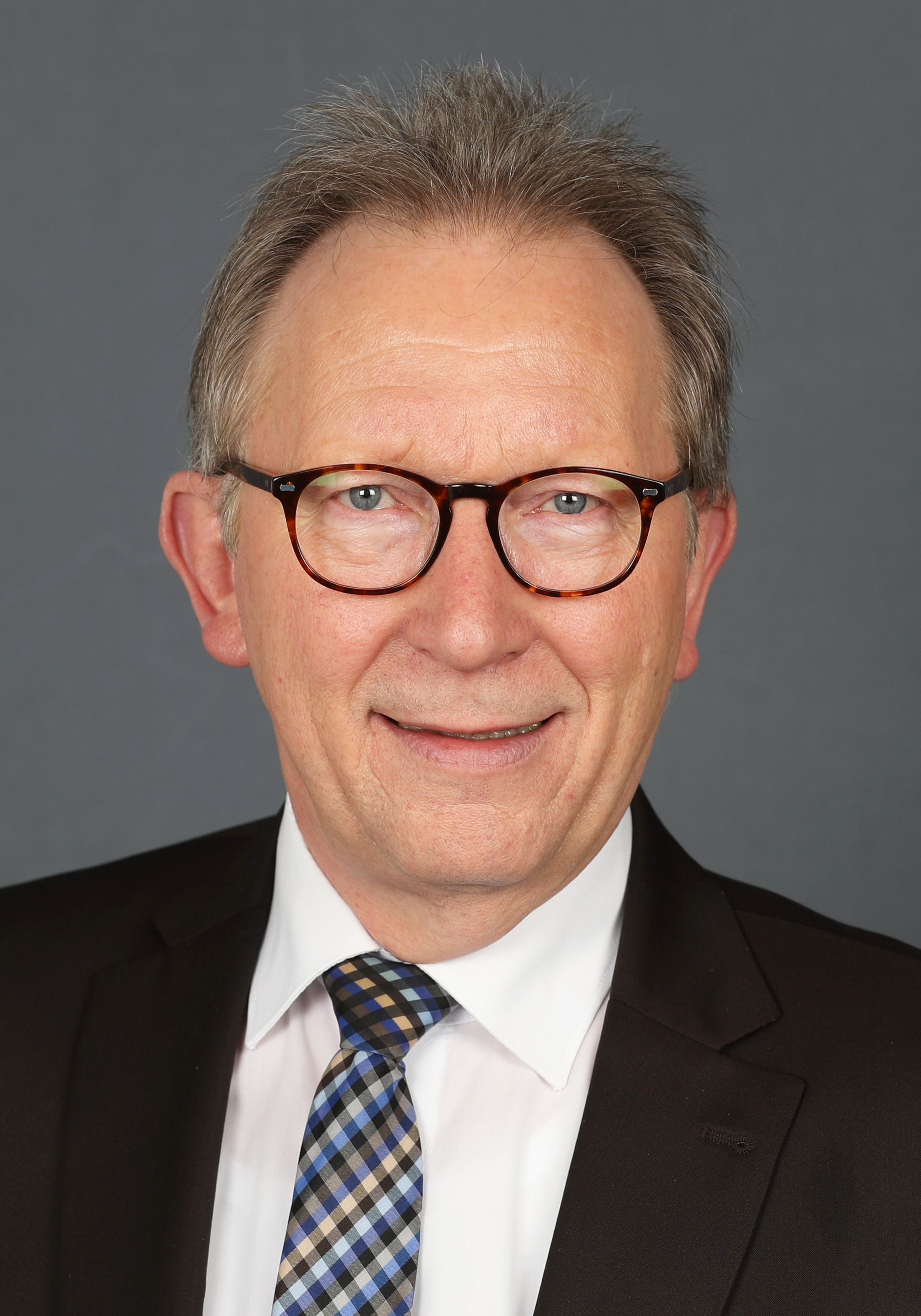
- Rüddel in 2020

Member of the Bundestag
- In office 2009 – 3 February 2025
- Preceded by: Sabine Bätzing-Lichtenthäler

Personal details
- Born: 21 December 1955 Bonn, North Rhine-Westphalia, West Germany
- Died: 3 February 2025 (aged 69) Asbach, Rhineland-Palatinate, Germany
- Party: CDU

Erwin Rüddel (21 December 1955 – 3 February 2025) was a German politician of the Christian Democratic Union (CDU) who served as a member of the Bundestag from the state of Rhineland-Palatinate from 2009 until his death in 2025.

== Political career ==
Rüddel was member of the council of Windhagen from 1984 until 2018. He served as a member of the State Parliament of Rhineland-Palatinate in 1987 and again from 1998 until 2009.

From 2003 until 2008, Rüddel was part of the leadership of the CDU in Rhineland-Palatinate, under successive chairmen Christoph Böhr (2003–2006) and Christian Baldauf (2006–2008).

Rüddel became a member of the Bundestag in the 2009 German federal election, representing the Neuwied district. He was a member of the Health Committee, chairing it beginning in 2018.

In May 2022, Rüddel announced that he would not stand in the 2025 federal elections but instead resign from active politics by the end of the parliamentary term.

== Personal life and death ==
Rüddel was married to Renate since 1980 and had two children. He died suddenly in Asbach, on the morning of 3 February 2025, at the age of 69.

== Other activities ==
=== Corporate boards ===
- Süwag Energie, Member of the Advisory Board

=== Non-profit organizations ===
- Association of German Foundations, Member of the Parliamentary Advisory Board
- Lions Clubs International, Member
