= Joe Weingarten =

German politician

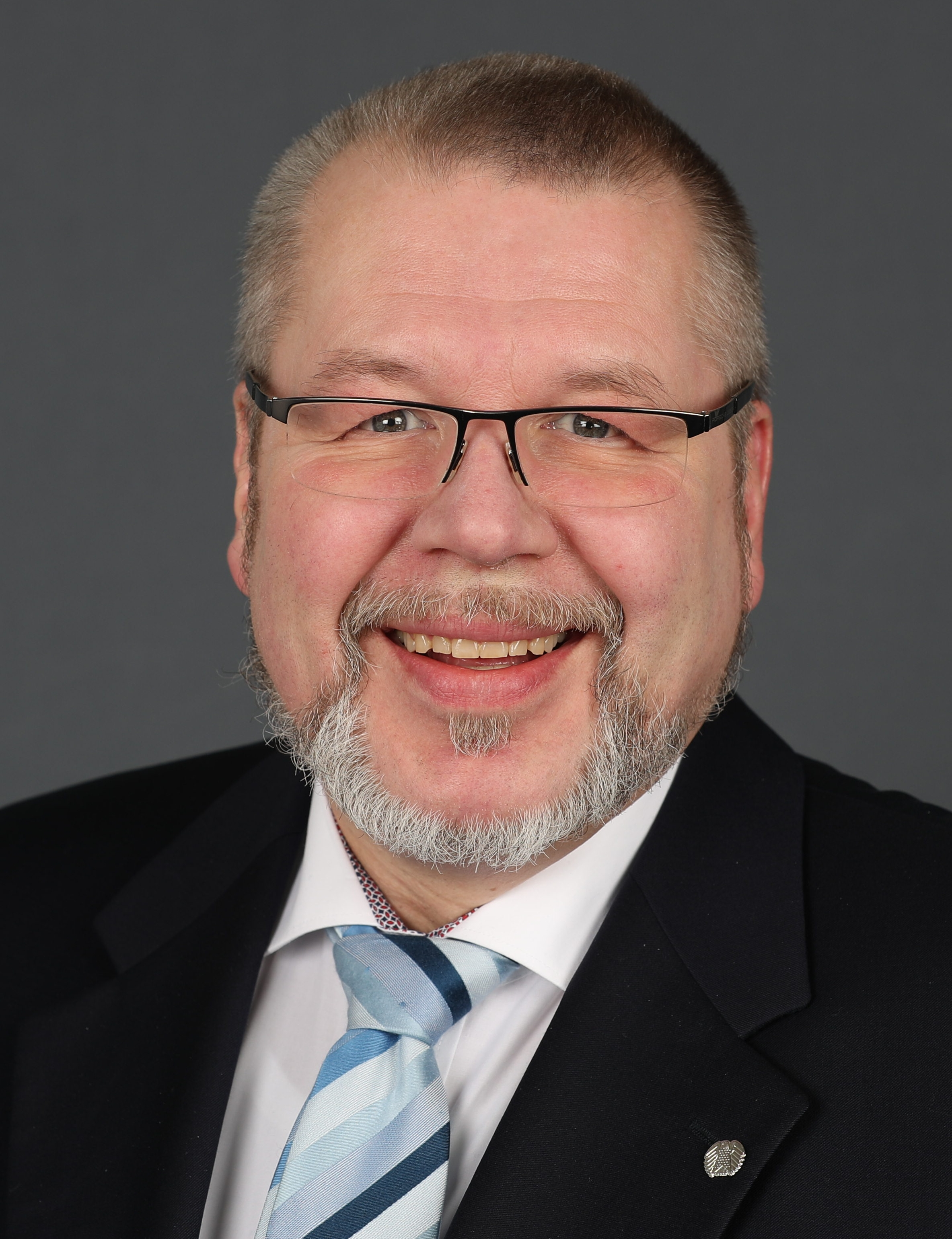

Member of the Bundestag
- In office 2019–2025

Personal details
- Born: 17 March 1962 (age 64) Bad Kreuznach, West Germany (now Germany)
- Citizenship: German
- Party: SPD
- Children: 3

Joe Weingarten (born 17 March 1962 in Bad Kreuznach) is a German Social Democratic Party of Germany politician who has been a member of the Bundestag since 1 November 2019 til 18 March 2025.

== Political career ==
In parliament, Weingarten served on the Defense Committee as well as on the Subcommittee on Disarmament, Arms Control and Non-Proliferation.

In addition to his committee assignments, Weingarten has been serving as deputy chair of the German Parliamentary Friendship Group for Relations with Arabic-Speaking States in the Middle East since 2022. In 2023, he joined a cross-party working group on dogs.

In February 2025, Weingarten lost his seat in Bundestag in district Kreuznach against Julia Klöckner.

== Other activities ==
- Federal Academy for Security Policy (BAKS), Member of the Advisory Board (since 2022)

== Political positions ==
Ahead of the 2025 national elections, Weingarten endorsed Boris Pistorius as the Social Democrats' candidate to succeed Chancellor Olaf Scholz.
