= Martin Diedenhofen =

German politician (born 1995)

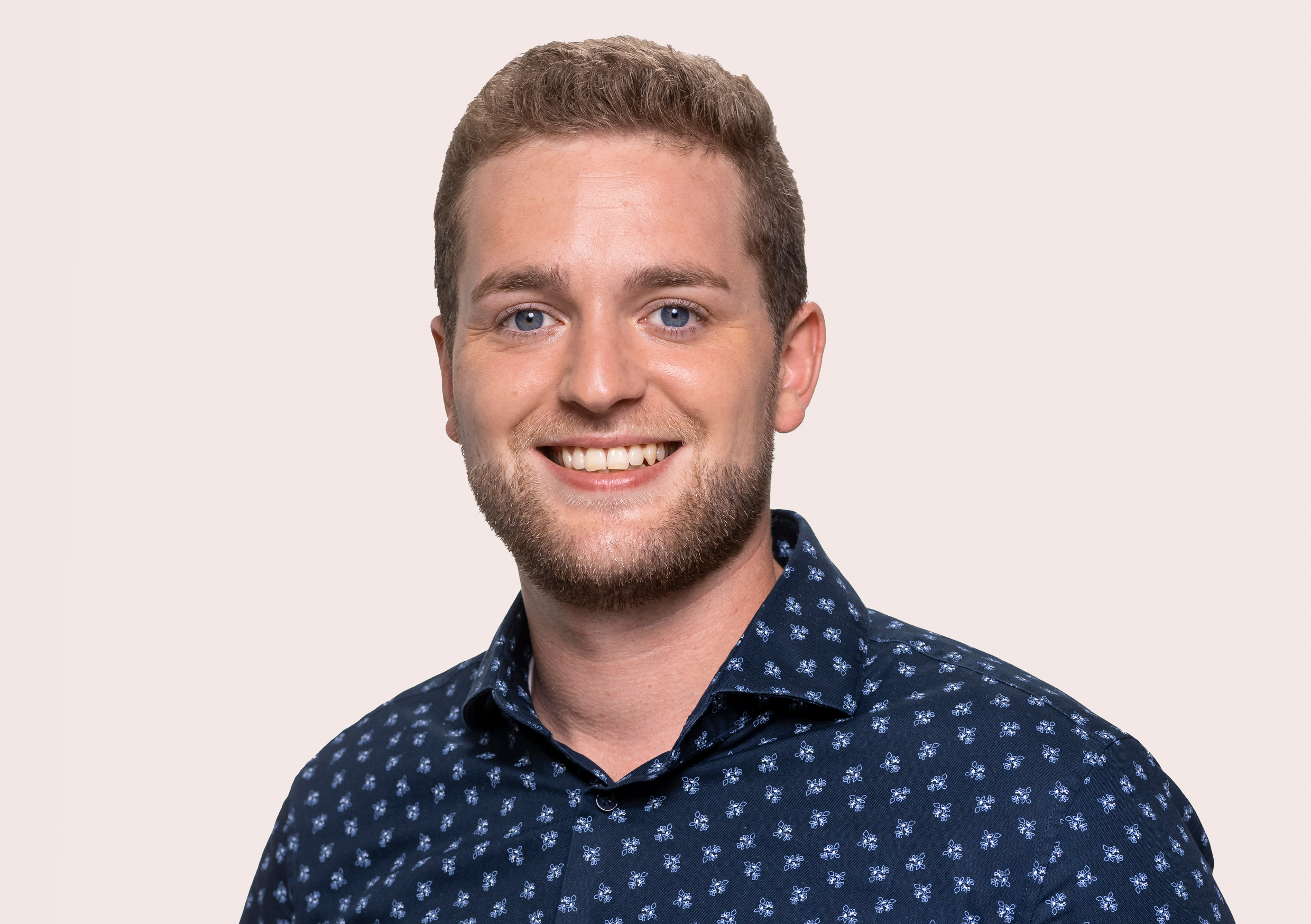

Member of the Bundestag
- Incumbent
- Assumed office 26 October 2021

Personal details
- Born: 5 February 1995 (age 31) Bad Honnef, Germany
- Party: Social Democratic Party

Martin Diedenhofen (born 5 February 1995) is a German politician of the Social Democratic Party (SPD) who has served as a Member of the German Bundestag from 2021 to 2025.

== Political career ==
Diedenhofen is member of the SPD since 2014. He ran unsuccessfully in Neuwied in 2017 but eventually became of the German Parliament in the 2021 elections, representing the Neuwied district. He has since been serving on the Committee on Housing, Urban Development, Building and Local Government.

In December 2024, he announced that he would not stand in the 2025 federal elections.

== Other activities ==
- Education and Science Workers' Union (GEW), Member

== See also ==
- List of members of the 20th Bundestag
