= Manslagt =

- Village of Krummhörn
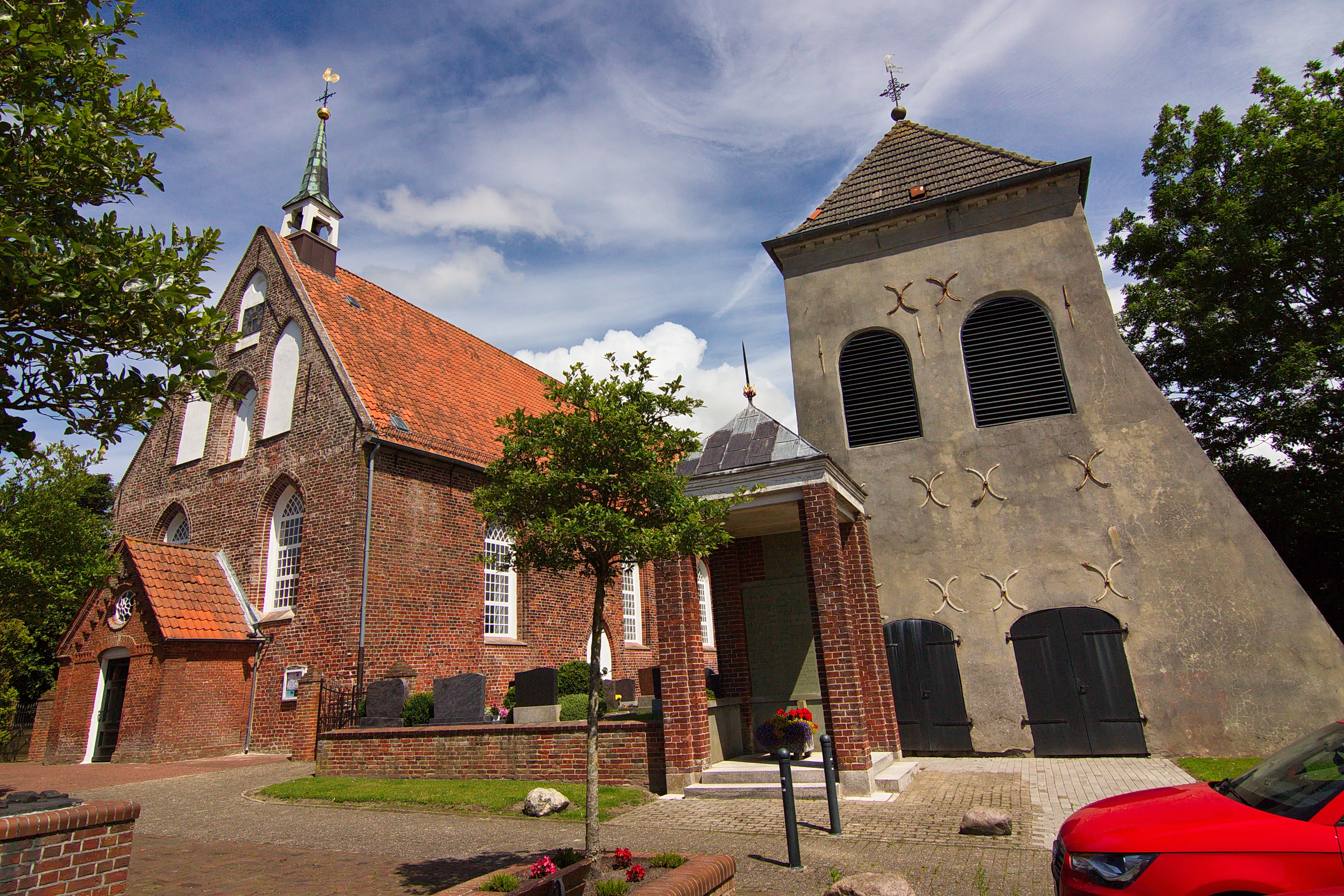
- Church of Manslagt

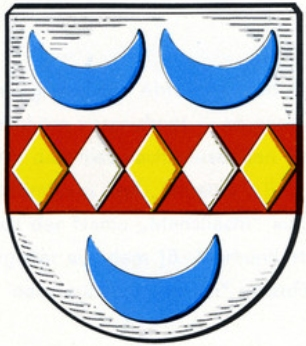
- Coat of arms
- Interactive map of Manslagt
- Location within Germany Location within Lower Saxony
- Country: Germany
- State: Lower Saxony
- District: Aurich
- Municipality: Krummhörn

Area
  - Metro: 8.65 km^{2} (3.34 sq mi)
- Elevation: 1 m (3.3 ft)

Population
  - Metro: 410
- Time zone: UTC+01:00 (CET)
  - Summer (DST): UTC+02:00 (CEST)
- Postal codes: 26736
- Dialling codes: 04923

Manslagt is a village in the region of East Frisia, in Lower Saxony, Germany. It is part of the municipality of Krummhörn. The village is located between Pilsum and Groothusen.

Manslagt was historically located on an island in the former Bay of Sielmönken and was built on a warft. It was first mentioned around the 11th century. The Church of Manslagt dates from around 1400.

== Gallery ==
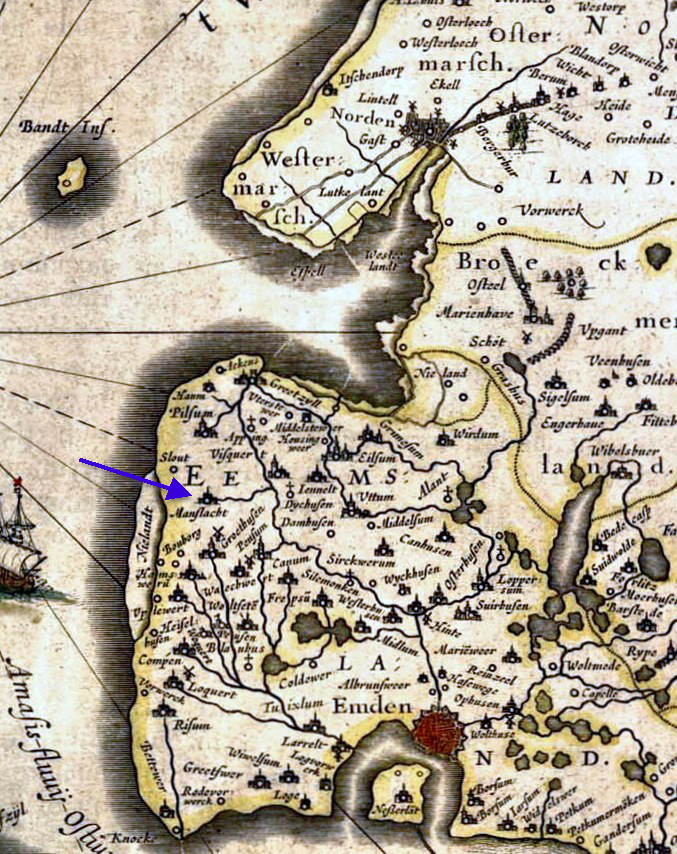
Location of Manslagt on a map by Ubbo Emmius, 1600

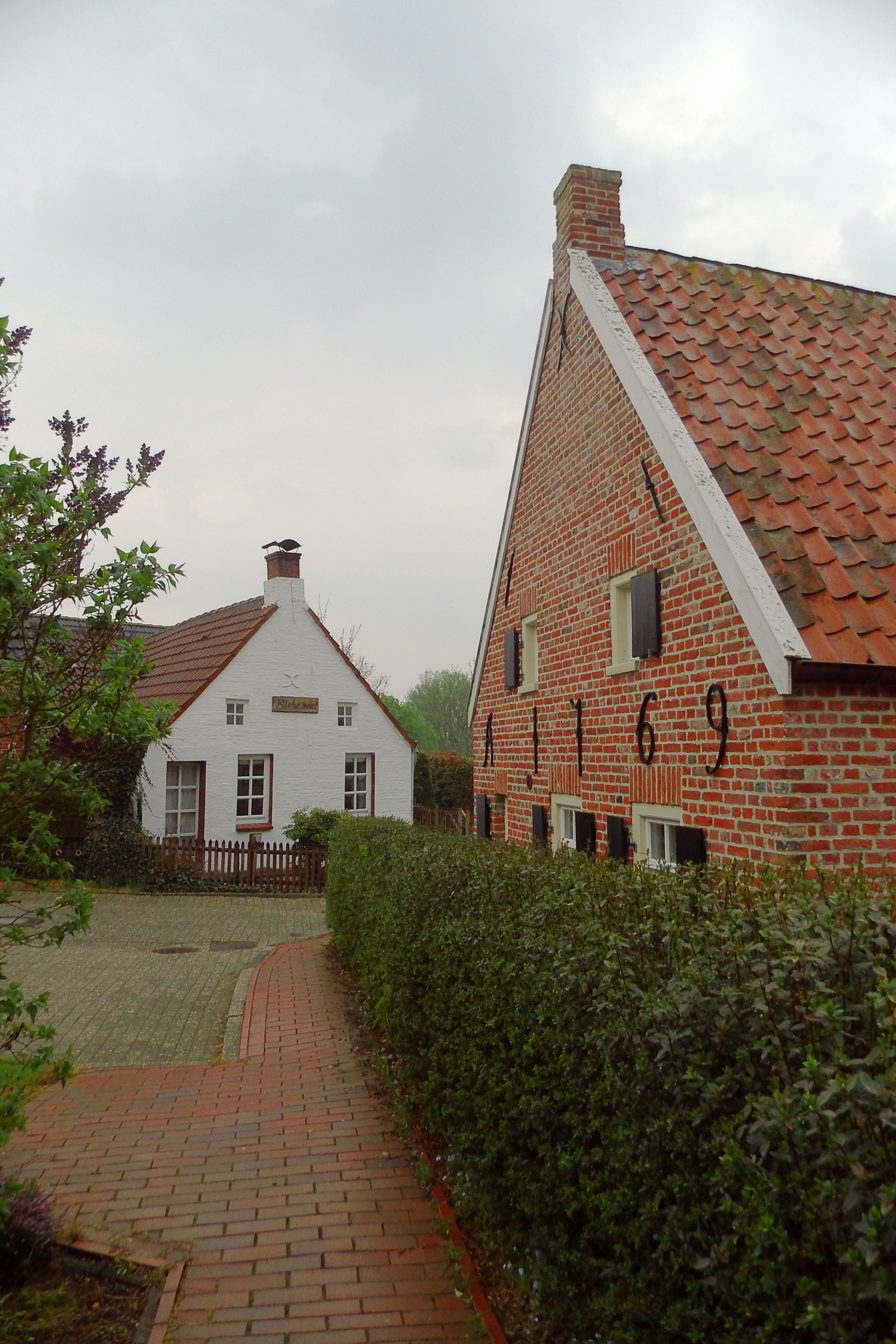
Houses in Manslagt

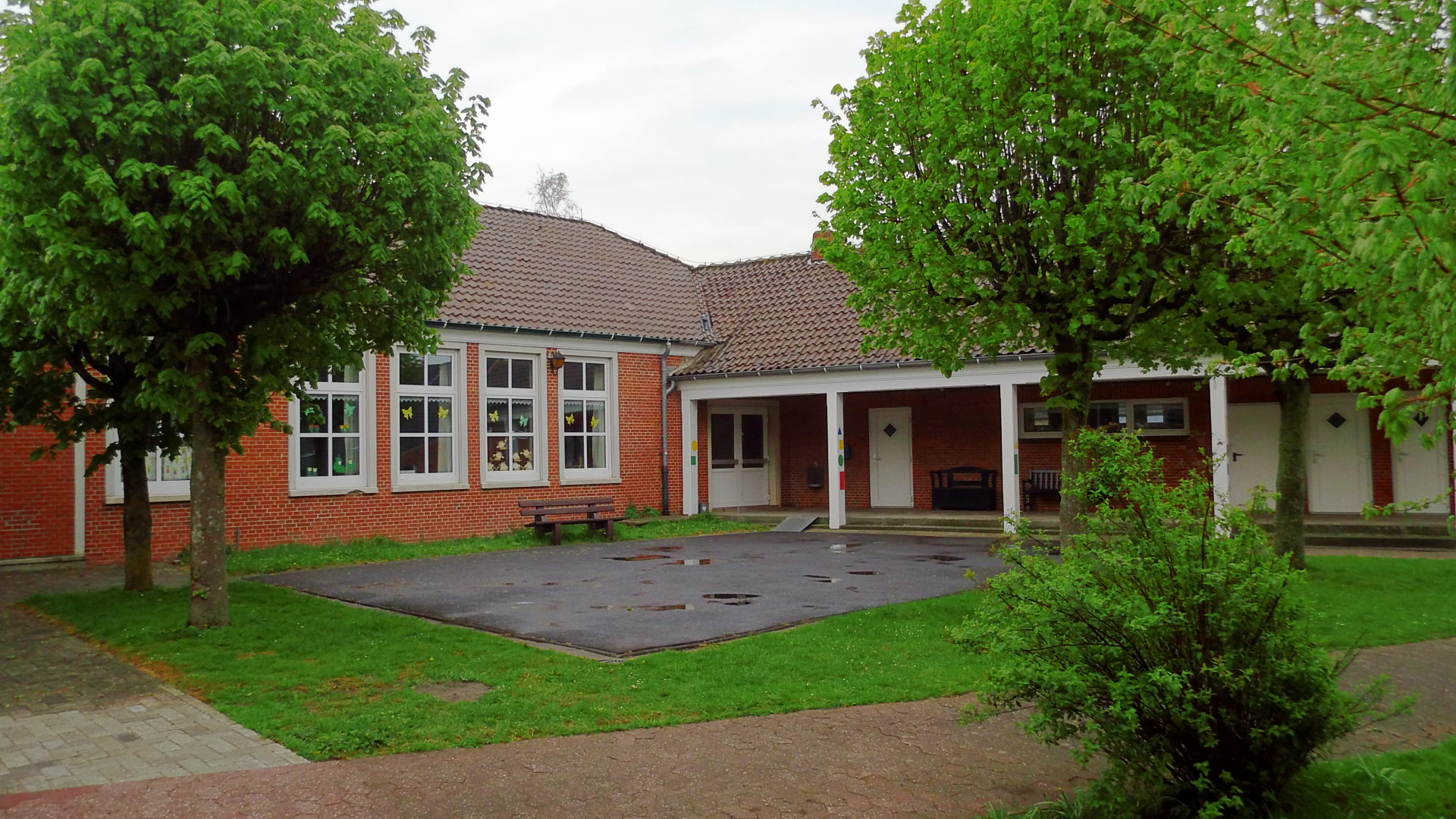
Former school, now kindergarten

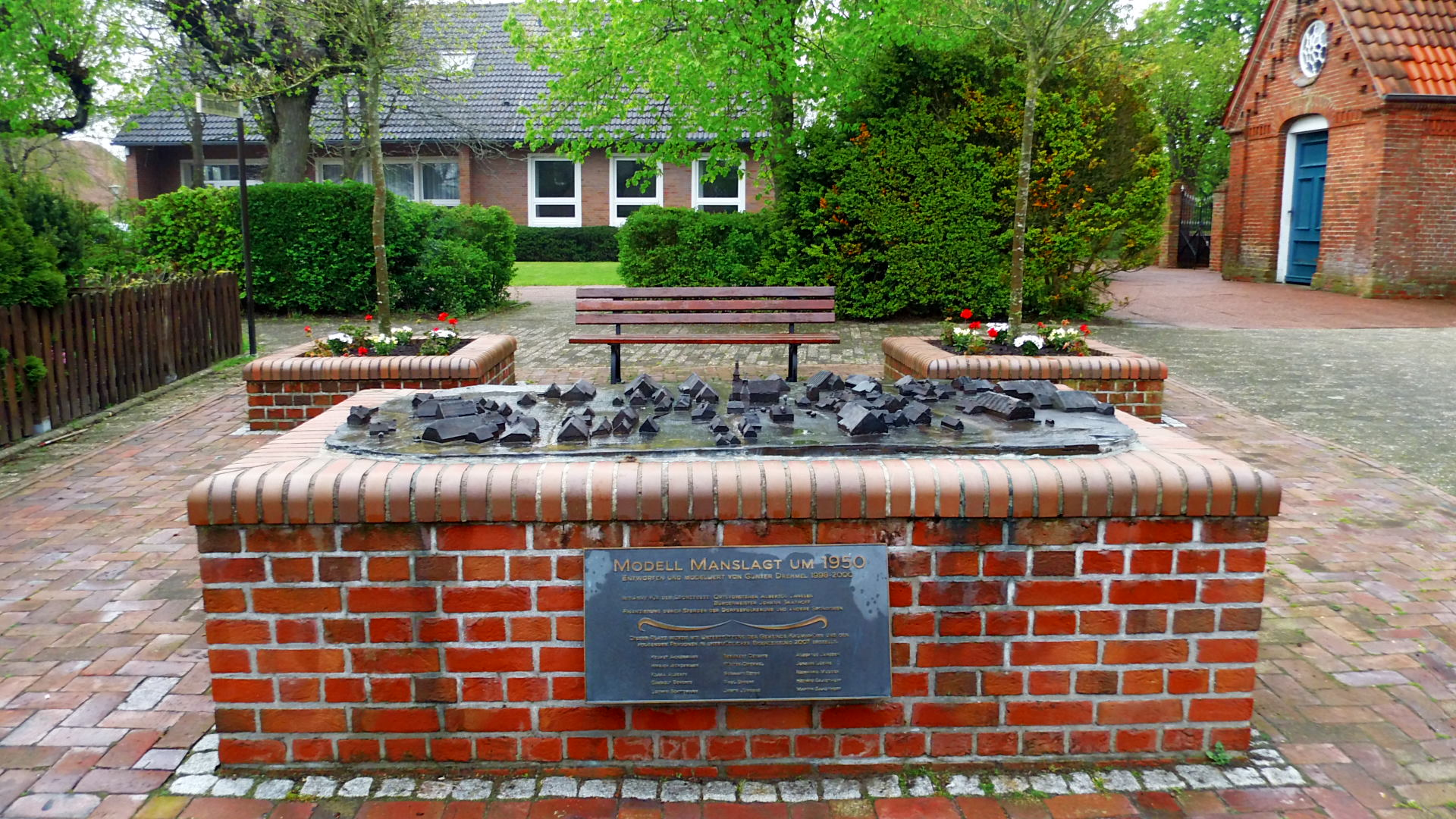
Bronze model of Manslagt

== Notable people ==
- Klaus Immer (1924–2022), politician and Bundestag member
