= Maria Böhmer =

German politician

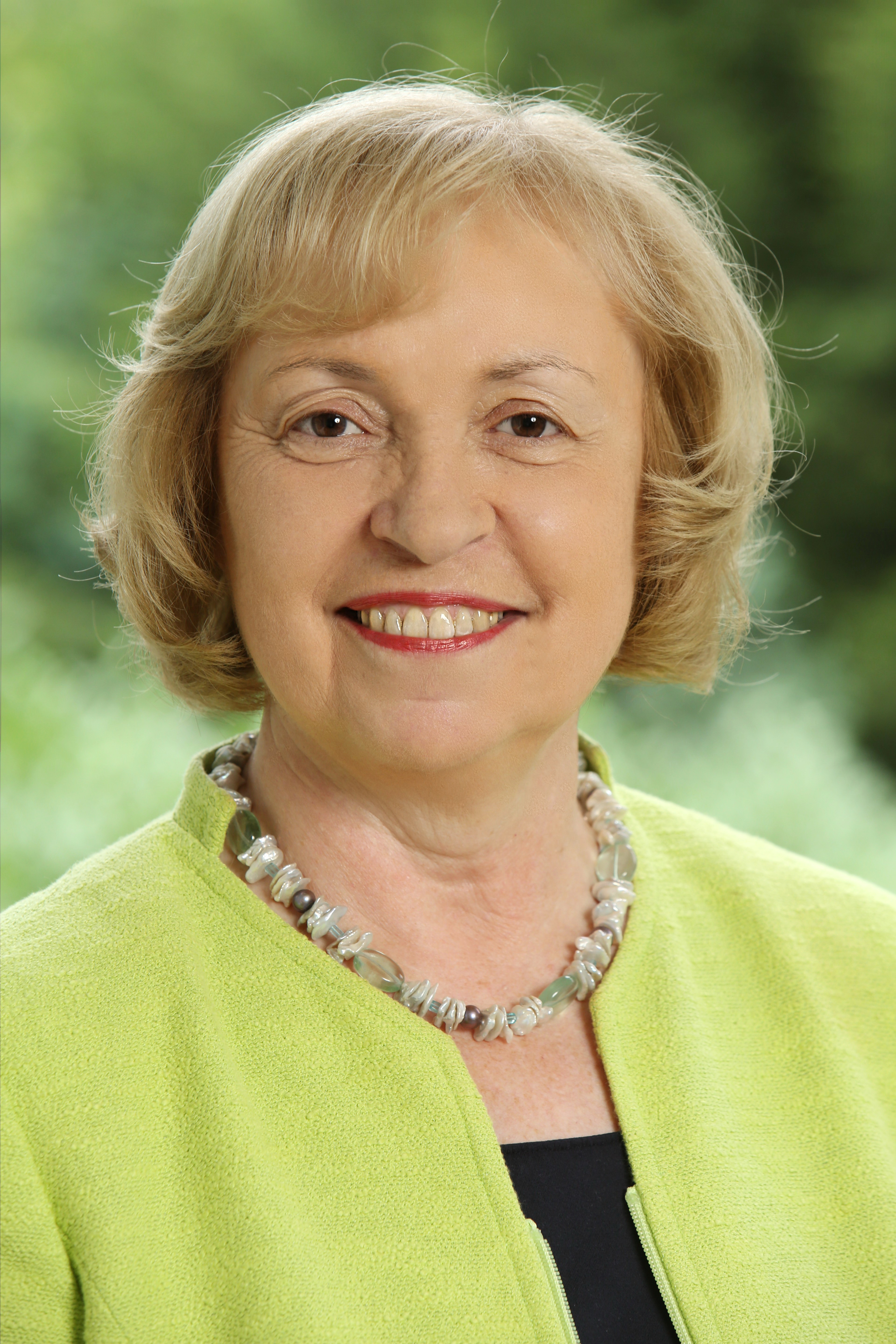

Minister of State for Cultural and Educational Relations
- In office 17 December 2013 – 14 March 2018
- Minister: Frank-Walter Steinmeier; Sigmar Gabriel
- Preceded by: Cornelia Pieper
- Succeeded by: Michelle Müntefering

Minister of State for Migration, Refugees and Integration
- In office 22 November 2005 – 17 December 2013
- Chancellor: Angela Merkel
- Preceded by: Office established
- Succeeded by: Aydan Özoğuz

Member of the Bundestag
- In office 3 October 1990 – 24 September 2017

Personal details
- Born: 23 April 1950 (age 76) Mainz, Rhineland-Palatinate West Germany (now (Germany))
- Party: Christian Democratic Union
- Education: University of Mainz

Maria Böhmer (born 23 April 1950) is a German politician of the Christian Democratic Union (CDU). Under the leadership of successive ministers Frank-Walter Steinmeier (2013-2017) and Sigmar Gabriel (2017), she served as Minister of State in the Federal Foreign Office, primarily responsible for cultural relations and education policy.

== Early life and education ==
Born into a family of wine growers, and after graduating high school in 1968, Böhmer studied mathematics, physics, political science and education. In 1971 she passed the state examination, and received her doctorate Dr. phil. In 1974 from the Johannes Gutenberg University in Mainz. Upon receiving her PhD, she conducted research at the universities of Cambridge and Augsburg and gained a post-doctoral qualification in education at the University of Mainz in 1982. In 1993/94, Christian Baldauf was a research associate to her. Since 2001, she has held the title of Associate Professor of Education at Heidelberg University of Education, but does not currently teach there.

== Political career ==
From 1982 to 1990, Böhmer served as State Commissioner for Women in Rhineland Palatinate. Böhmer joined the CDU in 1985. She is a member of the Women's Union, the Local Politics Association of the CDU and CSU of Germany, and the Christian Democratic Employees' Association. From 1990, she was a member of the Bundestag as well as of the Federal Executive Board of the CDU.

Between 1994 and 1998, Böhmer served on the Committee on Labour and Social Affairs as well as on the Committee on Family Affairs. From 2000, she was part of the CDU/CSU parliamentary group's leadership, first under chairman Friedrich Merz (2000–02) and later under chairwoman Angela Merkel (2002–05). From 2001, she served as Chairwoman of the Frauenunion, the CDU's women's organisation. In this capacity, she later publicly endorsed Merkel as the party's candidate to challenge incumbent Chancellor Gerhard Schröder in the 2002 federal elections; instead, Edmund Stoiber ended up being the joint candidate of CDU and CSU.

In 2003, Böhmer was part of a group assigned by then-opposition leader and CDU chairwoman Angela Merkel to draft alternative proposals for social welfare reform in response to Chancellor Gerhard Schröder's "Agenda 2010". The so-called Herzog Commission – named after its chairman, former German President Roman Herzog – recommended a comprehensive package of reform proposals including, among other things, decoupling health and nursing care premiums from people's earnings and levying a lump monthly sum across the board instead.

=== Minister of State for Integration in the Federal Chancellery, 2005–13 ===
Following the 2005 federal elections, Böhmer was part of the CDU/CSU team in the negotiations with the SPD on a coalition agreement. In November 2005, she joined the first cabinet of Chancellor Angela Merkel and became Minister of State for Integration in the Federal Chancellery and German Federal Government Commissioner for Migration, Refugees and Integration. In the negotiations to form a coalition government following the 2009 federal elections, she led the CDU/CSU delegation in the working group on families, integration of immigrants and culture.

In 2010, Böhmer proposed to introduce legally binding quotas to boost the low number of people with immigrant backgrounds in public sector jobs, saying it would ensure that the public service sector better mirrored the country's population; however, Germans politicians – both from Böhmer's own conservative Christian Democratic Party as well as from the centre-left opposition – opposed the measure. With a focus on improving the integration of the country's immigrant population, Böhmer later that year rejected the conservative MEP Markus Ferber's call for having immigrants undergo intelligence tests before they are granted residency or citizenship rights in the country. In tackling Germany's shortage of qualified workers, Böhmer favours targeting highly qualified foreign workers through measures such as lowering the minimum wage threshold for migrant workers. Since 2010, Böhmer has been the patron of the German version of anti-racism education charity Show Racism the Red Card.

After the deaths of nine Turkish citizens in a fire at a Ludwigshafen house on 3 February 2008, which media reports said may have been the result of arson involving neo-Nazis, Böhmer visited the fire site with Turkish prime minister Recep Tayyip Erdoğan. In 2010, Böhmer accompanied Chancellor Merkel on a two-day state visit to Turkey. On the occasion of the German government's official celebration to mark the 50th anniversary of the German-Turkish recruitment agreement in 2011, Böhmer – together with Merkel and Erdoğan – thanked the first Turkish guest workers for their services to Germany. When Erdoğan in 2011 called on the large Turkish community living in Germany to teach their children the Turkish language first and then German, Böhmer countered that "[o]nly those with good German have opportunities to advance in our country." In a controversy surrounding a neo-Nazi terrorist cell trial in 2013, she called on the Munich Higher Regional Court to give Turkish media access to the trial.

=== Minister of State in the Federal Foreign Office, 2014–2018 ===
Following the 2013 federal elections, Böhmer was again part of the CDU/CSU team in the negotiations with the SPD on a coalition agreement.

As Minister of State in the Federal Foreign Office, Böhmer was primarily responsible for cultural relations and education policy as well as of the Asia and South America regions. In 2015, she served as chairwoman of the UNESCO World Heritage Committee. When Böhmer’s term as chairwoman ended, Steinmeier appointed her as Special Representative of the Federal Foreign Office for UNESCO World Heritage, UNESCO Cultural Conventions and UNESCO Education and Science Programmes.

During her time in office, Böhmer witnessed the signing of the Comprehensive Agreement on Bangsamoro (CAB) between the Government of the Philippines and the Moro Islamic Liberation Front on 27 March 2014 at the Malacañang Palace in Manila. As Germany's official representative, she took part in the inauguration ceremony for Chilean President Michelle Bachelet on 11 March 2014. Since 2014, she has accompanied German President Joachim Gauck on state visits to the Czech Republic (May 2014), Luxembourg (November 2014), Tanzania (February 2015), Peru (March 2015), and Ireland (July 2015).

In September 2016, Böhmer announced that she would not stand in the 2017 federal elections but instead resign from active politics by the end of the parliamentary term.

She is one of the 75 Union MPs - 68 from the CDU (26.9% of all CDU MPs) and 7 from the CSU (12.5% of all CSU MPs) - who voted in favor of same-sex marriage at the end of June 2017.

== Life after politics ==
In June 2018, Böhmer was elected as President of the German Commission for UNESCO.

== Other activities ==
- Arte, Member of the Programme Advisory Committee
- Stiftung Hambacher Schloss, Deputy Chair of the Advisory Board (since 2020)
- Hertie-Stiftung, Member of the Board of Trustees (since 2016)
- START-Stiftung, Chairwoman of the Board of Trustees (since 2016)
- Central Committee of German Catholics, Member
- Deutschlandstiftung Integration, Member of the Board of Trustees
- European Foundation for the Speyer Cathedral, Member of the Board of Trustees
- Federal Cultural Foundation, ex-officio Member of the Board of Trustees
- International Journalists' Programmes, Member of the Board of Trustees
- Leibniz Association, Member of the Senate
- Stiftung Lesen, Member of the Board of Trustees (since 2015)
- Tarabya Academy, Chairwoman of the Advisory Board
- Turkey: Culture of Change Initiative (TCCI), Member of the Advisory Board
- ZDF Television Council, Member (1992–2016) and deputy chairwoman (2002–2016)
- 2011 FIFA Women's World Cup, Member of the Board of Trustees
