= Sabine Bätzing-Lichtenthäler =

German politician (born 1975)

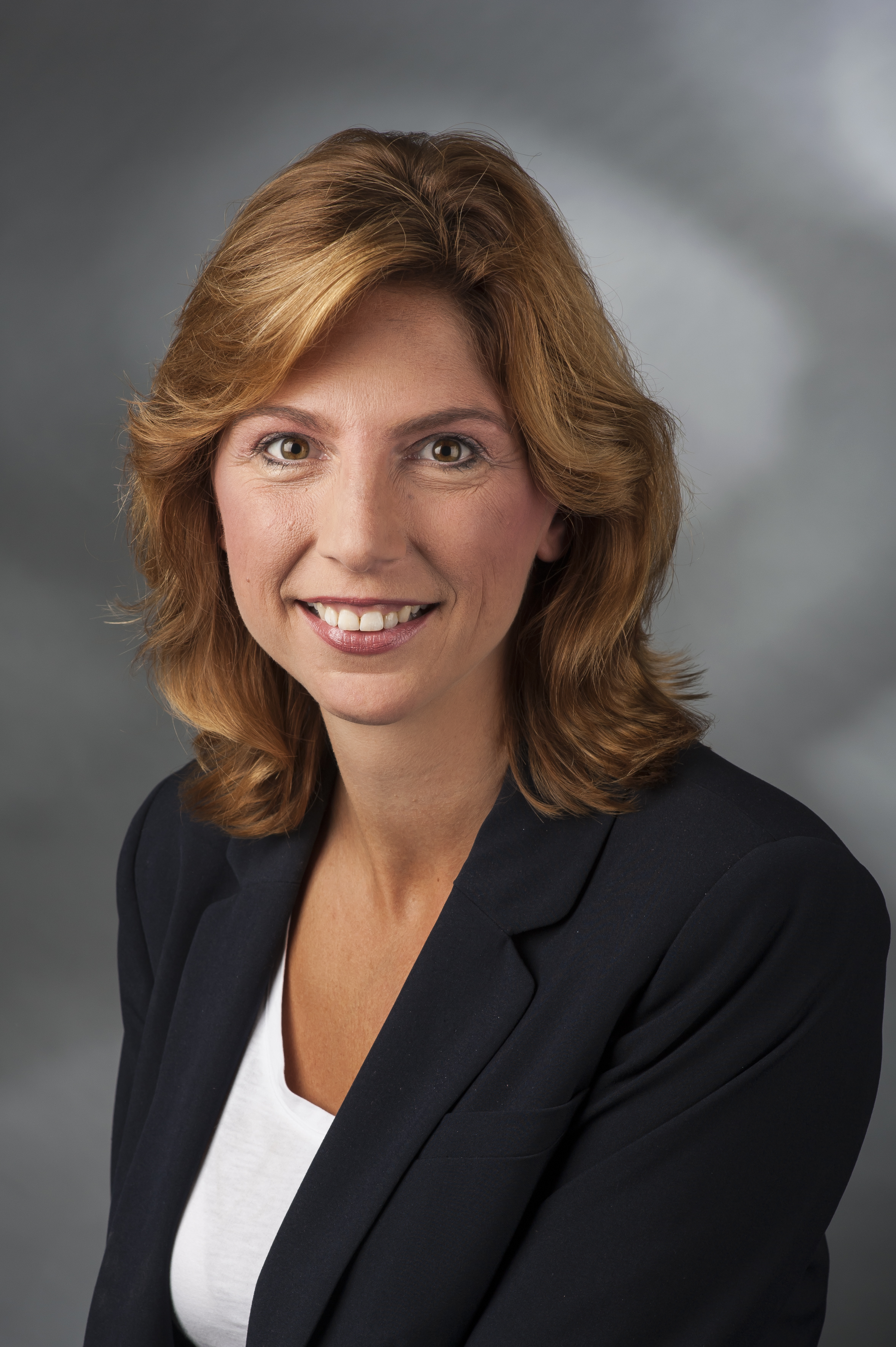

Deputy Minister-President of Rhineland-Palatinate
- Incumbent
- Assumed office 18 May 2026
- Minister- President: Gordon Schnieder

Member of the Bundestag
- In office 2002–2014

Personal details
- Born: 13 February 1975 (age 51) Altenkirchen, Rhineland-Palatinate, West Germany (now Germany)
- Citizenship: German
- Party: Social Democratic Party of Germany (SPD)
- Children: 2
- Occupation: Politician

Sabine Bätzing-Lichtenthäler (born 13 February 1975) is a German politician of the Social Democratic Party of Germany. Since 18 May 2026, she has served as Deputy Minister-President and Minister for Labour, Social Affairs, Women, Family and Youth of the state of Rhineland-Palatinate. She previously served as Minister for Social Affairs, Labour, Health and Demography from 2014 to 2021. Since 2016, she has been a member of the Landtag of Rhineland-Palatinate and led the SPD parliamentary group there from 2021 to 2026. She was also a Member of the German Bundestag from 2002 to 2014, including serving as the Federal Government’s Drug Commissioner from 2005 to 2009.

== Political career ==
=== Member of the German Bundestag, 2002–2014 ===
Bätzing-Lichtenthäler was first elected to be a member of the Bundestag in the 2002 national elections, representing the constituency of Neuwied from 2002 to 2009 and being elected from the land list in 2009. From 2005 until 2009, she served as the German government's commissioner on drug-related issues in the Federal Ministry of Health. Between 2009 and 2013, she was a member of the Finance Committee and the Sports Committee. In addition to her committee assignments, Bätzing-Lichtenthäler was a member of the German-French Parliamentary Friendship Group and of the German-Swiss Parliamentary Friendship Group.

In the negotiations to form a Grand Coalition of Chancellor Angela Merkel's Christian Democrats (CDU together with the Bavarian CSU) and the SPD following the 2013 federal elections, Bätzing was part of the SPD delegation in the working group on financial policy and the national budget, led by Wolfgang Schäuble and Olaf Scholz.

=== State Minister of Social Affairs, 2014–2021 ===
From 2014 until 2021, Bätzing-Lichtenthäler served as State Minister of Social Affairs, Labour and Health in the government of Minister-President Malu Dreyer of Rhineland-Palatinate. As one of her state's representatives at the Bundesrat, she served on the Committee on Labour, Integration and Social Policy; the Committee on Health; and the Committee on Family and Senior Citizen Affairs.

Since the 2016 state elections, Bätzing-Lichtenthäler has been a member of the State Parliament of Rhineland-Palatinate.

In the coalition talks following the 2017 federal elections, Bätzing-Lichtenthäler was part of the working group on social affairs, led by Karl-Josef Laumann, Barbara Stamm and Andrea Nahles.

== Other activities ==
- ZDF, Member of the Television Board (2005-2014)
- German Red Cross (DRK), Member
- German United Services Trade Union (ver.di), Member
