= Klaus Immer =

German politician (1924–2022)

- Born: 9 March 1924; Manslagt, Krummhörn, Hanover, Prussia, Germany
- Died: 8 February 2022 (aged 97); Altenkirchen, Rhineland-Palatinate, Germany
- Occupation: Politician
- Political party: GVP, SPD

Klaus Immer (9 March 1924 – 8 February 2022) was a German politician who served as a member of the Bundestag. He was born in the village of Manslagt in the region of East Frisia, in present-day Lower Saxony state (since November 1946). At the time of Immer's birth, however, the village was part of the State of Hanover. He died in Altenkirchen on 8 February 2022, at the age of 97.
