= Sandra Weeser =

German politician (born 1969)

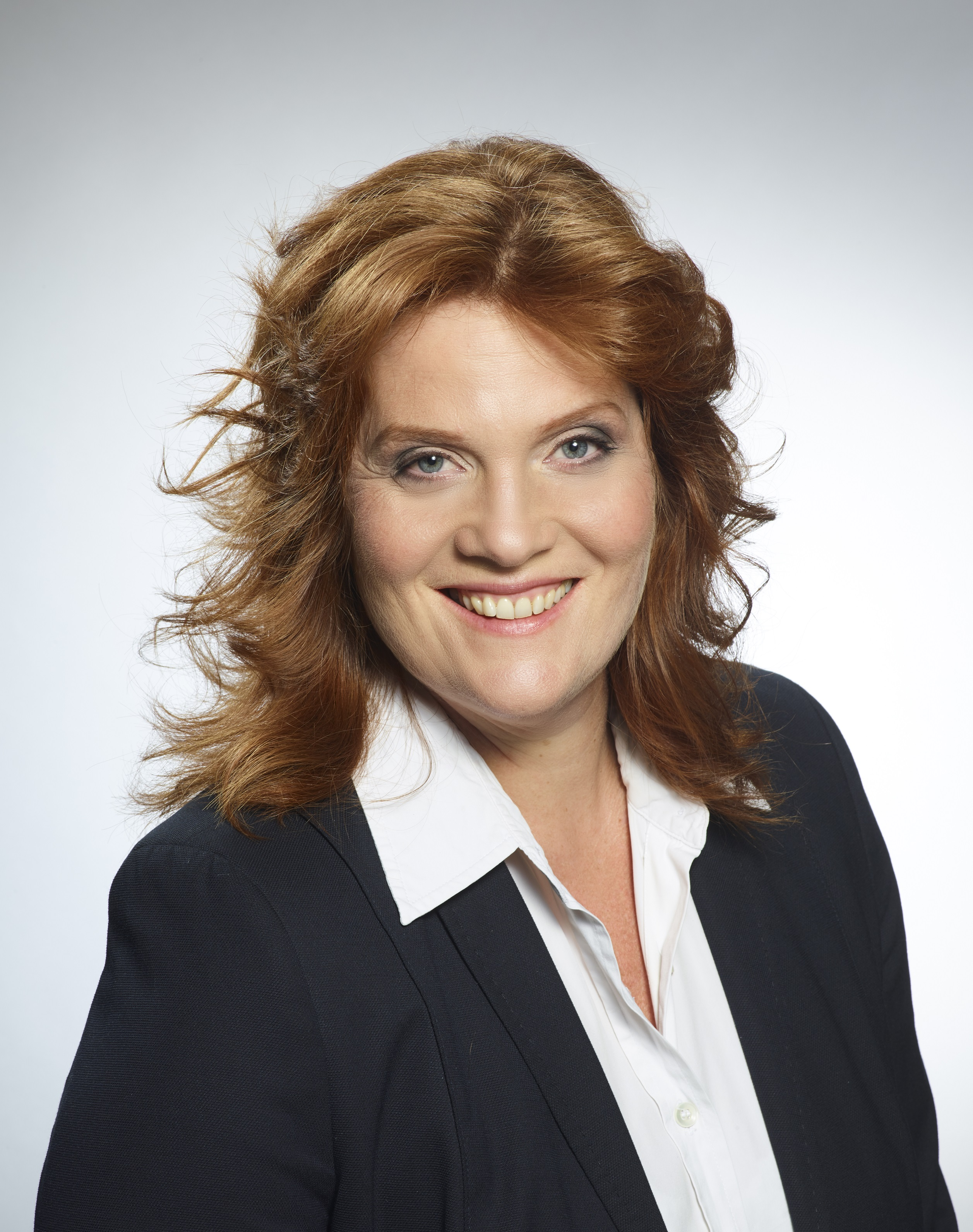
- Sandra Weeser in 2017

Member of the Bundestag
- In office 2017–2025

Personal details
- Born: 8 September 1969 (age 56) Siegen, West Germany
- Party: FDP
- Children: 2

Sandra Weeser (/ˈveɪzər/ VAY-zər; born 8 September 1969) is a German-French politician of the Free Democratic Party (FDP) who served as a member of the Bundestag from the state of Rhineland-Palatinate from 2017 to 2025.

== Early life ==
Born in Siegen, North Rhine-Westphalia, Weeser obtained a degree in business administration in a dual education. She managed a car dealership from 2004 and worked for a major American corporation from 2011 to 2016. She was then Vice President of the Structural and Approval Directorate North in Koblenz.

== Political career ==
Weeser became a member of the Bundestag in the 2017 German federal election. In parliament, she was a member of the Committee on Economic Affairs and Energy from 2017 to 2021 before becoming the chair of the Committee on Housing, Urban Development, Building and Local Government in 2021.

In addition to her committee assignments, Weeser was a member of the German delegation to the Franco-German Parliamentary Assembly from 2019 to 2025.

In the negotiations to form a so-called traffic light coalition of the Social Democratic Party (SPD), the Green Party and the FDP following the 2021 federal elections, Weeser was part of her party's delegation in the working group on climate change and energy policy, co-chaired by Matthias Miersch, Oliver Krischer and Lukas Köhler.

In late 2023, Weeser announced her intention to become one of her party's candidates for the 2024 European elections.
