= Elke Hoff =

German politician

Personal details
- Born: 20 June 1957 (age 68) Unkel, Rhineland-Palatinate, Germany
- Party: Free Democratic Party

Elke Hoff (born 20 June 1957) is a German politician. She was a Free Democratic Party member of the Bundestag.

After taking the Abitur in 1976, Hoff studied German, philosophy and political science at the University of Frankfurt for six semesters. She subsequently trained as a real estate management clerk in 1982. From 1985 to 1991, she worked as a public relations officer for industry federations in the construction and healthcare sectors. She served as a full-time district councillor in Neuwied from 1992 to 2000, and she was responsible for a range of economic and construction portfolios. She left that position to become the head of regional planning in Koblenz.

== Bundestag ==
Hoff was first elected to the Bundestag in the 2005 federal election. She was a member of the Bundestag's defence committee and was her party's alternative member of the subcommittee on disarmament, arms control and non-proliferation.
