= Christian Baldauf =

German politician (born 1967)

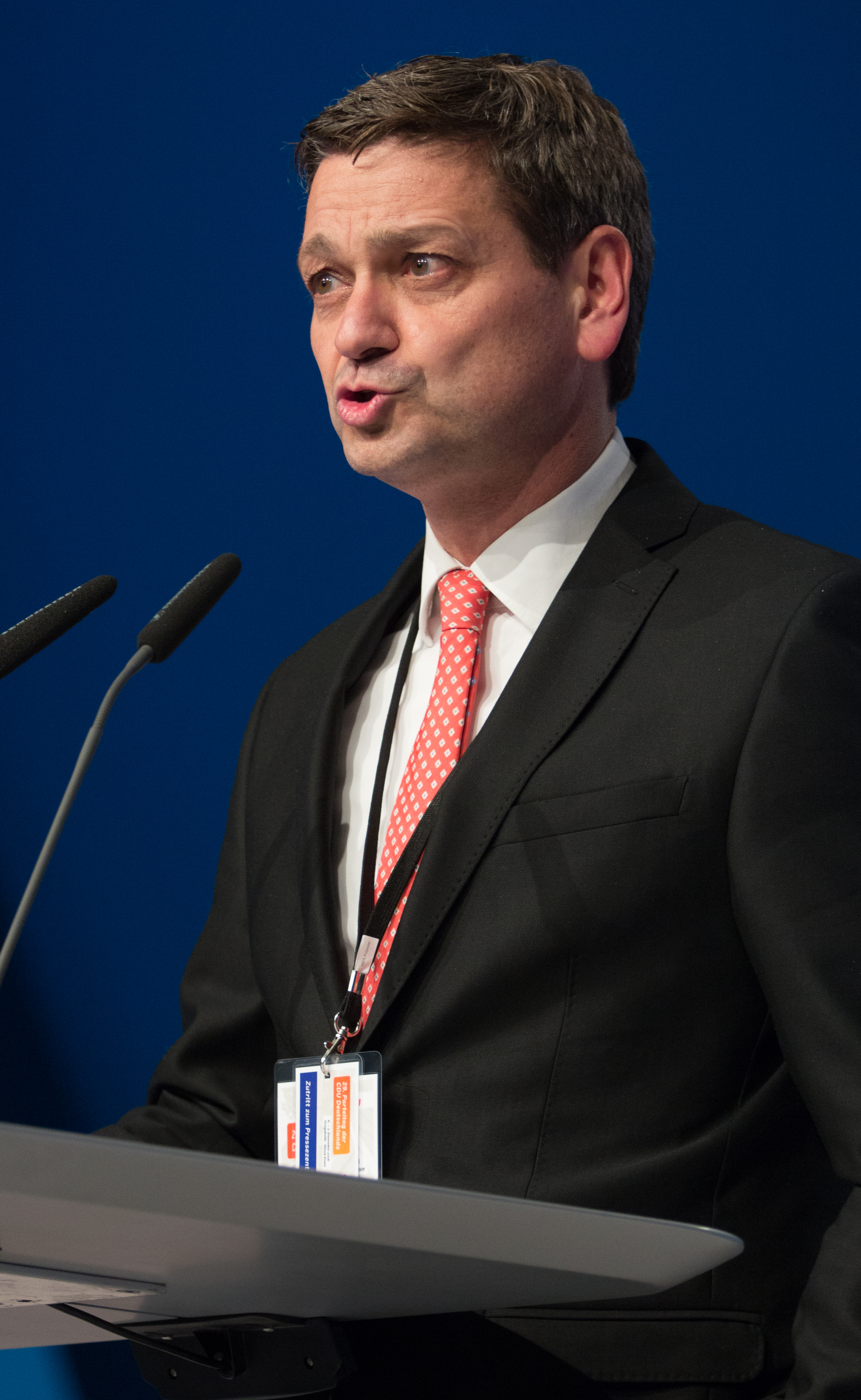
- Baldauf in 2016

Parliamentary Group Chairman
- In office 2006–2011
- Preceded by: Christoph Böhr
- Succeeded by: Julia Klöckner

Chair of the CDU Rhineland-Palatinate
- In office 26 March 2006 – 25 September 2010
- Preceded by: Christoph Böhr
- Succeeded by: Julia Klöckner

Member of the Landtag of Rhineland-Palatinate for Frankenthal
- Incumbent
- Assumed office 18 May 2001
- Preceded by: Dieter Schiffmann

Personal details
- Born: 9 August 1967 (age 59) Frankenthal, West Germany (now Germany)
- Citizenship: German
- Party: CDU
- Children: 2
- Education: University of Mannheim; Heidelberg University
- Occupation: Lawyer
- Website: christianbaldauf.de

Christian Baldauf (born 9 August 1967 in Frankenthal) is a German lawyer and politician of the Christian Democratic Union who served as a member of the Landtag of Rhineland-Palatinate from 2001 to 2026, where he was the leader of the CDU parliamentary group from 2006 2011 and again from 2018 to 2023, making him the leader of the opposition.

Baldauf has been a member of the CDU federal executive committee since November 2006. In November 2019, he was elected as the CDU's top candidate in Rhineland-Palatinate for the 2021 state elections.

== Early life and education ==
Baldauf grew up together with a sister in Frankenthal. After graduating from the Albert-Einstein-Gymnasium in Frankenthal in 1986, he did his military service in Montabaur until 1987, first with the long-distance scouts and later with the topographers. Baldauf then studied law and administration in Mannheim and Heidelberg. In 1991 he passed his 1st State Law Examination and in 1994 his 2nd State Law Examination. During his legal clerkship, he worked at the German University of Administrative Sciences in Speyer, in Neustadt at the then district government, at the court in Frankenthal, at the Higher Regional Court in Zweibrücken, and in a law firm in Frankenthal.

== Early career ==
From 1993 to 1994, Baldauf worked as a research assistant to Maria Böhmer, a member of the German Bundestag. In 1995, he joined the law firm Menzel and Kroll in Frankenthal as a specialist attorney for labor and employment law. In 1999, he became a partner in the Frankenthal law firm Walter, Baldauf, Theobald Rechtsanwälte.

== Political career ==
=== Party ===
Baldauf was inspired by the political turnaround proclaimed by Helmut Kohl and has been a member of the CDU since 1983. From 1992 to 1996, he led the Young Union in the Frankenthal district association as chairman. From 1999 to 2007, he was chairman of the Frankenthal CDU district association. His successor was Sonja Schönherr.

Baldauf has been a member of the Frankenthal city council since 1994 and deputy chairman of the CDU council faction since 2002.

Baldauf was a member of the federal assemblies in 2009, 2010, 2012 and 2017. In the run-up to the 16th federal assembly in 2017, he announced that he would not vote for Frank-Walter Steinmeier.

=== Country Chairman ===
Baldauf was elected state chairman of the CDU in Rhineland-Palatinate in 2006. In September 2008, he was confirmed in office with 98.3%. In the course of the 2011 state elections, Baldauf relinquished the state chairmanship in 2010 in favor of Julia Klöckner, who was the top candidate for the 2011 state elections. He has been deputy state chairman since then.

=== Member of the State Parliament, 2001–2026 ===
Since the state parliament elections in 2001, Baldauf has represented the electoral district of Frankenthal, which includes the city of Frankenthal as well as part of the Rhein-Pfalz district. He was able to defend the constituency in the 2006, 2011 and 2016 elections.

Parliamentary group chairman

From 2006 to 2011, Baldauf was chairman of the state parliamentary group. After the 2011 state election, he left the caucus chairmanship to Julia Klöckner, who was the top candidate, and served as first deputy chairman until spring 2018. After Klöckner became Federal Minister of Food and Agriculture in March 2018 and renounced her mandate in the state parliament, Baldauf has again been chairman of the state parliamentary group since 16 March 2018 and is thus also the leader of the opposition in the state parliament. He is a member of the CDU/CSU parliamentary group conference.

Committee work

Baldauf has been a regular member of the Council of Elders, Budget and Finance Committee, and the Interim Committee in the 17th legislative period of the state parliament since 2016. In previous legislative periods, Baldauf was a member of the Committee for Justice and Consumer Protection, Committee for the Economy, Climate Protection, Energy and State Planning, Committee for Social Affairs, Labor, Health and Demography, and the Data Protection Commission, among others.

He was a member of the Rodalben investigative committee, which looked into the background and responsibilities surrounding the death of a kindergarten teacher at the Rodalben youth center. A 26-year-old female professional had been killed by knife wounds during the escape of three youths in November 2003. In the committee of inquiry, accusations were made against the then Minister of Social Affairs, Malu Dreyer. Baldauf was the chairman of his parliamentary group in the investigative committee on the Nürburgring affair. There, the affair of the failed private financing of a leisure park at the Ring, in which the state lost more than €500 million and in connection with which Finance Minister Ingolf Deubel had to resign in July 2009, was dealt with. Deubel was later sentenced to imprisonment by the Koblenz Regional Court for breach of trust and making false statements under oath to the investigative committee and had to serve his prison term in 2020.

In June 2019, Baldauf was proposed by the state executive board as the top candidate for the 2021 state elections.

== Other activities ==
Baldauf is involved in numerous sports and carnival clubs in Frankenthal and is a member of the Mainz Ranzengarde. He is a member of the Frankenthal animal shelter, the Frankenthal women's shelter "Frauen für Frauen" (Women for Women), and a member of the advisory board of the regional organizations of Johanniter and Malteser. He is a member of the Lions Club. Baldauf has been a season ticket holder at 1. FC Kaiserslautern since 1987.

== Personal life ==
Baldauf has been married since 1997, has two children and lives in Frankenthal.

Party political offices
Preceded by Dieter Schiffmann	Member of the Landtag of Rhineland-Palatinate for Frankenthal; 2001–present	Incumbent
