= Antje Lezius =

German politician

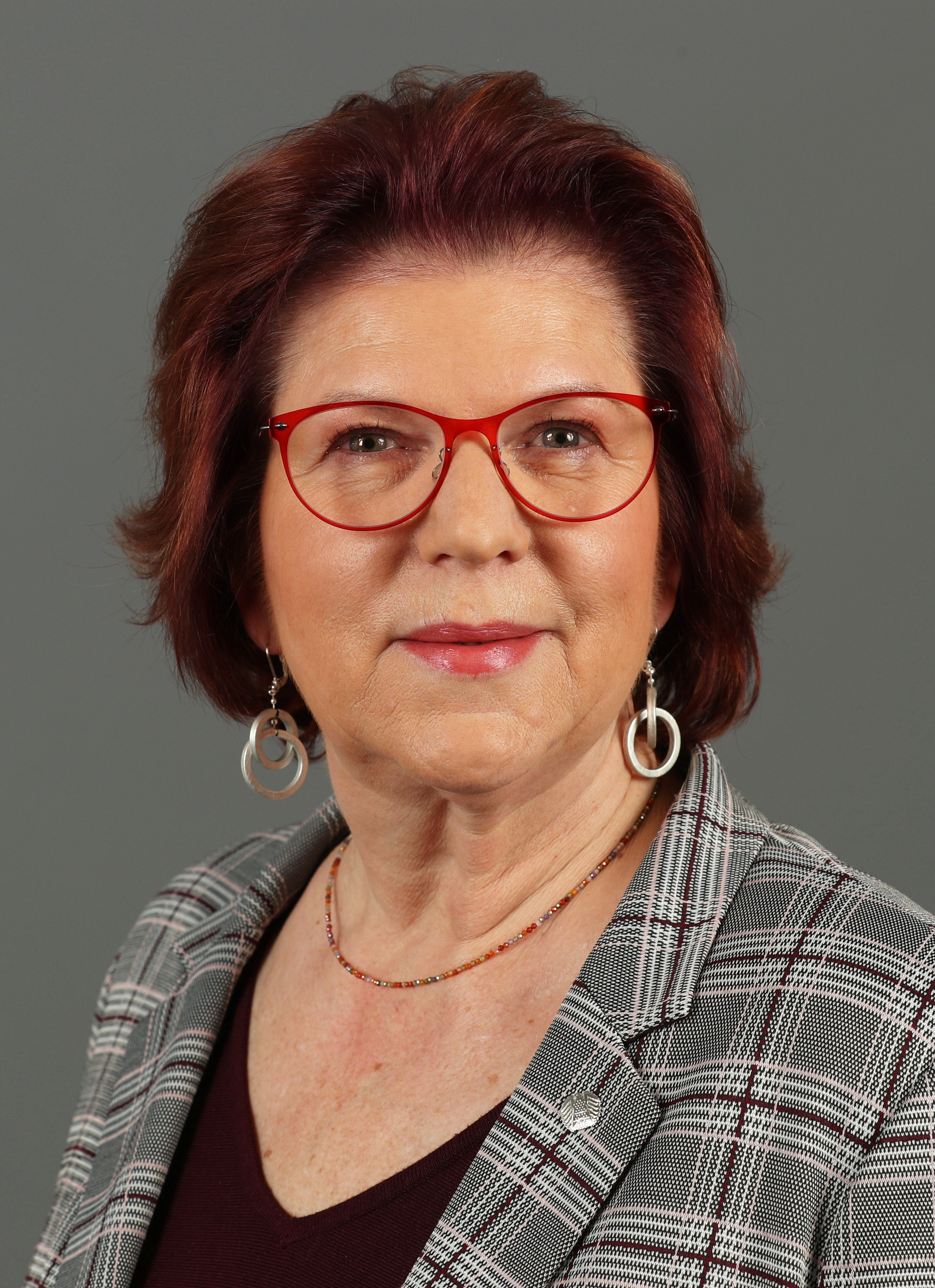
- Antje Lezius in 2020

Member of the Bundestag
- In office 2013–2021

Personal details
- Born: 30 June 1960 (age 65) Kusel, West Germany (now Germany)
- Party: CDU

Antje Lezius (born 30 June 1960) is a German politician. Born in Kusel, Rhineland-Palatinate, she represents the CDU. Antje Lezius has served as a member of the Bundestag from the state of Rhineland-Palatinate from 2013 to 2021.

== Life ==
She became member of the bundestag after the 2013 German federal election. She is a member of the Committee for Labour and Social Affairs.
