= Fritz Rudolf Körper =

German politician (born 1954)

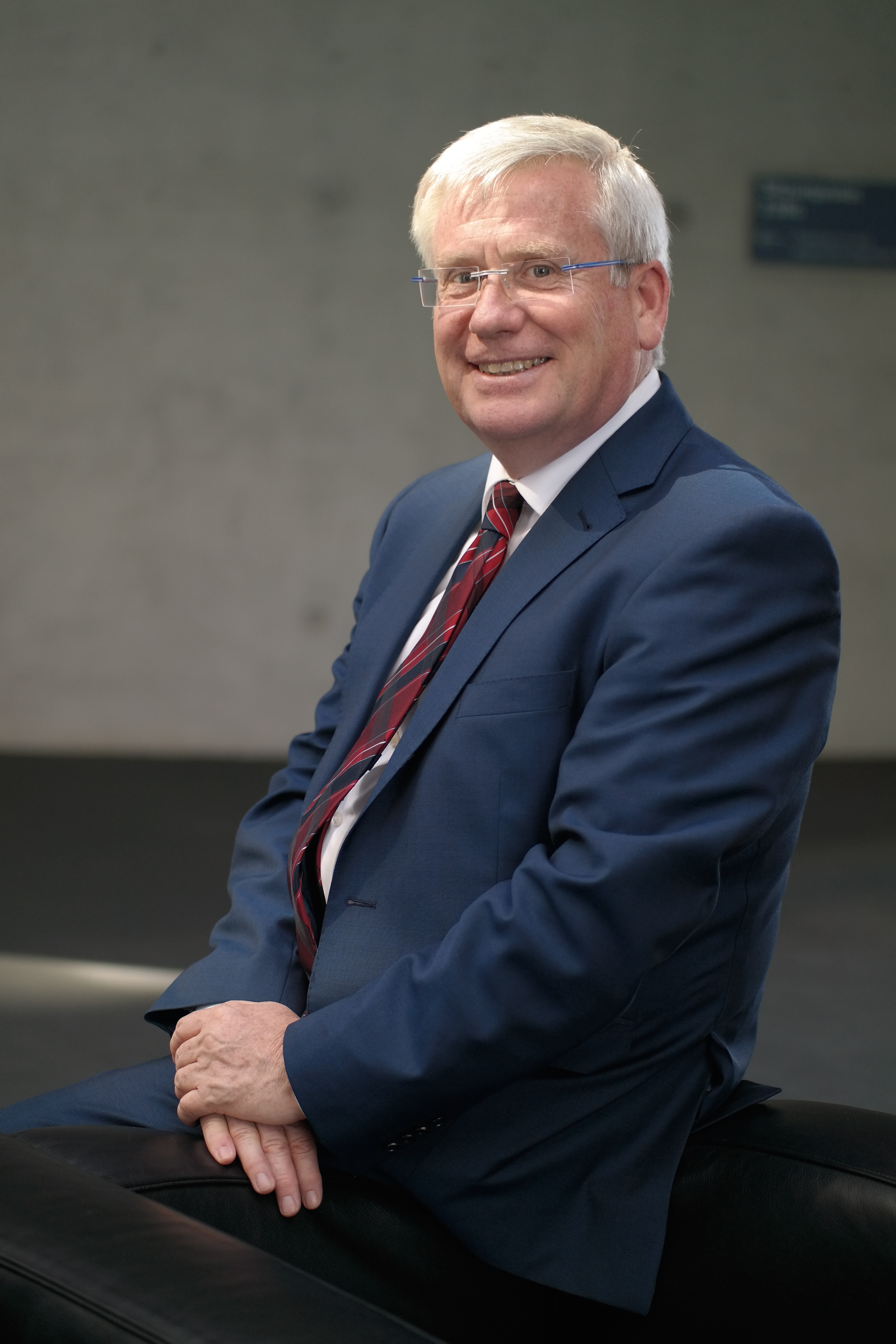

Member of the Bundestag
- In office 1990–2013

Deputy Chairman of the SPD Parliamentary Group in the German Bundestag
- In office 2005–2009

Parliamentary State Secretary to the Federal Minister of the Interior
- In office 1998–2005

Personal details
- Born: 14 November 1954 (age 71) Rehborn, Rhineland-Palatinate, Germany
- Party: Social Democratic Party of Germany (SPD)
- Education: Johannes Gutenberg University Mainz
- Awards: Order of Merit of the Federal Republic of Germany (Cross of Merit, 1. Class)

Fritz Rudolf Körper (14 November 1954 in Rehborn) is a German politician and member of the Social Democratic Party of Germany (SPD). He was a member of the German Bundestag from 1990 to 2013, parliamentary state secretary to the Federal Minister of the Interior from 1998 to 2005 and Deputy Chairman of the SPD parliamentary group from 2005 to 2009.

== Education ==
After graduating from high school in 1974, Körper studied Protestant theology at the Johannes Gutenberg University in Mainz, which he completed in 1982 with the theological examination at the Evangelical Church of the Palatinate.

== Political career ==
Fritz Rudolf Körper has been a member of the Social Democratic Party of Germany (SPD) since 1973. From 1990 to 2010, he was chairman of the Bad Kreuznach SPD district association, and from 1990 to 2013 he was deputy chairman of the Rhineland SPD regional association.

He was an elected member of the Bundestag from 1990 and remained in office until 2013. Here, he held the position of domestic policy spokesman for the SPD parliamentary group from 1994 to 1998. From 1998 to 2005, Körper was parliamentary state secretary to the Federal Minister of the Interior Otto Schily.

From 28 November 2005 to October 2009 Körper was deputy chairman of the SPD parliamentary group for domestic policy, law, sports, culture and media, and rules of procedure. From the beginning of the 17th parliamentary term (2009-2013), he was a member of the Defense Committee. He also served eight years on the Parliamentary Oversight Panel, which monitors the work of the Federal Intelligence Service (BND), the Federal Office for the Protection of the Constitution (BfV), and the Military Counter-Intelligence Service (MAD).

Körper had entered the Bundestag in the 2005 and 2009 federal elections via the state list of Rhineland-Palatinate and before that always as a directly elected member of the Bundestag for the constituency of Kreuznach. In the 2013 Bundestag election, he ran again for the constituency as well as in 12th place on the state list, but was unable to win a Bundestag mandate again.

Since 1 January 2014 he has led and managed an international firm based in Berlin, Brussels and Mainz, which, among other things, represents the political interests of companies and advises and supports its clients in business development.

== Awards ==
- 2006: Badge of Honor of the German Federal Agency for Technical Relief in Gold
- 2009: Order of Merit of the Federal Republic of Germany, Cross of Merit 1. Class
- 2014: German Fire Brigade Cross of Honor in Silver of the DFV
