= List of members of the Rhineland-Palatinate Landtag =

1. Dr. Walter Altherr, CDU
2. Peter Anheuser, CDU
3. Christian Johannes Baldauf, CDU
4. Hans-Artur Bauckhage, FDP
5. Christine Baumann, SPD
6. Kurt Beck, SPD
7. Michael Billen, CDU
8. Franz Josef Bischel, CDU
9. Christoph Böhr, CDU
10. Hans-Josef Bracht, CDU
11. Dr. Bernhard Braun, BÜNDNIS 90/DIE GRÜNEN
12. Ulla Brede-Hoffmann, SPD
13. Brinkmann, Ernst-Günter SPD
14. Burgard, Dieter SPD
15. Creutzmann, Jürgen FDP
16. Dröscher, Peter Wilhelm SPD
17. Ebli, Friederike SPD
18. Elsner, Petra SPD
19. Enders, Dr. Peter CDU
20. Ernst, Guido Karl CDU
21. Fink, Monika SPD
22. Franzmann, Rudolf SPD
23. Frisch, Lutz CDU
24. Fuhr, Alexander SPD
25. Gebhart, Dr. Thomas CDU
26. Geis, Manfred SPD
27. Geisen, Dr. Edmund FDP
28. Gölter, Dr. Georg CDU
29. Christoph Grimm, SPD
30. Marianne Grosse, SPD
31. Friedel Grützmacher, BÜNDNIS 90/DIE GRÜNEN
32. Helga Hammer, CDU
33. Klaus Hammer, SPD
34. Hartloff, Jochen SPD
35. Heinrich, Heribert SPD
36. Hohn, Reinhold FDP
37. Hörter, Michael CDU
38. Huth-Haage, Simone CDU
39. Itzek, Gerd SPD
40. Jullien, Herbert CDU
41. Keller, Josef CDU
42. Elke Kiltz, BÜNDNIS 90/DIE GRÜNEN
43. Kipp, Anne SPD
44. Klamm, Hannelore SPD
45. Klöckner, Dieter SPD
46. Kohnle-Gros, Marlies CDU
47. Werner Kuhn, FDP
48. Matthias Lammert, CDU
49. Lelle, Erhard CDU
50. Leppla, Ruth SPD
51. Lewentz, Roger SPD
52. Licht, Alexander CDU
53. Mangold-Wegner, Sigrid SPD
54. Reiner Marz, BÜNDNIS 90/DIE GRÜNEN
55. Joachim Mertes, SPD
56. Herbert Mertin, FDP
57. Elfriede Meurer, CDU
58. Gernot Mittler, SPD
59. Norbert Mittrücker, CDU
60. Margit Mohr, SPD
61. Nicole Morsblech, FDP
62. Manfred Nink, SPD
63. Hans Jürgen Noss, SPD
64. Renate Pepper, SPD
65. Pörksen, Carsten SPD
66. Presl, Fritz SPD
67. Puchtler, Frank, SPD
68. Raab, Heike, SPD
69. Ramsauer, Günther, SPD
70. Reich, Beate, SPD
71. Remy, Sigurd, SPD
72. Rösch, Günter, SPD
73. Rosenbauer, Dr. Josef, CDU
74. Rüddel, Erwin, CDU
75. Schäfer, Dorothea CDU
76. Schiffmann, Dr. Dieter SPD
77. Schleicher-Rothmund, Barbara SPD
78. Schmidt, Dr. Gerhard SPD
79. Schmidt, Ulla CDU
80. Schmitt, Astrid SPD
81. Schmitt, Dieter CDU
82. Schmitz, Dr. Peter FDP
83. Schnabel, Heinz-Hermann CDU
84. Schneider, Christine CDU
85. Schneider-Forst, Angela Maria CDU
86. Schneiders, Herbert CDU
87. Schreiner, Gerd CDU
88. Schwarz, Franz SPD
89. Schweitzer, Harald SPD
90. Seiler, Ulrich SPD
91. Siegrist, Hildrun SPD
92. Spurzem, Anne SPD
93. Stretz, Norbert SPD
94. Thelen, Hedi CDU
95. Ise Thomas, BÜNDNIS 90/DIE GRÜNEN
96. Dr. Adolf Weiland, CDU
97. Mathilde Weinandy, CDU
98. Thomas Weiner, CDU
99. Nils Wiechmann, BÜNDNIS 90/DIE GRÜNEN
100. Walter Wirz, CDU
101. F. Walter Zuber, SPD

== See also ==
- Landtag of Rhineland-Palatinate
