= 2016 Rhineland-Palatinate state election =

German state election

- 13 March 2016

All 101 seats in the Landtag of Rhineland-Palatinate 51 seats needed for a majority
- Turnout: 2,130,621 (70.4%) ▲8.6%
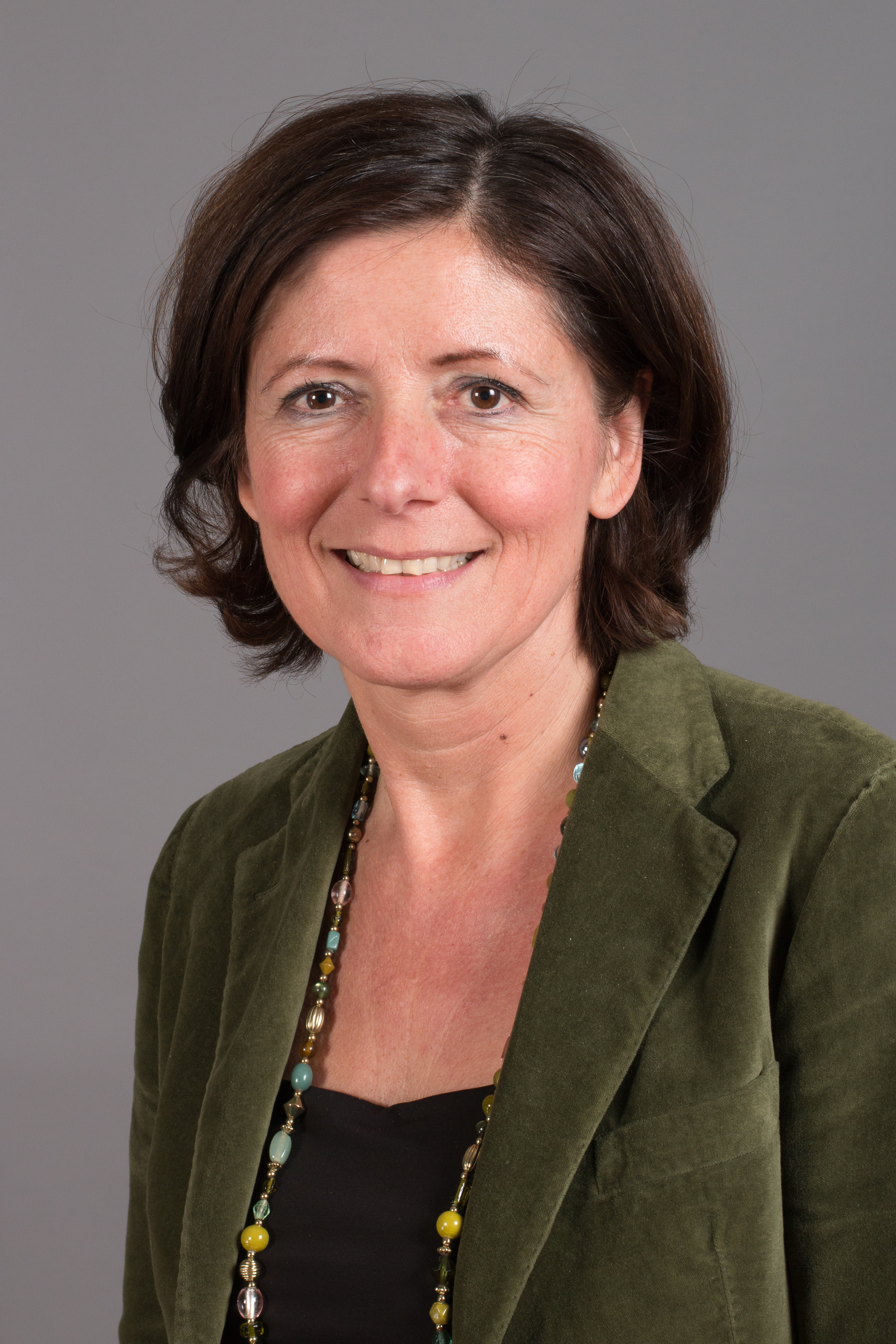

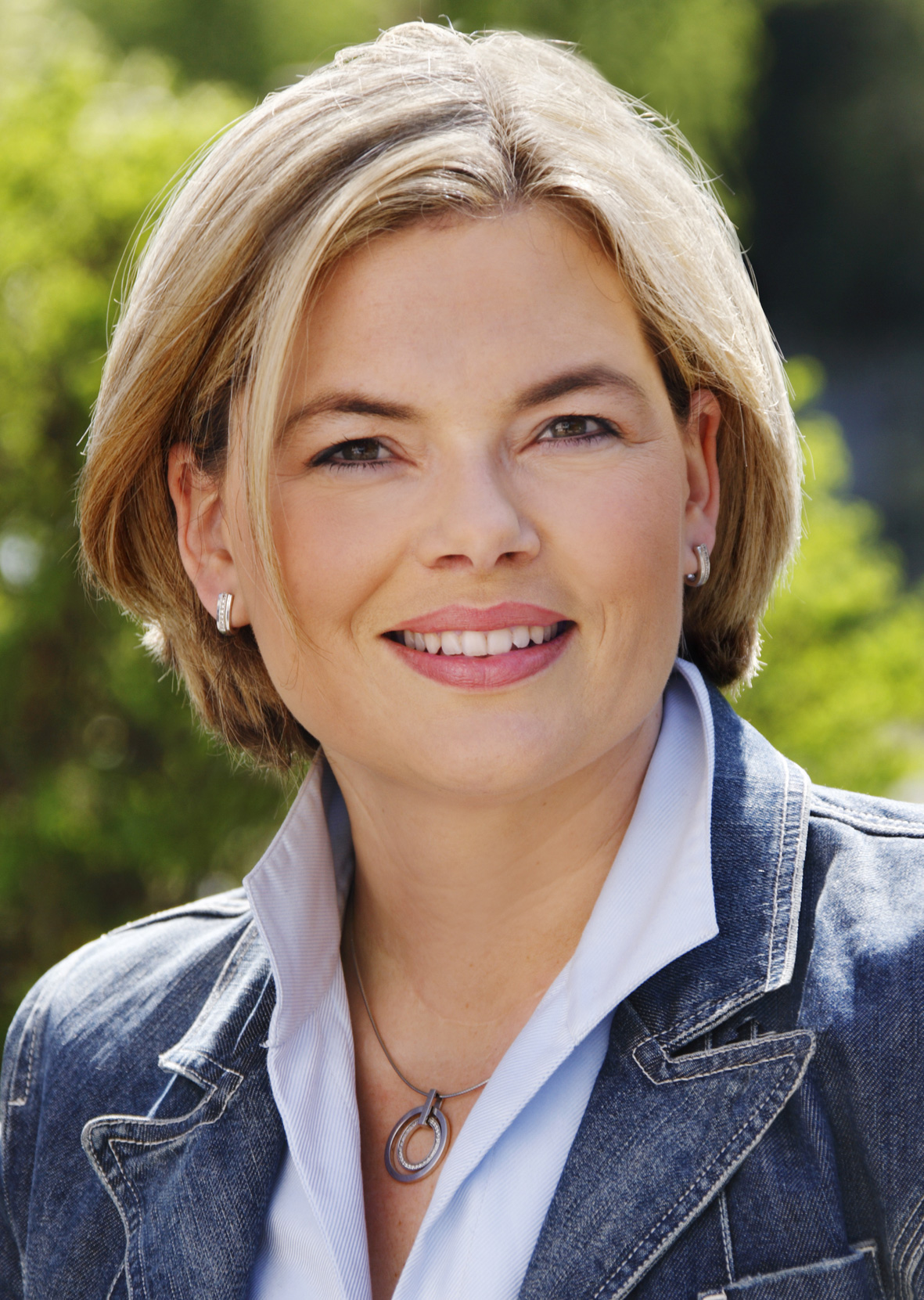

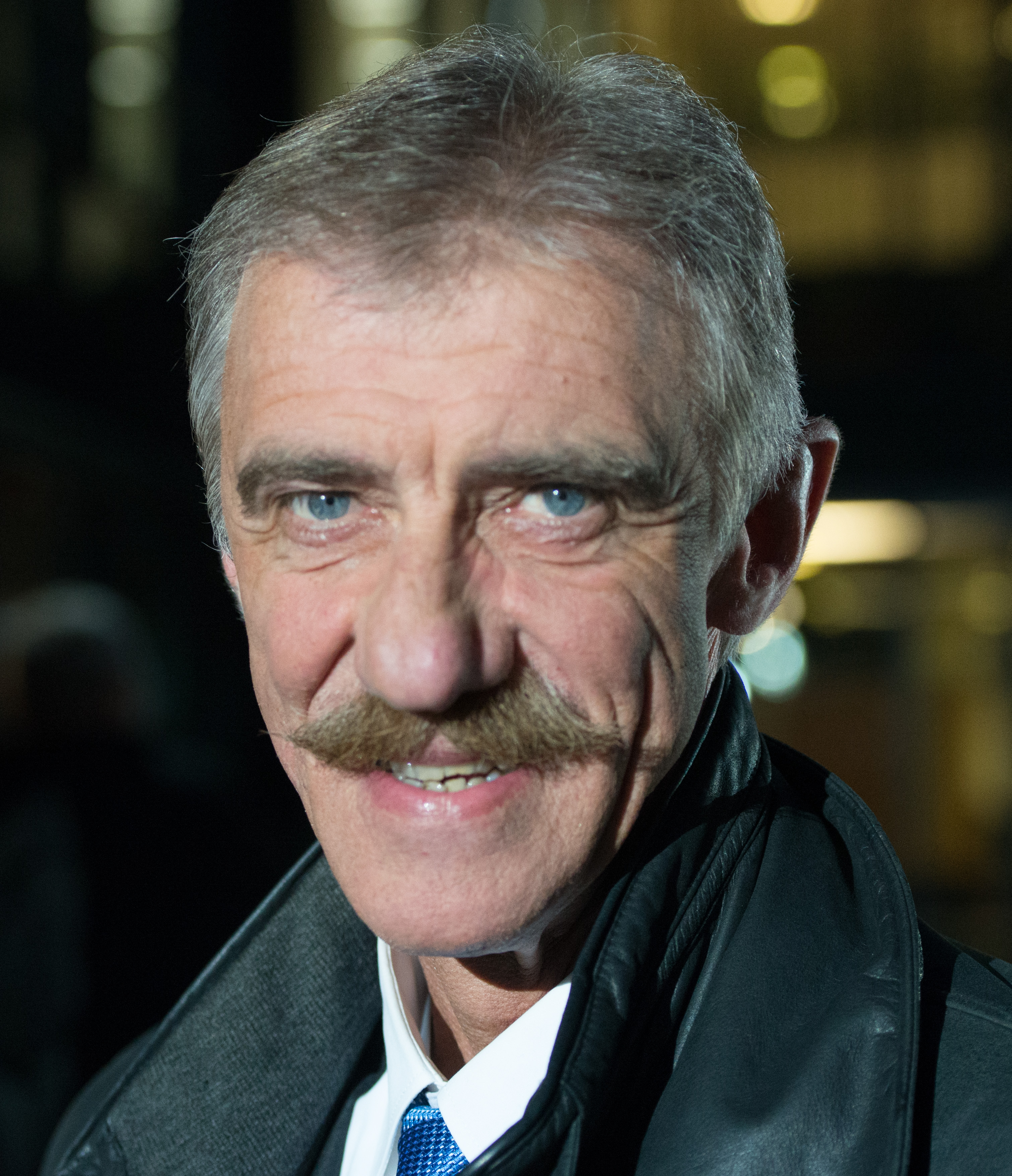

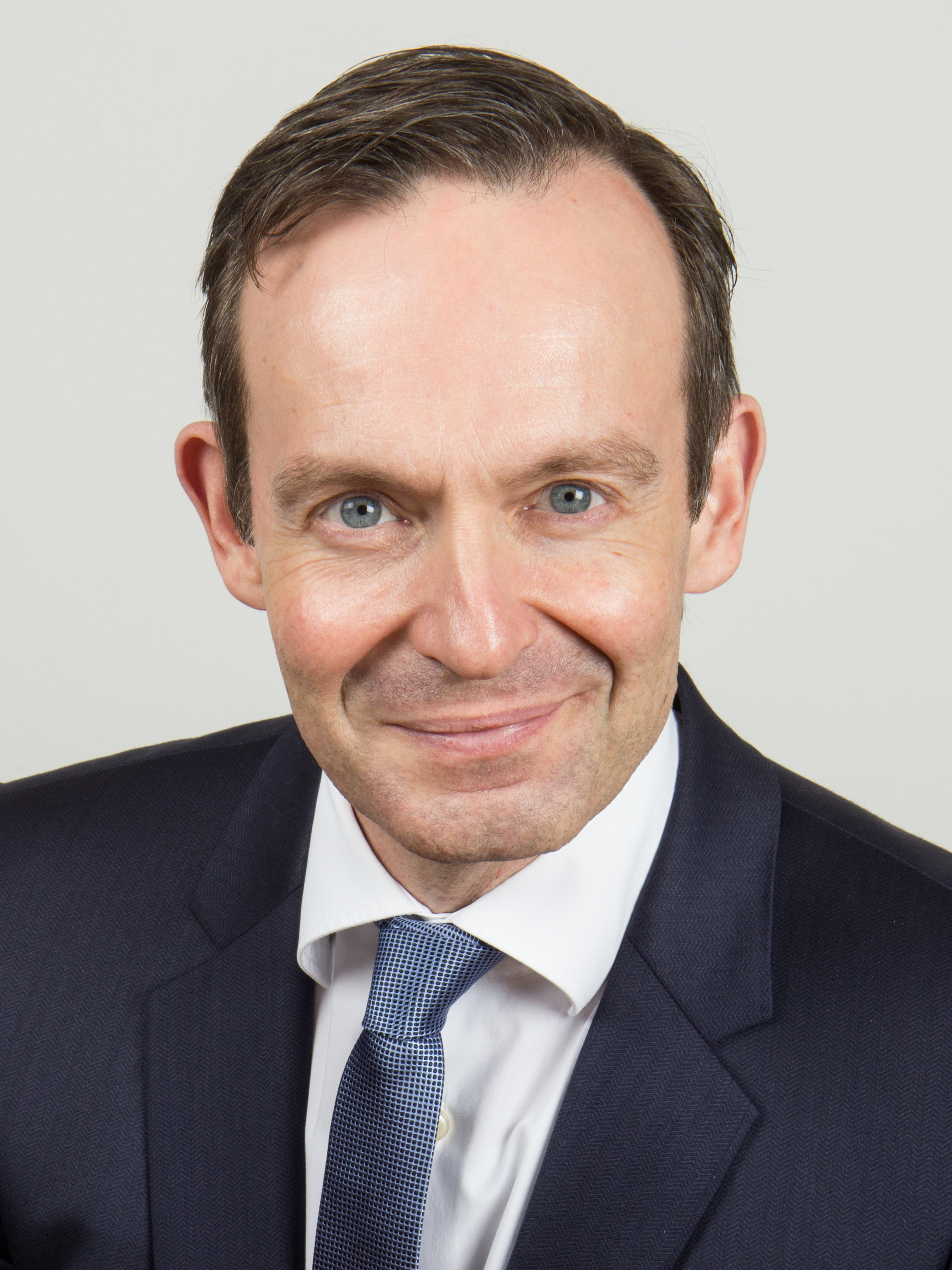

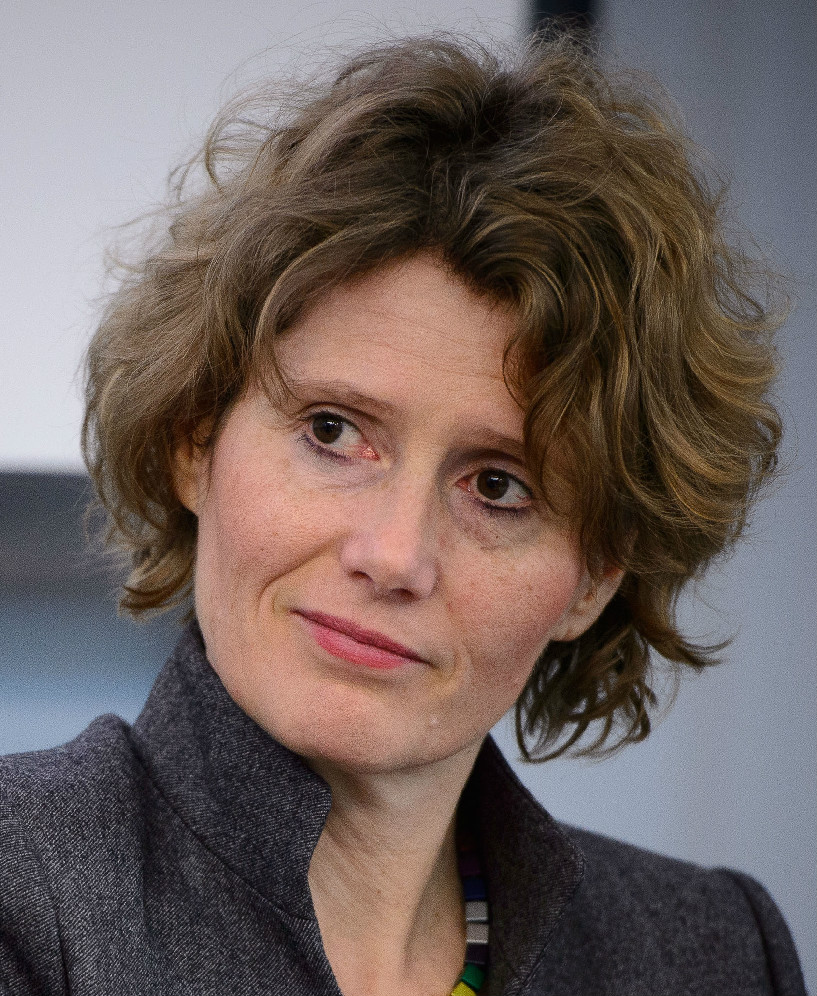
	First party	Second party	Third party
Leader	Malu Dreyer	Julia Klöckner	Uwe Junge
Party	SPD	CDU	AfD
Last election	42 seats, 35.7%	41 seats, 35.2%	Did not exist
Seats won	39	35	14
Seat change	▼3	▼6	▲14
Popular vote	771,848	677,507	268,628
Percentage	36.2%	31.8%	12.6%
Swing	▲0.5%	▼3.4%	New party
	Fourth party	Fifth party
Leader	Volker Wissing	Eveline Lemke
Party	FDP	Greens
Last election	0 seats, 4.2%	18 seats, 15.4%
Seats won	7	6
Seat change	▲7	▼12
Popular vote	132,294	113,261
Percentage	6.2%	5.3%
Swing	▲2.0%	▼10.1%
- Results for the single-member constituencies
Government before election
First Dreyer cabinet
SPD–Green
Government after election
Second Dreyer cabinet
SPD–FDP–Green

The 2016 Rhineland-Palatinate state election to elect the members of the Landtag of Rhineland-Palatinate was held on 13 March 2016, the same day as the Baden-Württemberg state election and Saxony-Anhalt state election. The incumbent coalition government of the Social Democratic Party (SPD) and The Greens led by Minister-President Malu Dreyer was defeated due to severe losses by the Greens, dropping to 5th largest party and nearly losing representation. To ensure a majority government with the Greens, the SPD (political color: red) and Greens carried on as a "traffic light coalition" with support from the Free Democratic Party (FDP, political color: yellow). Dreyer was subsequently re-elected as Minister-President.

Following the 2015 European migrant crisis, the Alternative for Germany (AfD) debuted as third largest party, but at 12.6% not as strong as in the other two state elections.

== Parties ==
The table below lists parties represented in the previous Landtag of Rhineland-Palatinate.

Name		Ideology	Leader(s)	2011 result	
Name		Ideology	Leader(s)	Votes (%)	Seats
SPD	Social Democratic Party of Germany; Sozialdemokratische Partei Deutschlands	Social democracy	Malu Dreyer	35.7%	42 / 101
CDU	Christian Democratic Union of Germany; Christlich Demokratische Union Deutschlands	Christian democracy	Julia Klöckner	35.2%	41 / 101
Grüne	Alliance 90/The Greens; Bündnis 90/Die Grünen	Green politics	Eveline Lemke	15.4%	18 / 101

== Opinion polling ==
Polling firm	Fieldwork date	Sample size	SPD	CDU	Grüne	FDP	Linke	Piraten	AfD	Others	Lead
2016 state election	13 Mar 2016	–	36.2	31.8	5.3	6.2	2.8	0.8	12.6	4.2	4.4
Forschungsgruppe Wahlen	7–10 Mar 2016	1,693	36	35	5.5	7	3	–	9	4.5	1
YouGov	2–9 Mar 2016	1,003	35	36	6	6	4	–	11	2	1
Forsa	2–8 Mar 2016	1,002	35	35	6	6	4	–	9	5	Tie
INSA	1–5 Mar 2016	1,000	35	35	7	5	3	–	9	6	Tie
Forschungsgruppe Wahlen	29 Feb–3 Mar 2016	1,011	34	35	6	6	4	–	10	5	1
Infratest dimap	1–2 Mar 2016	1,004	34	36	7	5	4	–	9	5	2
Infratest dimap	24–27 Feb 2016	1,000	32	36	8	6	4	–	9	5	4
INSA	25–27 Feb 2016	1,001	32.5	35	10	6	4	–	8.5	4	2.5
INSA	19–20 Feb 2016	1,032	33	35	9	7	4	–	8.5	3.5	2
GESS Phone & Field	12–20 Feb 2016	1,002	33	37	8	5	3	–	9	5	4
Infratest dimap	4–9 Feb 2016	1,000	31	37	8	6	4	–	9	5	6
INSA	26 Jan–1 Feb 2016	1,000	32	36	10	6	3	–	8	5	4
Forschungsgruppe Wahlen	19–21 Jan 2016	1,034	31	38	7	5	5	–	9	5	7
Infratest dimap	6–11 Jan 2016	1,001	31	37	9	5	5	–	8	5	6
Infratest dimap	3–7 Dec 2015	1,000	31	39	9	5	5	–	7	4	8
INSA	17–24 Nov 2015	1,003	31.0	38.5	11.0	4.5	3.5	–	7.0	4.5	7.5
GESS Phone & Field	6–16 Nov 2015	1,002	33	40	9	5	3	–	5	5	7
Forschungsgruppe Wahlen	2–4 Nov 2015	1,093	30	41	8	4	5	–	6	6	11
Infratest dimap	17–21 Sep 2015	1,005	31	41	10	5	5	–	4	4	10
Infratest dimap	17–21 Jul 2015	1,001	33	42	10	4	3	–	3	5	9
GESS Phone & Field	12–22 Jun 2015	1,003	33	40	11	4	3	–	4	5	7
Infratest dimap	11–15 Feb 2015	1,000	32	42	11	3	3	–	5	4	10
GESS Phone & Field	5–15 Dec 2014	1,002	30	43	10	3	4	1	5	4	13
Infratest dimap	7–10 Nov 2014	1,000	31	43	11	2	4	–	5	4	12
Infratest dimap	19–22 Sep 2014	1,000	31	43	10	2	4	–	6	4	12
GESS Phone & Field	13–21 Jun 2014	1,002	32	41	10	3	4	–	4	6	9
Infratest dimap	2–5 May 2014	1,001	31	41	11	3	4	–	4	6	10
Infratest dimap	28–31 Mar 2014	1,000	33	41	11	3	4	–	3	5	8
Infratest dimap	9–10 Dec 2013	1,000	35	40	9	4	4	–	4	4	5
GESS Phone & Field	29 Nov–6 Dec 2013	1,005	32	43	9	4	4	2	2	4	11
Infratest dimap	29 Aug–2 Sep 2013	1,000	34	43	10	3	2	3	3	2	9
GESS Phone & Field	3–13 May 2013	1,003	35	39	12	3	3	3	1	4	4
Infratest dimap	18–21 Apr 2013	1,000	34	43	12	2	2	2	2	3	9
Infratest dimap	11–14 Jan 2013	1,000	33	43	13	2	3	3	–	3	10
GESS Phone & Field	7–12 Jan 2013	2,007	35	40	11	3	2	4	–	5	5
GESS Phone & Field	8–13 Oct 2012	1,004	36	36	13	3	2	3	–	?	Tie
Infratest dimap	8–9 Oct 2012	1,000	36	40	12	3	2	3	–	4	4
Infratest dimap	24–27 Aug 2012	1,000	32	39	15	3	2	5	–	4	7
Infratest dimap	23–24 Jul 2012	1,003	31	37	16	3	3	5	–	5	6
GESS Phone & Field	16–22 Jun 2012	1,005	37	35	14	4	2	5	–	3	2
Infratest dimap	4–7 May 2012	1,000	36	36	14	3	3	6	–	2	Tie
Infratest dimap	23–27 Mar 2012	1,000	36	37	15	2	3	5	–	2	1
GESS Phone & Field	12–17 Mar 2012	1,003	36	36	15	3	2	4	–	?	Tie
GESS Phone & Field	1–9 Dec 2011	1,003	37	35	16	3	2	4	–	?	2
Infratest dimap	2–5 Dec 2011	1,000	37	37	15	3	2	4	–	2	Tie
GESS Phone & Field	16–22 Sep 2011	1,004	38	34	17	2	2	3	–	?	4
Infratest dimap	19–20 Sep 2011	1,000	39	34	16	2	3	3	–	3	5
Psephos	14–17 Jun 2011	1,004	34	38	15	3	3	–	–	7	4
2011 state election	27 Mar 2011	–	35.7	35.2	15.4	4.2	3.0	1.6	–	4.8	0.5

== Results ==
< 2011 2021 >

Results for the 13 March 2016 election to the 17th Landtag of Rhineland-Palatinate
Party	Popular vote			Seats	
Party	Votes	%	+/–	Seats	+/–
Social Democratic Party; Sozialdemokratische Partei Deutschlands – SPD	771,848	36.2	▲0.5	39	▼3
Christian Democratic Union; Christlich Demokratische Union Deutschlands – CDU	677,507	31.8	▼3.4	35	▼6
Alternative for Germany; Alternative für Deutschland – AfD	268,628	12.6	▲12.6	14	▲14
Free Democratic Party; Freie Demokratische Partei – FDP	132,294	6.2	▲2.0	7	▲7
Alliance '90/The Greens; Bündnis 90/Die Grünen	113,261	5.3	▼10.1	6	▼12
The Left; Die Linke	59,970	2.8	▼0.2	–	–
Free Voters Rhineland-Palatinate; Freie Wähler	47,924	2.2	▼0.1	–	–
Pirate Party; Piratenpartei	16,708	0.8	▼0.8	–	–
Alliance for Progress and Renewal; Allianz für Fortschritt und Aufbruch – ALFA	13,154	0.6	▲0.6	–	–
National Democratic Party; Nationaldemokratische Partei Deutschlands – NPD	10,565	0.5	▼0.6	–	–
Ecological Democratic Party; Ökologisch-Demokratische Partei – ÖDP	8,623	0.4	Steady	–	–
The Republicans; Die Republikaner – REP	5,090	0.2	Steady	–	–
The Unity; Die Einheit	3,105	0.1	▲0.1	–	–
The Third Way; Der III. Weg	1,944	0.1	▲0.1	–	–
Other parties	–	–	–	–	–
Valid votes	2,130,621	98.6	▲0.7		
Invalid votes	30,885	1.4	▼0.7		
Totals and voter turnout	2,161,506	70.4	▲8.6	101	–
Electorate	3,071,972	100.0	—		
Source: Landeswahlleiter
