= First Dreyer cabinet =

State government of Rhineland-Palatinate

First Cabinet of Malu Dreyer Dreyer I
- 23rd Cabinet of Rhineland-Palatinate
- 16 January 2013 – 18 May 2016
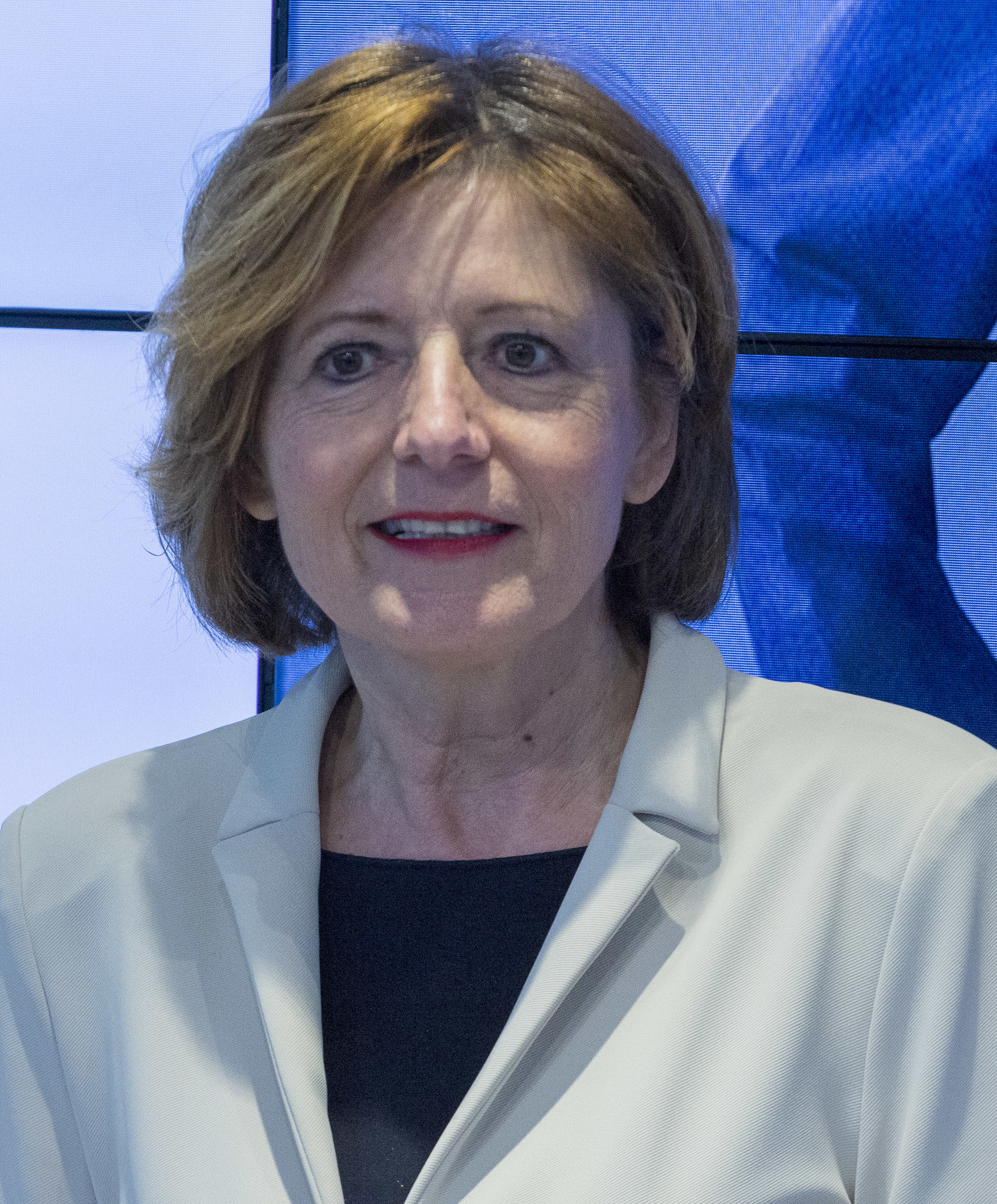
- Malu Dreyer in March 2021
- Date formed: 16 January 2013
- Date dissolved: 18 May 2016

People and organisations
- Minister-President: Malu Dreyer
- Deputy Minister-President: Eveline Lemke
- No. of ministers: 10
- Member parties: Social Democratic Party; Alliance 90/The Greens
- Status in legislature: Majority (Coalition)
- Opposition parties: Christian Democratic Union

History
- Election: 2011 Rhineland-Palatinate state election
- Legislature term: 16th Landtag of Rhineland-Palatinate
- Predecessor: Beck V
- Successor: Dreyer II

The First Dreyer cabinet was the state government of the German state of Rhineland-Palatinate from 16 January 2013 until 18 May 2016. The Cabinet was headed by Minister President Malu Dreyer and was formed by the SPD and the Greens, after the resignation of minister president Kurt Beck. On 16 January 2013 Dreyer was elected and sworn in as Minister President by the Landtag of Rhineland-Palatinate. Dreyer's first cabinet was succeeded by her Second cabinet following the 2016 state election.

The cabinet comprised 10 ministers including the Minister-President: seven from the SPD, and three from the Greens.

== Composition ==
Cabinet members
Portfolio	Minister	Took office	Left office	Party
Minister President	Malu Dreyer	16 January 2013	18 May 2016	SPD
Deputy Minister President & Minister for Economic Affairs, Climate Protection, Energy and Regional Planning	Eveline Lemke	16 January 2013	18 May 2016	Greens
Minister of the Interior, Sport and Infrastructure	Roger Lewentz	16 January 2013	18 May 2016	SPD
Minister of Finance	Carsten Kühl	16 January 2013	12 November 2014	SPD
Minister of Finance	Doris Ahnen	12 November 2014	18 May 2016	SPD
Minister of Justice and Consumer Protection	Jochen Hartloff	16 January 2013	12 November 2014	SPD
Minister of Justice and Consumer Protection	Gerhard Robbers	12 November 2014	18 May 2016	SPD
Minister for Social Affairs, Labour, Health and Demography	Alexander Schweitzer	16 January 2013	12 November 2014	SPD
Minister for Social Affairs, Labour, Health and Demography	Gerhard Robbers	12 November 2014	18 May 2016	SPD
Minister for Education, Science, Further Education and Culture	Doris Ahnen	16 January 2013	12 November 2014	SPD
Minister for Education, Science, Further Education and Culture	Vera Reiß	12 November 2014	18 May 2016	SPD
Minister for Integration, Family, Children, Youth and Women	Irene Alt	16 January 2013	18 May 2016	Greens
Minister of Environment, Agriculture, Food, Viticulture and Forestry	Ulrike Höfken	16 January 2013	18 May 2016	Greens
Minister of State for Federal and European Affairs	Margit Conrad	16 January 2013	12 November 2014	SPD
