= 2011 Rhineland-Palatinate state election =

German state election

- 27 March 2011

All 101 seats of the Landtag of Rhineland-Palatinate 51 seats needed for a majority
- Turnout: 1,868,187 (61.8%) ▲3.2%
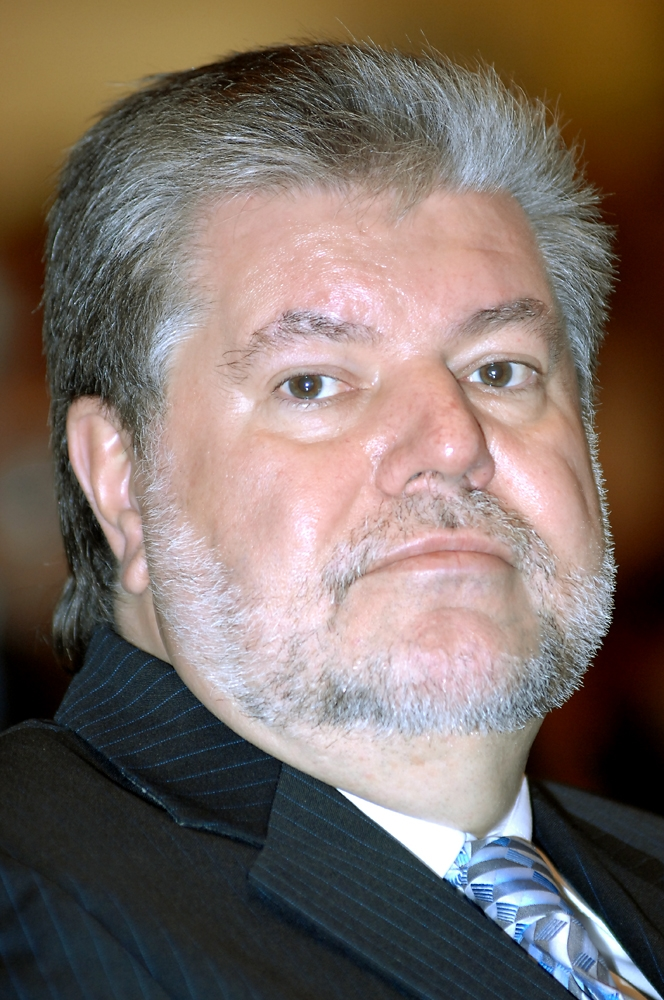

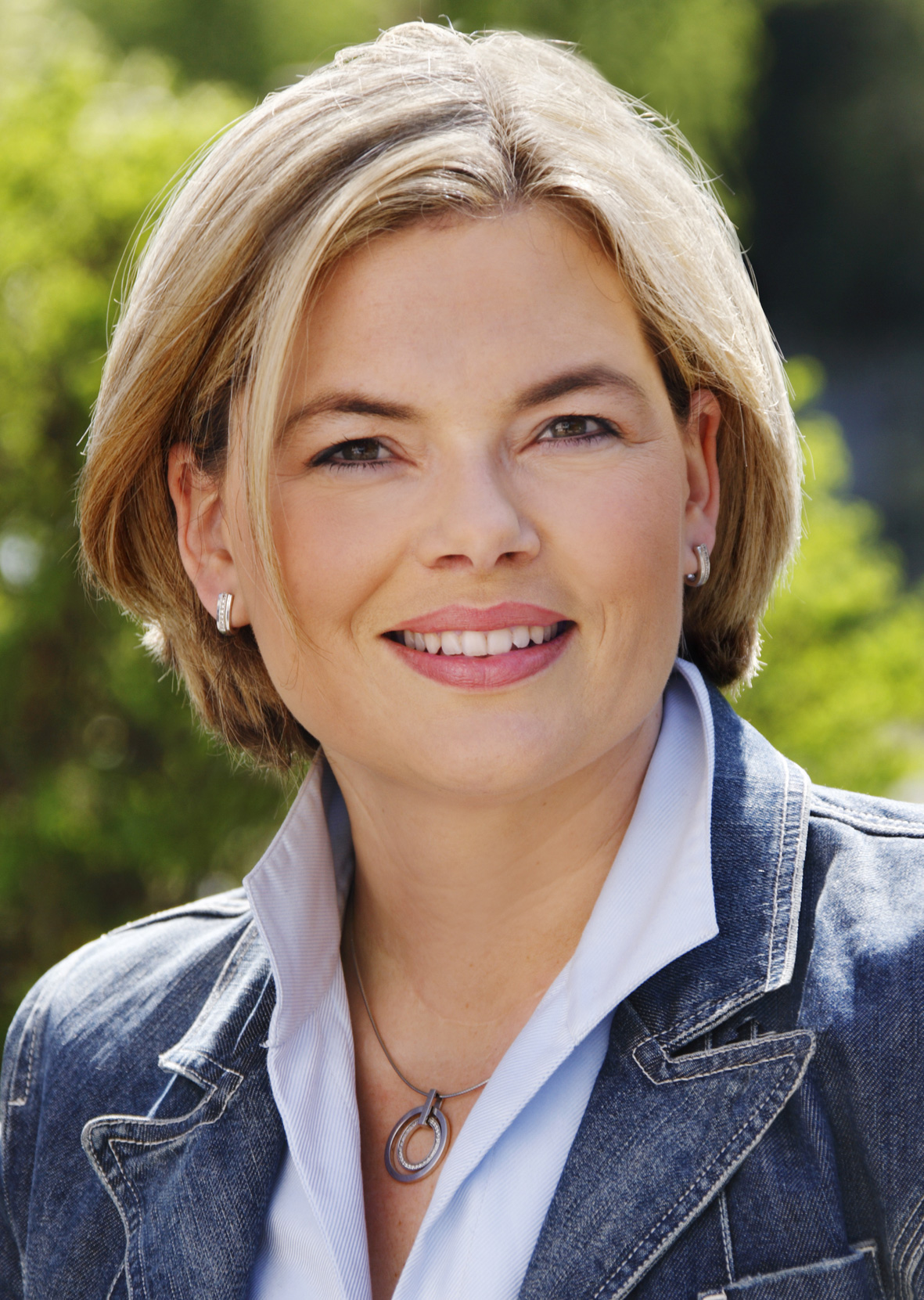

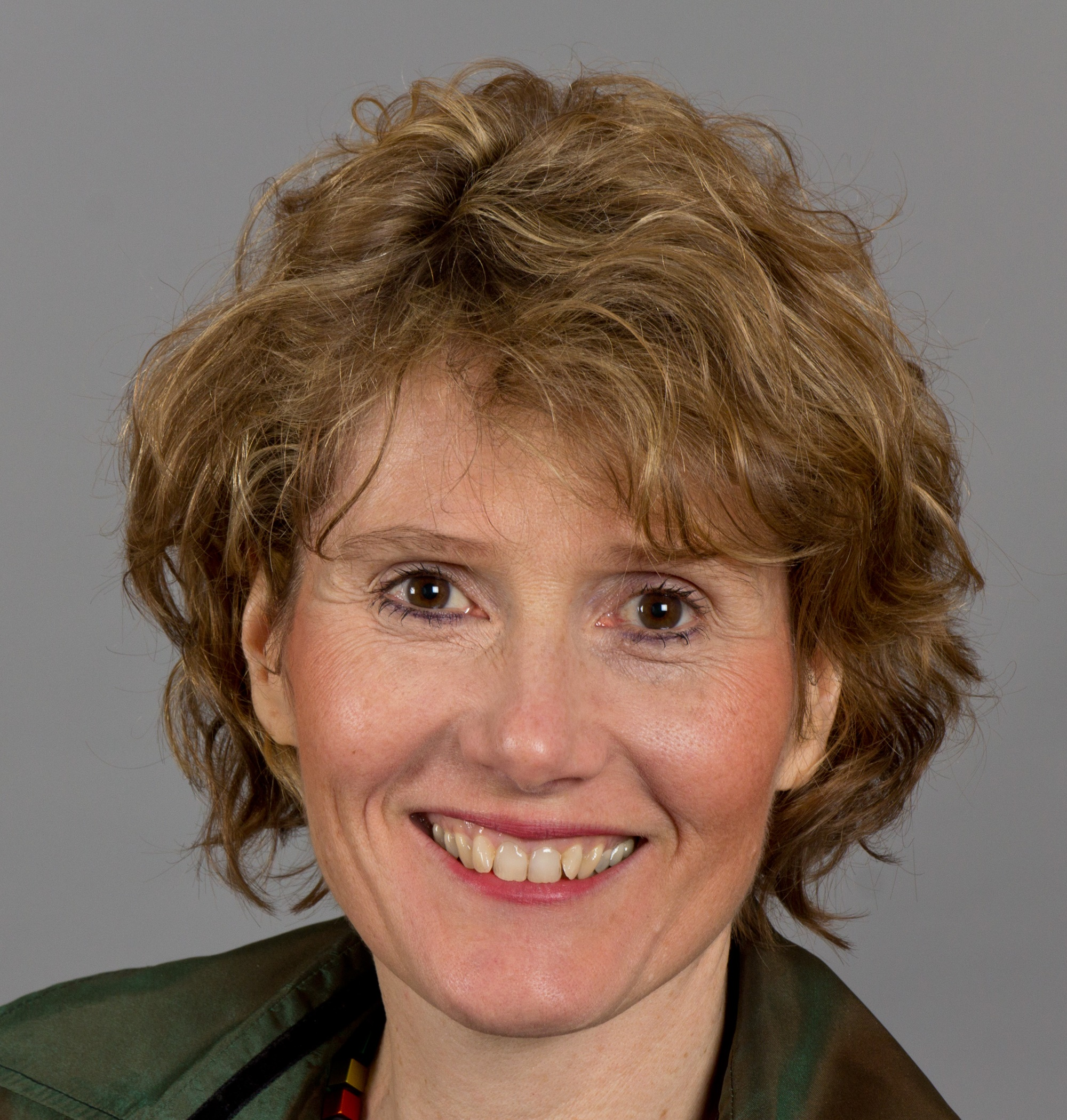

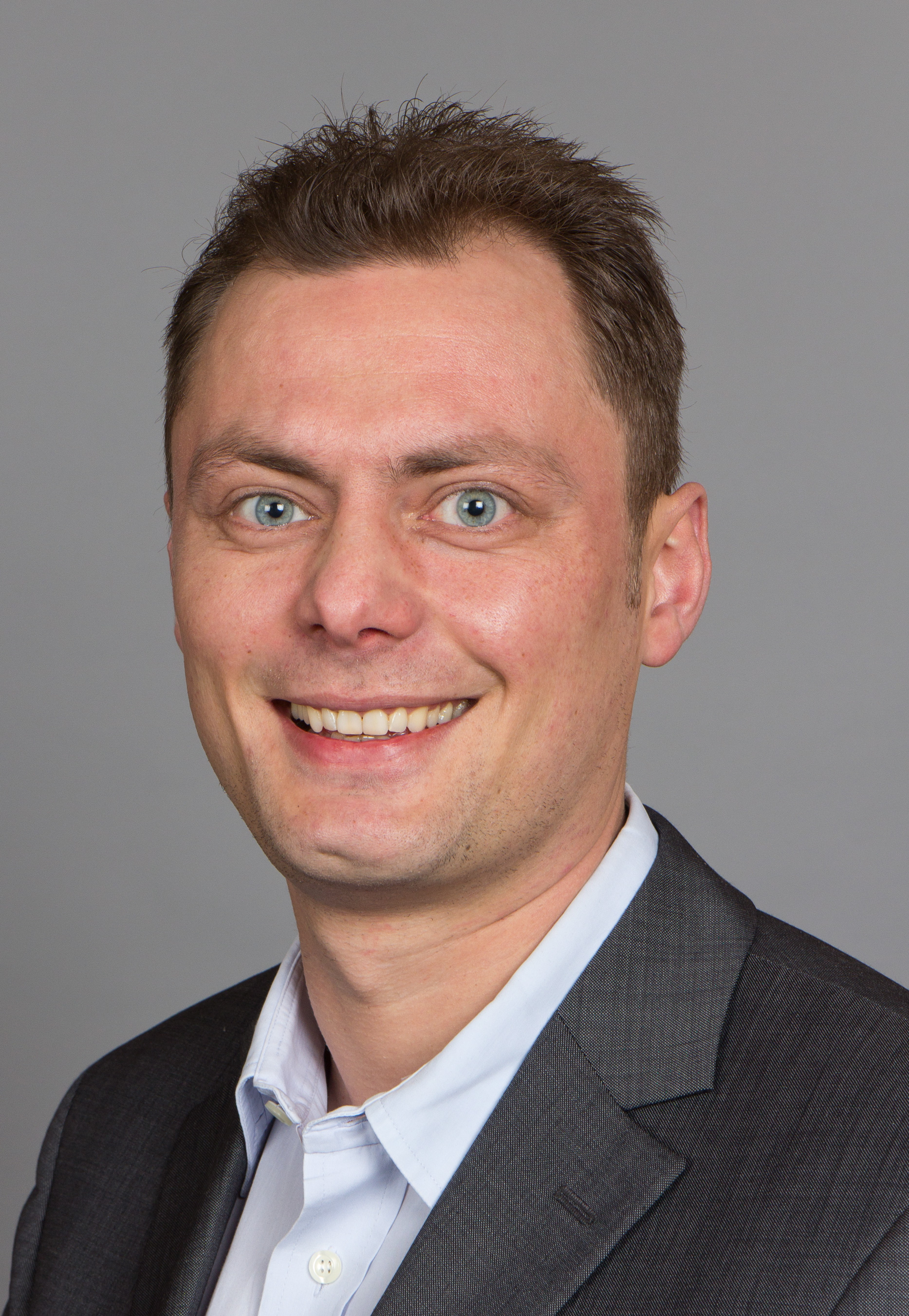

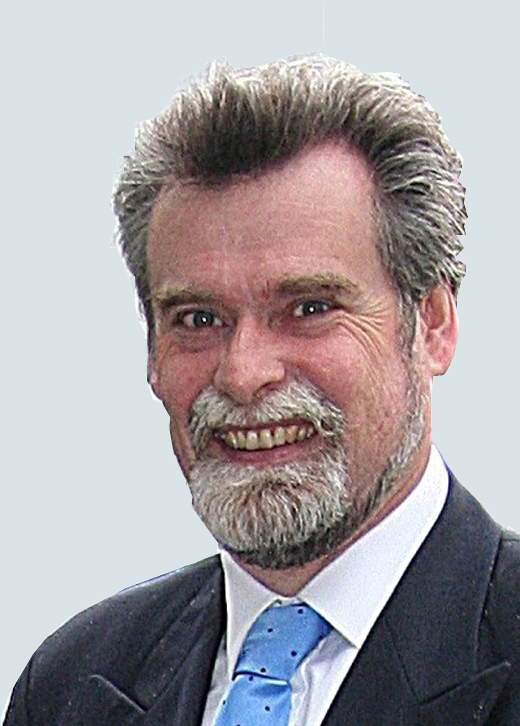
	First party	Second party
Leader	Kurt Beck	Julia Klöckner
Party	SPD	CDU
Last election	53 seats, 45.6%	38 seats, 32.8%
Seats won	42	41
Seat change	▼11	▲3
Popular vote	666,817	658,474
Percentage	35.7%	35.2%
Swing	▼9.9%	▲2.4%
	Third party	Fourth party
Leader	Eveline Lemke; Daniel Köbler	Herbert Mertin
Party	Greens	FDP
Last election	0 seats, 4.6%	8.0%
Seats won	18	0
Seat change	▲18	▼10
Popular vote	288,489	79,343
Percentage	15.4%	4.2%
Swing	▲10.8%	▼3.8%
- Results for the single-member constituencies
Government before election
Fourth Beck cabinet
SPD
Government after election
Fifth Beck cabinet
SPD–Green

The 2011 Rhineland-Palatinate state election was held on 27 March 2011 to elect the members of the Landtag of Rhineland-Palatinate. The incumbent Social Democratic Party (SPD) government led by Minister-President Kurt Beck lost its majority. The SPD subsequently formed a coalition with The Greens, and Beck continued in office.

== Parties ==
The table below lists parties represented in the previous Landtag of Rhineland-Palatinate.

Name		Ideology	Leader(s)	2006 result	
Name		Ideology	Leader(s)	Votes (%)	Seats
SPD	Social Democratic Party of Germany; Sozialdemokratische Partei Deutschlands	Social democracy	Kurt Beck	45.6%	53 / 101
CDU	Christian Democratic Union of Germany; Christlich Demokratische Union Deutschlands	Christian democracy	Julia Klöckner	32.8%	38 / 101
FDP	Free Democratic Party; Freie Demokratische Partei	Classical liberalism	Herbert Mertin	8.0%	10 / 101

== Opinion polling ==
Polling firm	Fieldwork date	Sample size	SPD	CDU	FDP	Grüne	Linke	Others	Lead
2011 state election	27 Mar 2011	–	35.7	35.2	4.2	15.4	3.0	6.4	0.5
Emnid	18–24 Mar 2011	1,000	38	35	5	13	4	5	3
Emnid	11–17 Mar 2011	1,000	37	34	6	14	4	5	3
Forschungsgruppe Wahlen	15–17 Mar 2011	1,300	37	35	5	13	4	6	2
Infratest dimap	14–17 Mar 2011	1,250	36	36	5	13	4	6	Tie
Psephos	8–11 Mar 2011	1,003	40	35	5	10	4	6	5
Emnid	4–10 Mar 2011	1,000	39	34	6	10	5	6	5
Infratest dimap	4–7 Mar 2011	1,000	38	36	7	10	5	4	2
Emnid	24 Feb–1 Mar 2011	1,000	40	34	5	11	5	5	6
Emnid	18–24 Feb 2011	1,001	38	36	5	12	5	4	2
Emnid	11–17 Feb 2011	1,001	38	35	5	12	5	5	3
Infratest dimap	11–14 Feb 2011	1,000	38	36	5	12	4	5	2
Emnid	4–10 Feb 2011	1,002	40	34	4	13	5	4	6
Emnid	31 Jan–3 Feb 2011	1,001	38	36	4	13	5	6	2
Forschungsgruppe Wahlen	31 Jan–2 Feb 2011	1,060	37	35	5	13	4	6	2
Infratest dimap	21–24 Jan 2011	1,001	37	37	5	13	5	3	Tie
Emnid	1–15 Dec 2010	1,002	39	37	4	11	4	5	2
Psephos	6–11 Dec 2010	1,001	41	35	5	10	5	?	6
Infratest dimap	3–6 Dec 2010	1,000	35	35	5	16	5	4	Tie
Infratest dimap	17–20 Sep 2010	1,000	36	34	4	16	5	5	2
Psephos	6–10 Sep 2010	1,002	42	34	6	8	5	5	8
Psephos	11–17 Jun 2010	1,007	41	33	8	7	5	6	7
Infratest dimap	16–19 Apr 2010	1,000	35	37	8	11	5	4	2
Psephos	9–13 Mar 2010	1,005	39	34	10	7	5	5	5
Infratest dimap	8–11 Dec 2009	1,003	36	36	11	7	3	6	Tie
Infratest dimap	4–7 Dec 2009	1,000	32	38	10	9	6	5	6
Infratest dimap	11–14 Sep 2009	1,000	33	35	13	7	7	5	2
Psephos	9–14 Sep 2009	1,003	36	33	14	7	6	5	3
Psephos	16–20 Jun 2009	1,000	38	31	13	7	5	6	7
Infratest dimap	22–25 May 2009	1,000	36	36	12	7	5	4	Tie
Psephos	11–17 Mar 2009	1,003	38	32	13	8	4	5	6
Psephos	4–10 Dec 2008	1,003	41	34	11	6	5	3	7
Infratest dimap	4–8 Dec 2008	1,000	36	35	12	8	5	4	1
polis+sinus	29 Oct–15 Nov 2008	1,512	39	35	11	7	4	4	4
Infratest dimap	15–16 Sep 2008	1,000	38	38	9	6	5	4	Tie
Psephos	2–9 Sep 2008	1,439	38	35	11	5	7	4	3
Infratest dimap	29 Aug–2 Sep 2008	1,000	36	38	10	6	6	4	2
Psephos	9–12 Jun 2008	1,004	37	36	11	6	7	3	1
Infratest dimap	8–9 Apr 2008	1,000	37	37	9	7	6	4	Tie
Infratest dimap	11–12 Mar 2008	1,000	39	37	8	7	7	2	2
Psephos	1–7 Mar 2008	1,001	40	34	10	6	5	?	6
Psephos	8–13 Dec 2007	1,003	42	33	10	4.5	5.5	5	9
Infratest dimap	5–10 Dec 2007	1,000	42	37	8	6	4	3	5
Psephos	11–15 Sep 2007	1,003	43	33	9	5	–	10	10
Forsa	6–28 Aug 2007	1,061	40	34	8	5	6	7	6
Infratest dimap	20–23 Jul 2007	1,000	43	36	6	6	5	4	7
Psephos	7–11 May 2007	1,006	44	32	10	6	3	5	12
Forsa	26 Apr 2007	?	43	31	9	6	4	7	12
Infratest dimap	20–23 Apr 2007	1,000	43	33	8	7	3	6	10
Forsa	20 Feb–20 Mar 2007	1,006	45	29	9	6	4	7	16
Psephos	5–9 Mar 2007	1,001	46	31	8	6	3	6	15
Psephos	11–16 Dec 2006	1,002	45	31	10	5	2	7	14
Infratest dimap	8–11 Dec 2006	1,000	43	31	11	7	2	6	12
Psephos	11–14 Sep 2006	1,004	46	31	9	5	4	5	15
Forsa	9–15 Aug 2006	1,001	46	26	10	6	5	7	20
Infratest dimap	10–11 Jul 2006	1,000	46	31	9	6	3	5	15
Infratest dimap	15–16 May 2006	1,000	43	31	11	5	2	8	12
2006 state election	26 Mar 2006	–	45.6	32.8	8.0	4.6	2.6	6.4	12.8

== Election result ==
Summary of the 27 March 2011 election results for the Landtag of Rhineland-Palatinate
Party	Votes	%	+/-	Seats	+/-	Seats %
Social Democratic Party (SPD)	666,817	35.7	▼9.9	42	▼11	41.6
Christian Democratic Union (CDU)	658,474	35.2	▲2.4	41	▲3	40.6
Alliance 90/The Greens (Grüne)	288,489	15.4	▲10.8	18	▲18	17.8
Free Democratic Party (FDP)	79,343	4.2	▼3.8	0	▼10	0
The Left (Linke)	56,054	3.0	▲0.4 (Note: Compared to results for WASG (2.6%).)	0	±0 (Note: Compared to results for WASG (2.6%).)	0
Free Voters (FW)	43,348	2.3	▲0.7	0	±0	0
Pirate Party Germany (Piraten)	29,319	1.6	New	0	New	0
National Democratic Party (NPD)	20,586	1.1	▼0.1	0	±0	0
Others	25,757	1.4		0	±0	0
Total	1,868,187	100.0		101	±0	
Voter turnout		61.8	▲3.2			

Popular Vote
SPD	35.69%
CDU	35.25%
B'90/GRÜNE	15.44%
FDP	4.25%
DIE LINKE	3.00%
Other	6.37%

Landtag seats
SPD	41.58%
CDU	40.59%
B'90/GRÜNE	17.82%
