= Dreyer cabinet =

Dreyer cabinet may refer to one of the following state governments of the German state of Rhineland-Palatinate:

- First Dreyer cabinet
- Second Dreyer cabinet
- Third Dreyer cabinet
