= Cabinet Beck IV =

State government of Rhineland-Palatinate (2006-2011)

Fourth Cabinet of Kurt Beck Cabinet Beck IV
- 21st Cabinet of Rhineland-Palatinate
- 18 May 2006 – 18 May 2011
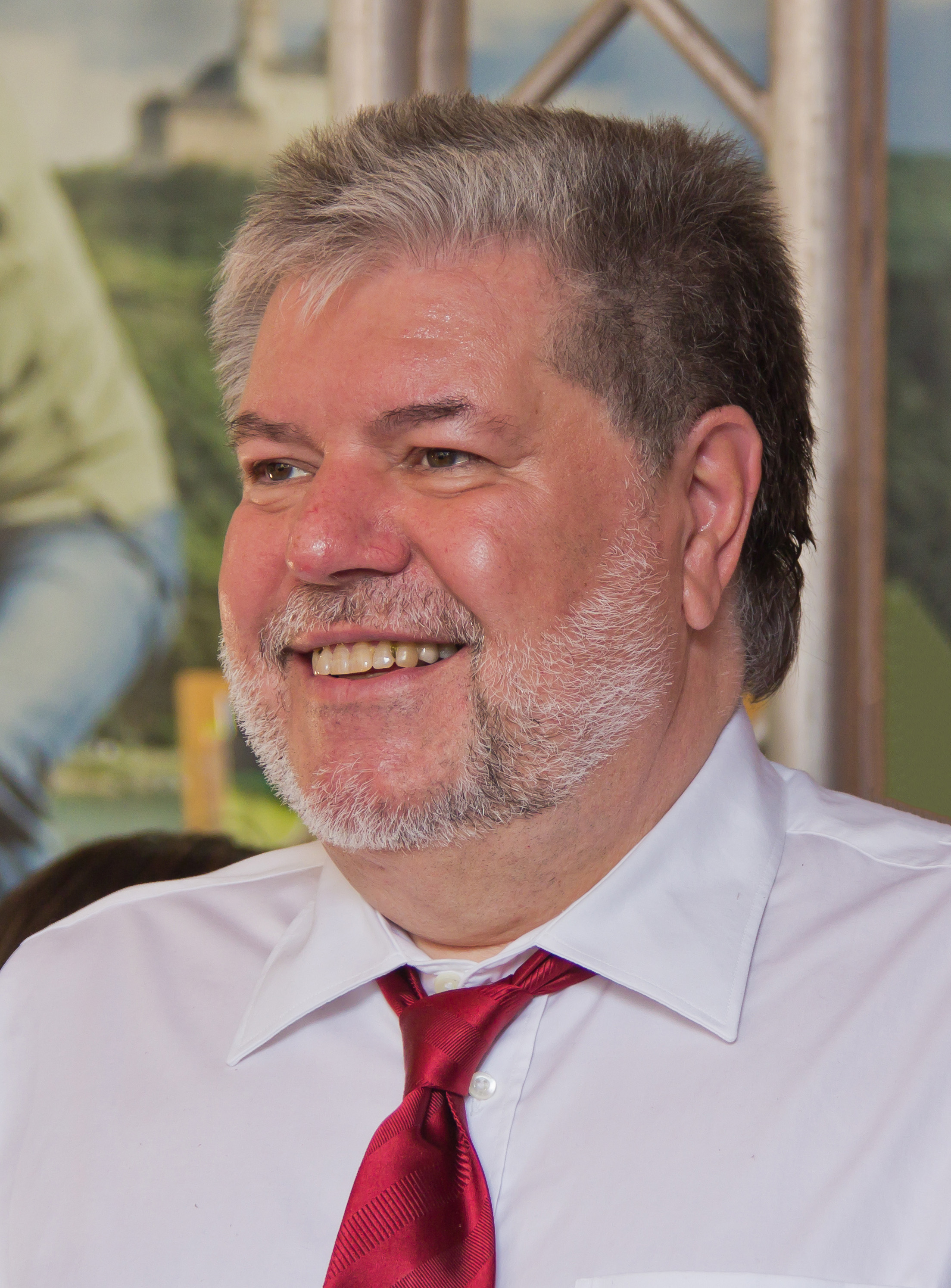
- Kurt Beck
- Date formed: 18 May 2006
- Date dissolved: 18 May 2011 (5 years)

People and organisations
- Chancellor: Angela Merkel
- Minister President: Kurt Beck
- Deputy Minister President: Karl Peter Bruch
- Member party: Social Democratic Party
- Status in legislature: Majority
- Opposition party: Christian Democratic Union; Free Democratic Party
- Opposition leader: Christian Democratic Union

History
- Election: 2006 Rhineland-Palatinate state election
- Legislature term: 15th Landtag of Rhineland-Palatinate
- Predecessor: Cabinet Beck III
- Successor: Cabinet Beck V

The Cabinet Beck IV was the state government of the German state of Rhineland-Palatinate from 18 May 2006 until 18 May 2011. The Cabinet was headed by Minister President Kurt Beck and was formed by the Social Democratic Party, after Beck’s winning of the 2006 Rhineland-Palatinate state election. On 18 May 2006 Beck was re-elected and sworn in as Minister President by the Landtag of Rhineland-Palatinate. It was succeeded by Beck's fifth and last cabinet.

== Composition ==
Portfolio	Minister	Took office	Left office	Party
Minister President	Kurt Beck	18 May 2006	18 May 2011	SPD
Deputy Minister President	Jürgen Zöllner	18 May 2006	20 November 2006	SPD
Deputy Minister President	Karl Peter Bruch	21 November 2006	18 May 2011	SPD
Minister for Economy, Transport, Agriculture and Viticulture	Hendrik Hering	18 May 2006	18 May 2011	SPD
Minister for the Interior and Sport	Karl Peter Bruch	18 May 2006	18 May 2011	SPD
Minister for Employment, Social, Health, Family Affairs and Women	Malu Dreyer	18 May 2006	18 May 2011	SPD
Minister for Education, Science, Youth and Culture	Doris Ahnen	18 May 2006	18 May 2011	SPD
Minister for Finance	Ingolf Deubel	18 May 2006	7 July 2009	SPD
Minister for Finance	Carsten Kühl	7 July 2009	18 May 2011	SPD
Minister for Justice	Heinz Georg Bamberger	18 May 2006	18 May 2011	SPD
Minister for Economy, Transport, Agriculture and Viticulture	Hendrik Hering	18 May 2006	18 May 2011	SPD
Minister for the Environment, Forestry and Consumer protection	Margit Conrad	18 May 2006	18 May 2011	SPD
