= Grützmacher =

Grützmacher is a surname. Notable people with the surname include:

- Friedel Grützmacher (born 1942), German politician
- Friedrich Grützmacher (1832–1903), German cellist and composer
- Leopold Grützmacher (1835–1900), German cellist and composer
- Sabine Grützmacher (born 1986), German politician
