= Second Dreyer cabinet =

State government of Rhineland-Palatinate

Second Cabinet of Malu Dreyer Dreyer II
- 24th Cabinet of Rhineland-Palatinate
- 18 May 2016 – 18 May 2021
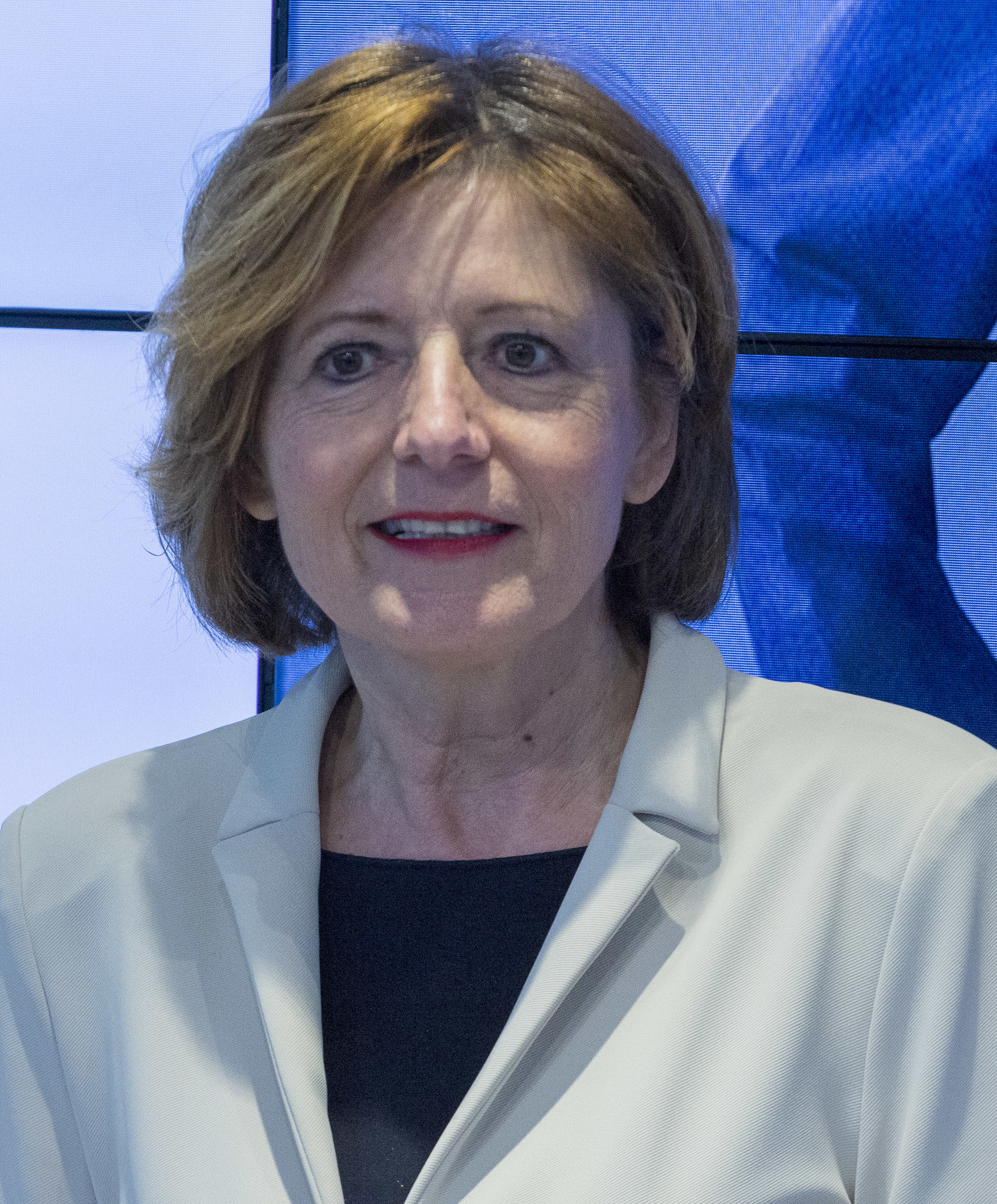
- Malu Dreyer in March 2021
- Date formed: 18 May 2016
- Date dissolved: 18 May 2021

People and organisations
- Minister-President: Malu Dreyer
- Deputy Minister-President: Volker Wissing
- No. of ministers: 10
- Member parties: Social Democratic Party; Alliance 90/The Greens; Free Democratic Party
- Status in legislature: Majority (Coalition)
- Opposition parties: Christian Democratic Union

History
- Election: 2016 Rhineland-Palatinate state election
- Legislature term: 17th Landtag of Rhineland-Palatinate
- Predecessor: Dreyer I
- Successor: Dreyer III

The Second Dreyer cabinet was the state government of the German state of Rhineland-Palatinate from 18 May 2016 until 18 May 2021. The Cabinet was headed by Minister President Malu Dreyer, and comprised the SPD, the Greens and the FDP, formed following the 2016 state election. On 18 May 2016 Dreyer was elected and sworn in as Minister President by the Landtag of Rhineland-Palatinate. It was succeeded by Dreyers's third cabinet.

The cabinet comprised 10 ministers including the Minister-President: six from the SPD, and two each from the Greens and FDP.

== Composition ==
Cabinet members
Portfolio	Minister	Took office	Left office	Party
Minister President	Malu Dreyer	18 May 2016	18 May 2021	SPD
Deputy Minister President &	Volker Wissing	18 May 2016	18 May 2021	FDP
Minister of the Interior and Sport	Roger Lewentz	18 May 2016	18 May 2021	SPD
Minister of Finance	Doris Ahnen	18 May 2016	18 May 2021	SPD
Minister for Justice	Herbert Mertin	18 May 2016	18 May 2021	FDP
Minister for Environment, Energy, Nutrition and Forests	Ulrike Höfken	18 May 2016	31 December 2020	Greens
Minister for Environment, Energy, Nutrition and Forests	Anne Spiegel	1 January 2021	18 May 2021	Greens
Minister for Family, Women, Youth, Integration and Consumer Protection	Anne Spiegel	18 May 2016	18 May 2021	Greens
Minister of Social Affairs, Labour, Health and Demography	Sabine Bätzing-Lichtenthäler	18 May 2016	18 May 2021	SPD
Minister for Education	Stefanie Hubig	18 May 2016	18 May 2021	SPD
Minister for Science, Further Education and Culture	Konrad Wolf	18 May 2016	18 May 2021	SPD
