= Johannes Schäfer (politician) =

German politician (born 1992)

Member of the Landtag of Rhineland-Palatinate
- Assuming office 18 May 2026
- Succeeding: Patric Müller
- Constituency: Mainz III

Personal details
- Born: 1992 (age 33–34)
- Party: Christian Democratic Union
- Parent: Dorothea Schäfer (mother)

Johannes Schäfer (born 1992) is a German politician who was elected member of the Landtag of Rhineland-Palatinate in 2026. He is the son of Dorothea Schäfer.
