= David Langner (politician) =

German politician (born 1975)

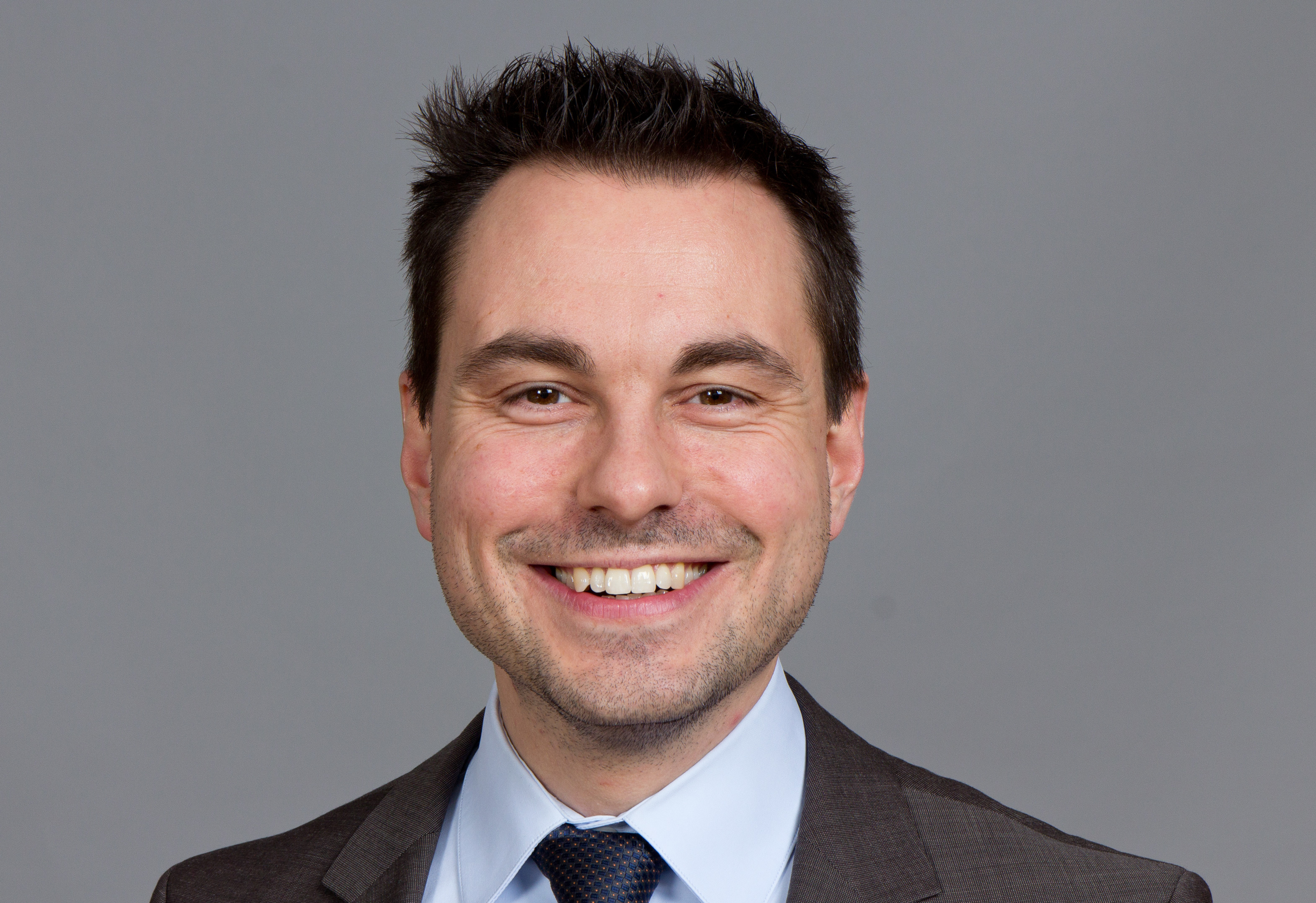
- Langner in 2014

Member of the Landtag of Rhineland-Palatinate
- In office 18 May 2006 – 18 May 2011
- Preceded by: Roger Lewentz

Personal details
- Born: 20 September 1975 (age 50) Koblenz
- Party: Social Democratic Party (since 1994)

David Langner (born 20 September 1975 in Koblenz) is a German politician serving as mayor of Koblenz since 2018. From 2013 to 2018, he served as state secretary of social affairs, labour, health and demography of Rhineland-Palatinate. From 2006 to 2011, he was a member of the Landtag of Rhineland-Palatinate.
