= David Langner =

David Langner may refer to:

- David Langner (American football) (1951–2014), American football player
- David Langner (politician) (born 1975), German politician
