= Altherr =

Altherr is a surname. Notable people with the surname include:

- Aaron Altherr (born 1991), German-American professional baseball outfielder
- Hans Altherr (born 1950), Swiss politician
- Heinrich Altherr (1878–1947), Swiss painter
- Walter Altherr (born 1946), German politician
