= Christoph Gensch =

German politician (born 1978)

Member of the Landtag of Rhineland-Palatinate
- Incumbent
- Assumed office 18 May 2016
- Preceded by: Fritz Presl
- Constituency: Zweibrücken

Personal details
- Born: 3 November 1978 (age 47)
- Party: Christian Democratic Union

Christoph Gensch (born 3 November 1978) is a German politician serving as a member of the Landtag of Rhineland-Palatinate since 2016. From 2018 to 2019, he served as secretary general of the Christian Democratic Union in Rhineland-Palatinate.
