= 2006 Rhineland-Palatinate state election =

German state election

- 26 March 2006

All 101 seats of the Landtag of Rhineland-Palatinate 51 seats needed for a majority
- Turnout: 1,753,110 (58.2%) ▼4.0%
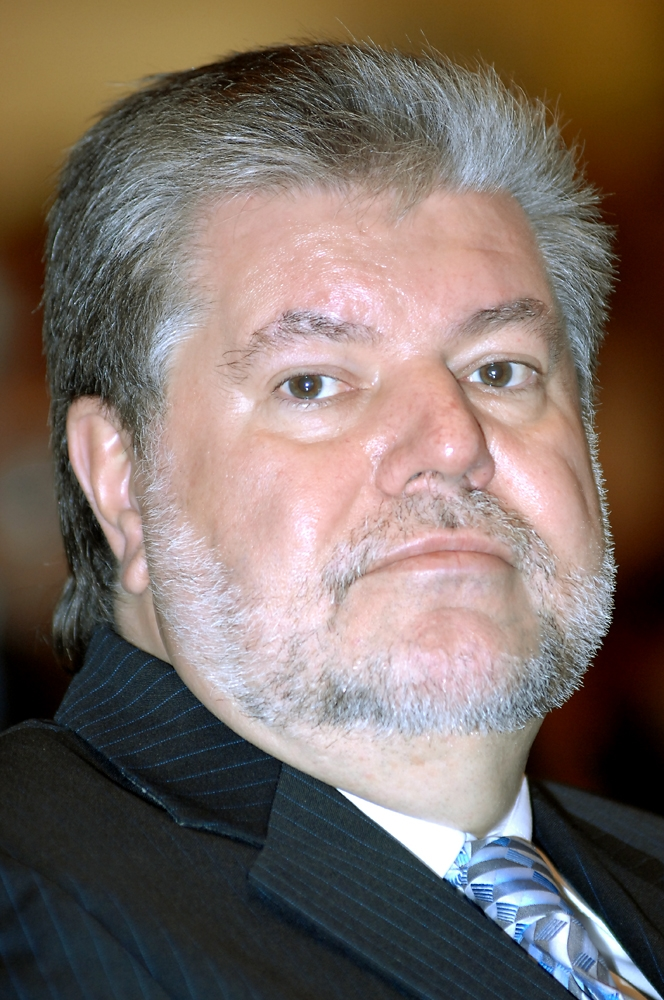

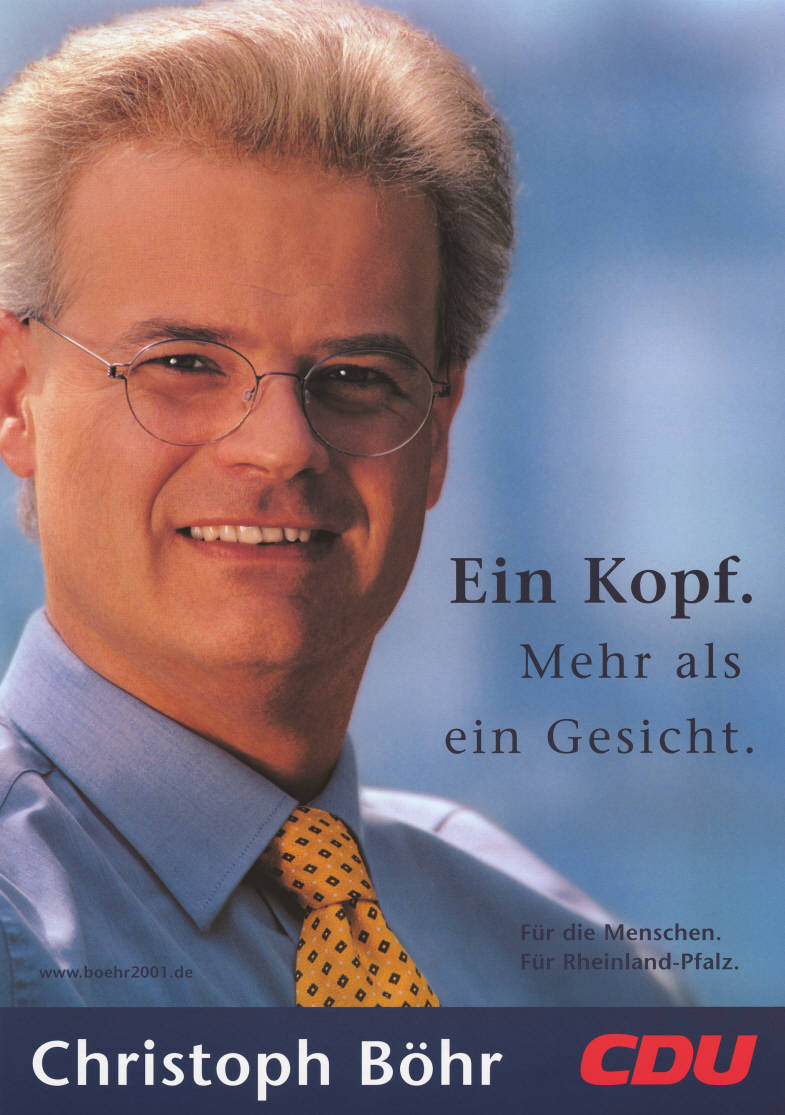

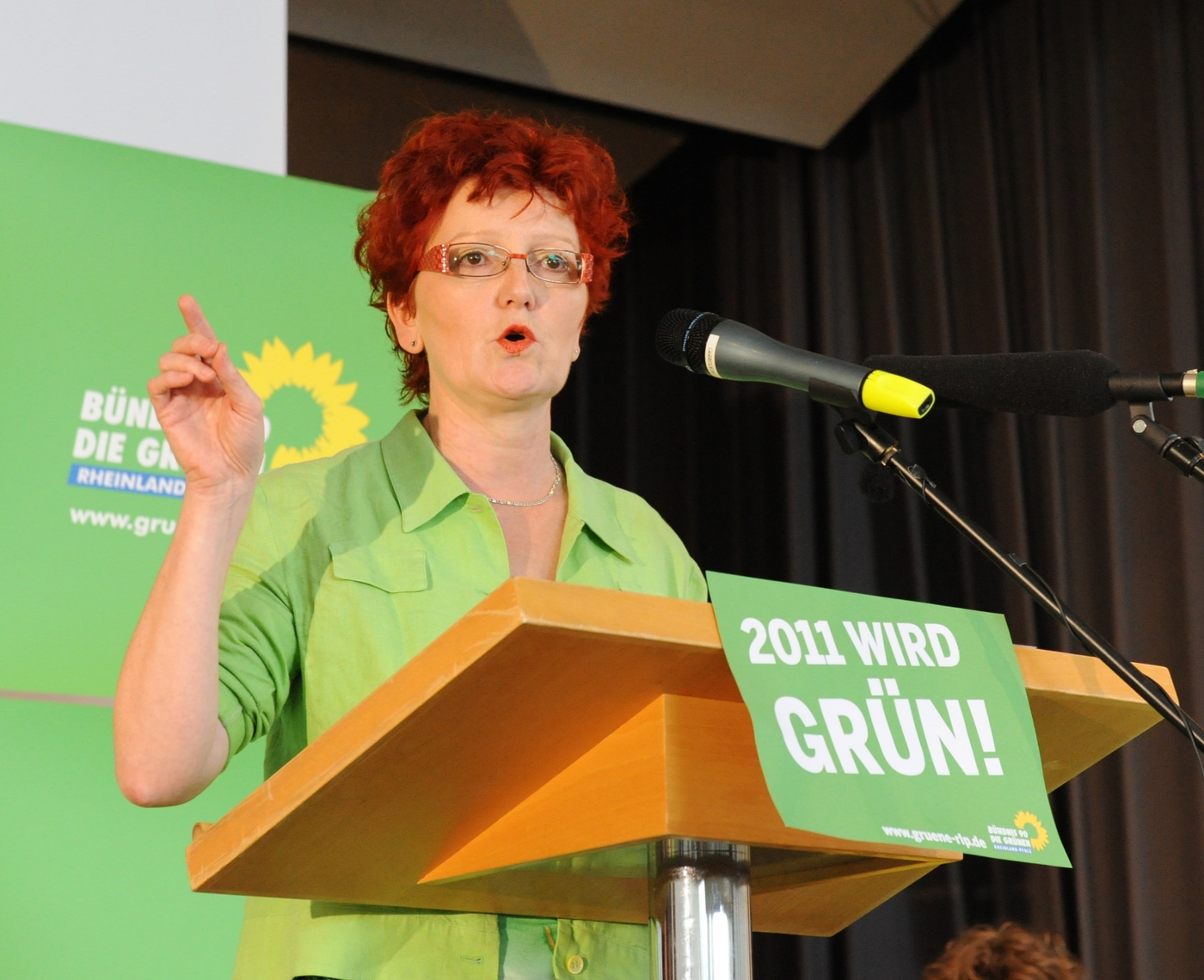
	First party	Second party
Leader	Kurt Beck	Christoph Böhr
Party	SPD	CDU
Last election	49 seats, 44.8%	38 seats, 35.3%
Seats won	53	38
Seat change	▲4	0
Popular vote	799,377	574,329
Percentage	45.6%	32.8%
Swing	▲0.8%	▼2.5%
	Third party	Fourth party
Leader	Hans-Artur Bauckhage	Ise Thomas
Party	FDP	Greens
Last election	8 seats, 7.8%	6 seats, 5.2%
Seats won	10	0
Seat change	▲2	▼6
Popular vote	140,865	81,411
Percentage	8.0%	4.6%
Swing	▲0.2%	▼0.6%
- Results for the single-member constituencies
Minister-President before election
Kurt Beck
SPD
Elected Minister-President
Kurt Beck
SPD

The 2006 Rhineland-Palatinate state election was held on 26 March 2006 to elect the members of the Landtag of Rhineland-Palatinate. The incumbent coalition government of the Social Democratic Party (SPD) and Free Democratic Party (FDP) led by Minister-President Kurt Beck retained its majority. However, as the SPD won an outright majority, the FDP chose not to continue the coalition. Beck was subsequently re-elected as Minister-President.

== Campaign and issues ==
The election was one of the first held under the grand coalition federal government. Thus, the SPD and CDU did not attack each other as harshly as previously. The SPD was expected to benefit from the personality of Kurt Beck, while the CDU ran again with their leader Christoph Böhr, who had already lost the 2001 election.

== Parties ==
The table below lists parties represented in the previous Landtag of Rhineland-Palatinate.

Name		Ideology	Leader(s)	2001 result	
Name		Ideology	Leader(s)	Votes (%)	Seats
SPD	Social Democratic Party of Germany; Sozialdemokratische Partei Deutschlands	Social democracy	Kurt Beck	44.8%	49 / 101
CDU	Christian Democratic Union of Germany; Christlich Demokratische Union Deutschlands	Christian democracy	Christoph Böhr	35.3%	38 / 101
FDP	Free Democratic Party; Freie Demokratische Partei	Classical liberalism	Hans-Artur Bauckhage	7.8%	8 / 101
Grüne	Alliance 90/The Greens; Bündnis 90/Die Grünen	Green politics	Ise Thomas	5.2%	6 / 101

== Opinion polling ==
Polling firm	Fieldwork date	Sample size	SPD	CDU	FDP	Grüne	WASG	Others	Lead
2006 state election	26 Mar 2006	–	45.6	32.8	8.0	4.6	2.6	6.4	12.8
Emnid	7–18 Mar 2006	500	43	35	9	7	3	3	8
Forschungsgruppe Wahlen	13–16 Mar 2006	~1,000	43	36	8	6	3	4	7
Infratest dimap	13–15 Mar 2006	1,000	43	35	9	6	3	4	8
Forsa	9–10 Mar 2006	1,001	39	34	10	8	4	5	5
Infratest dimap	25–28 Feb 2006	1,000	42	35	8	6	4	5	7
Psephos	21–23 Feb 2006	1,006	42	38	5	8	2	5	4
Infratest dimap	30 Jan–1 Feb 2006	1,000	42	36	8	6	4	4	6
Forsa	17–20 Jan 2006	1,002	37	37	11	7	4	4	Tie
Infratest dimap	8–12 Dec 2005	1,000	39	37	10	6	4	4	2
Psephos	22–24 Nov 2005	1,003	41	37	10	5	3	4	4
Infratest dimap	29 Aug–4 Sep 2005	1,000	35	43	8	6	4	4	8
Psephos	11–15 Aug 2005	1,002	41	39	8	5	4	3	2
Psephos	23–26 May 2005	1,001	39	40	9	5	1	6	1
Infratest dimap	7–13 Mar 2005	1,000	38	40	8	8	–	6	1
Psephos	15–17 Feb 2005	1,005	41	38	8	6	–	7	3
Infratest dimap	7–12 Dec 2004	1,000	38	39	8	8	–	7	1
Psephos	3–6 Nov 2004	1,003	39	39	9	6	–	7	Tie
Infratest dimap	7 Oct 2004	1,000	36	37	10	9	–	8	1
Psephos	24–27 Aug 2004	1,002	37	40	8	7	1	7	3
Infratest dimap	24–29 May 2004	1,000	34	45	8	8	–	6	11
Psephos	11–13 May 2004	1,003	37	43	8	6	–	6	6
Infratest dimap	8–13 Mar 2004	1,000	32	48	8	7	–	5	16
Psephos	10–13 Feb 2004	1,000	39	42	8	6	–	5	3
Infratest dimap	1–6 Dec 2003	1,000	35	45	8	7	–	5	10
Psephos	5–7 Nov 2003	1,006	35	45	8	7	–	?	10
Infratest dimap	23–27 Sep 2003	1,000	35	46	7	7	–	5	11
Psephos	8–11 Aug 2003	1,001	39	43	8	6	–	?	4
Infratest dimap	16–21 Jun 2003	1,000	36	47	7	6	–	4	11
Psephos	14–17 May 2003	1,005	37	45	7	8	–	3	8
Infratest dimap	10–15 Mar 2003	1,000	33	47	7	8	–	5	14
Psephos	10–13 Feb 2003	1,002	36	46	7	8	–	2	10
Infratest dimap	9–14 Dec 2002	1,001	35	45	7	7	–	6	10
Psephos	12–14 Nov 2002	1,005	40	42	7	7	–	4	2
Infratest dimap	2–7 Sep 2002	1,000	45	35	13	3	–	4	10
Psephos	1–3 Aug 2002	1,003	42	39	10	4	–	?	3
Infratest dimap	27 May–1 Jun 2002	1,000	41	38	12	5	–	4	3
Psephos	6–10 May 2002	1,004	40	38	10	6	–	?	2
Infratest dimap	4–9 Mar 2002	1,000	42	39	10	4	–	5	3
Psephos	1–5 Feb 2002	1,002	41	40	9	5	–	5	1
Infratest dimap	10–15 Dec 2001	1,000	43	39	10	3	–	5	4
Psephos	5–9 Nov 2001	1,002	45	36	9	5	–	5	9
Infratest dimap	10–15 Sep 2001	1,000	46	38	8	5	–	3	8
Psephos	27–30 Aug 2001	1,004	45	37	8	?	–	?	8
Infratest dimap	21–26 May 2001	1,000	46	36	7	5	–	6	10
Psephos	4–10 May 2001	1,003	46	35	9	5	–	5	11
2001 state election	25 Mar 2001	–	44.8	35.3	7.8	5.2	–	6.9	9.5

== Election result ==
Summary of the 26 March 2006 election results for the Landtag of Rhineland-Palatinate
Party	Votes	%	+/-	Seats	+/-	Seats %
Social Democratic Party (SPD)	799,377	45.6	▲0.8	53	▲4	52.5
Christian Democratic Union (CDU)	574,329	32.8	▼2.5	38	0	37.6
Free Democratic Party (FDP)	140,865	8.0	▲0.2	10	▲2	9.9
Alliance 90/The Greens (Grüne)	81,411	4.6	▼0.6	0	▼6	0
Labour and Social Justice (WASG)	44,826	2.6	New	0	New	0
The Republicans (REP)	29,919	1.7	▼0.7	0	±0	0
Free Voters (FW)	27,652	1.6	▼0.9	0	±0	0
National Democratic Party (NPD)	21,056	1.2	▲0.7	0	±0	0
Others	33,675	1.9		0	±0	0
Total	1,753,110	100.0		101	±0	
Voter turnout		58.2	▼4.0			

Popular Vote
SPD	45.60%
CDU	32.76%
FDP	8.04%
B'90/GRÜNE	4.64%
WASG	2.56%
Other	6.41%

Landtag seats
SPD	52.48%
CDU	37.62%
FDP	9.90%

== Sources ==
- Rhineland-Palatinate State Statistics Office
