= Michael Büge =

German politician (born 1966)

Member of the Landtag of Rhineland-Palatinate
- Incumbent
- Assumed office 18 May 2026

Personal details
- Born: 5 March 1966 (age 60)
- Party: Alternative for Germany (since 2016); Christian Democratic Union (1982–2016)

Michael Büge (born 5 March 1966) is a German politician who was elected member of the Landtag of Rhineland-Palatinate in 2026. From 2011 to 2013, he served as state secretary for social affairs of Berlin. He is chairing the parliamentary AFD group.
