= Friedel Grützmacher =

German politician (born 1942)

Elfriede "Friedel" Grützmacher (born 3 August 1942 in Leer, Lower Saxony) is a German politician (Alliance 90/The Greens).

== Life ==
Grützmacher studied German studies and sport to become a teacher in Germany. She worked as a teacher up from 1965 in Wörth in Rhineland-Palatinate and other places.

She joined the Green Party in 1983, and served as an elected Member of the Rhineland-Palatinate Landtag between 1991 and 2006. She was the leader of her party group in the Landtag from 1993 to 1996, deputy leader from 1996 to 2001, and was Vice President of the Landtag from 2001 until 2006. She served on the Committees for Justice and Internal Affairs and the Penal Justice Commission. Prior to 1996, she had been responsible for educational policy.
