= Hendrik Hering =

German politician (born 1964)

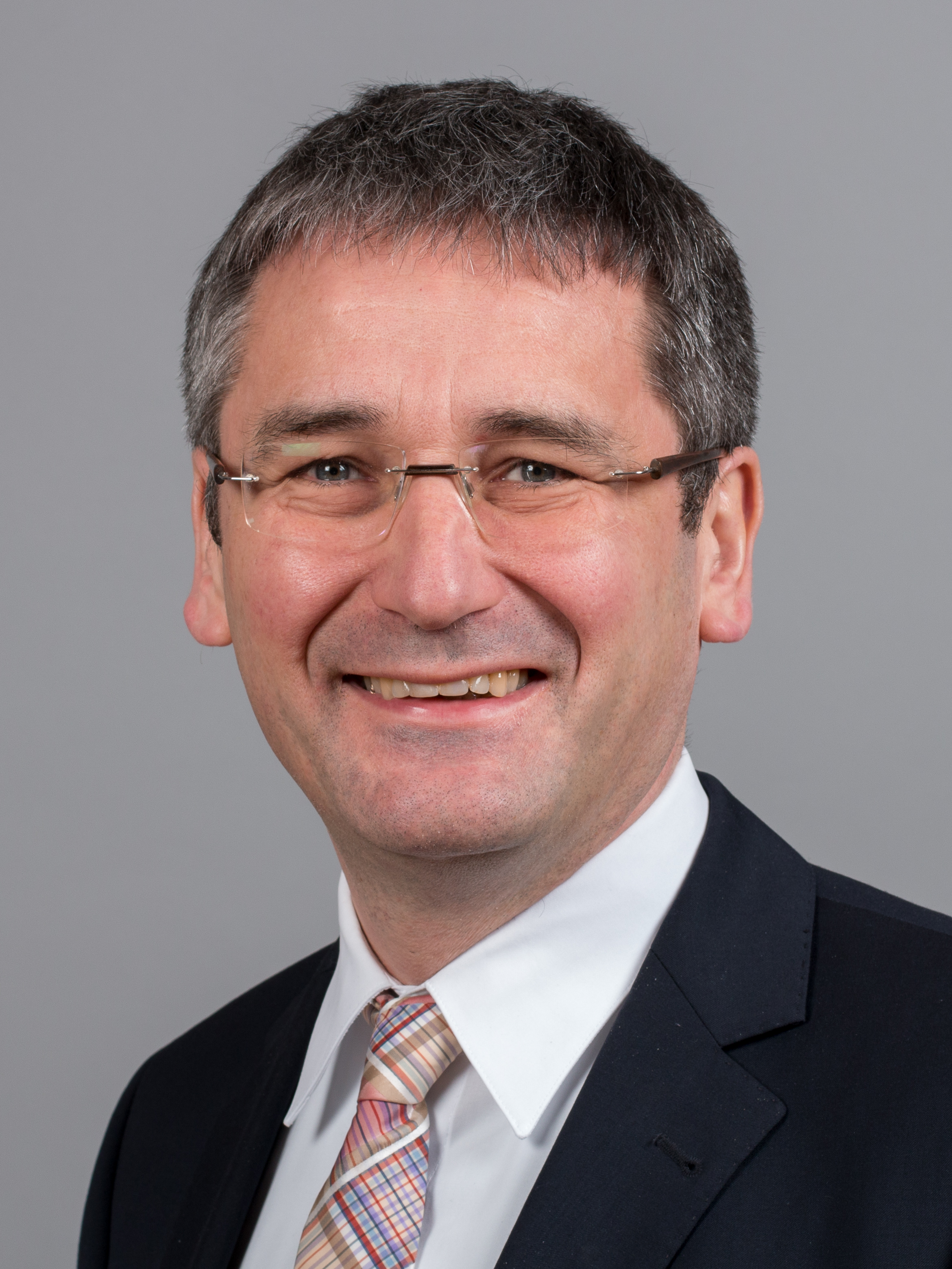
- Hering in 2014

President of the Landtag of Rhineland-Palatinate
- Incumbent
- Assumed office 18 May 2016
- Preceded by: Joachim Mertes

Personal details
- Born: 13 April 1964 (age 62) Hachenburg
- Party: Social Democratic Party (since 1982)

Hendrik Hering (born 13 April 1964 in Hachenburg) is a German politician serving as president of the Landtag of Rhineland-Palatinate since 2016. He has been a member of the Landtag since 2006, having previously served from 1996 to 2001. From 2006 to 2011, he served as minister of economic affairs, transport, agriculture and viticulture of Rhineland-Palatinate. From 1989 to 2001, he served as mayor of Hachenburg.
