= Matthias Lammert =

German politician (born 1968)

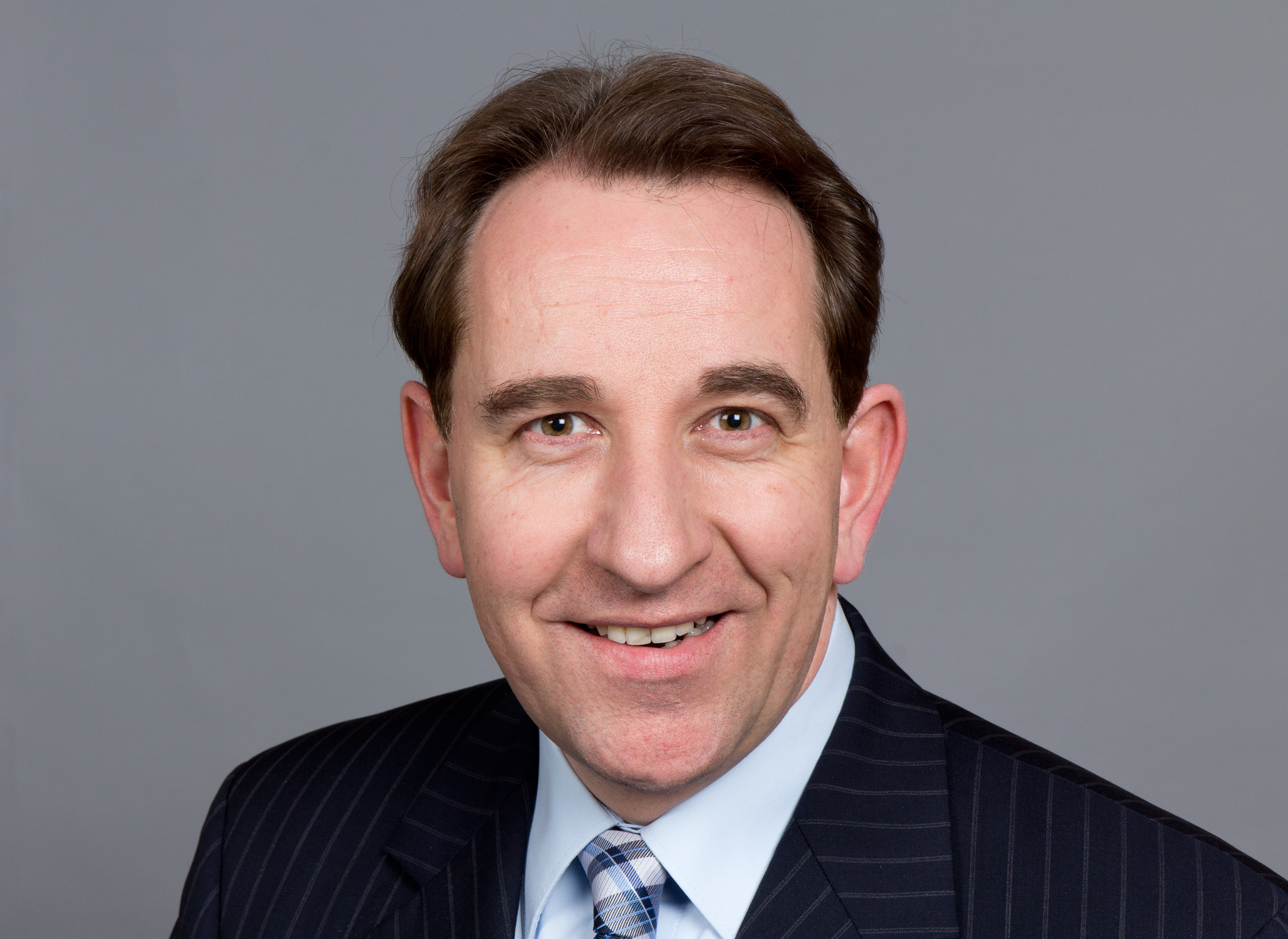
- Lammert in 2014

Member of the Landtag of Rhineland-Palatinate
- Incumbent
- Assumed office 18 May 2001

Personal details
- Born: 28 June 1968 (age 57) Tübingen
- Party: Christian Democratic Union (since 1991)

Matthias Lammert (born 28 June 1968 in Tübingen) is a German politician serving as a member of the Landtag of Rhineland-Palatinate since 2001. He has served as vice president of the Landtag since 2021.
