= Eveline Lemke =

German politician (born 1964)

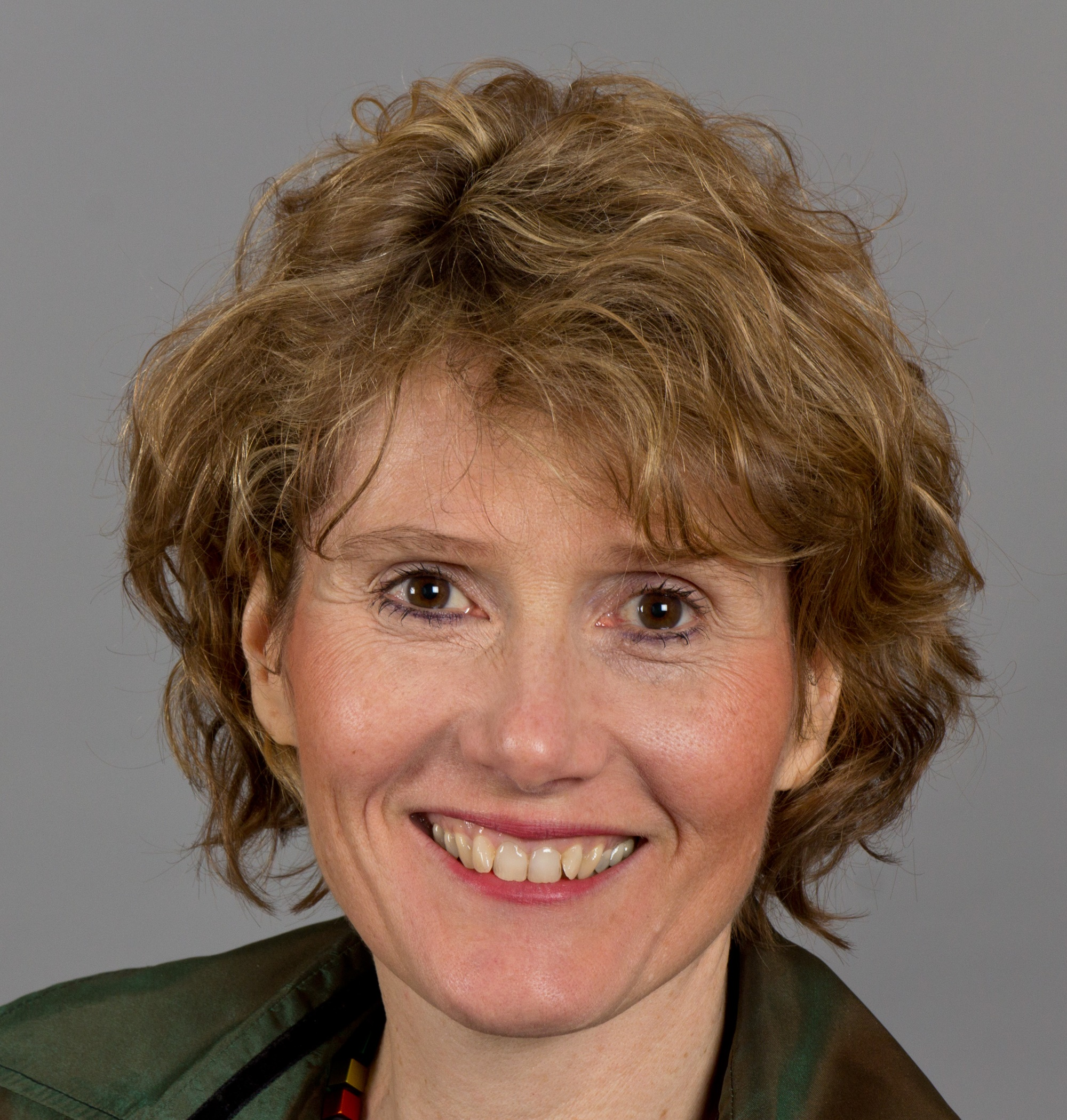
Lemke in 2014

Eveline Lemke (June 1964) is former German politician and member of the Alliance 90/The Greens. From 18 May 2011 until 18 May 2016, she was vice minister president of Rhineland-Palatinate and Minister for Economics, Climate Protection, Energy and Regional Planning. On 27 March 2011, she was elected into the Landtag of Rhineland-Palatinate. She was the leading candidate for her party in the 2016 Rhineland-Palatinate state elections along with The Greens faction leader in the Landtag, Daniel Köbler, after having been leader of the party since 2006. As vice minister Lemke represented the state of Rhineland-Palatinate in the German Bundesrat. As author and speaker in green technological issues and Circular Economy, she founded Thinking Circular in 2017. This thinktank is listed in the Sustainable Development Goals Help Desk, a platform by the United Nations since July 2018. She is also working as consultant together with Prof. Michael Braungart, chemist and inventor of the design philosophy Cradle-to-Cradle, Martin Lees (Club of Rome) and David Wortmann (DWR-Eco-Innovation-Alliance).

== Before politics ==
Lemke was born in Hamburg. Her father, Dietrich Lemke, was leader of GEW, a teachers union in Hamburg, whose brother Willi Lemke was Senator in Bremen and Manager Werder Bremen, a famous soccer-club, and later serving as United Nations Secretary-General's Special Adviser on Sport for Development and Peace. He was appointed to the position by United Nations Secretary-General Ban Ki-moon on 18 March 2008.

Lemke graduated in high school 1981 in Burlington, Vermont, and got her German Abitur 1984 in Hamburg, where she added a diploma as Assistant in Foreign Languages in 1985 and a dual training as a steel merchant, which she finished at Carl Spaeter GmbH in 1987. Then she worked for DEUMU Deutsche Erz- und Metall-Union in the steel and scrap business as assistant for the management. She then signed in for studying economics and management at the University in Hanover and finished with Vordiplom in 1993. After a family phase, raising children she entered business life again in 2000, working as consultant for ELZ and for the Green Party Hochtaunuskreis, was elected head of party in Hochtaunuskreis and entered local parliaments there before becoming head of the party in Rhineland-Palatinate in 2006 and entering Landtag of Rhineland-Palatinate and the government in 2011.

Lemke focused on the energy turnaround, renewable energies, land-planning strategies for renewable energies, the founding of an energy agency and innovation strategy for Rhineland-Palatinate. In the center of her work in the Ministry for economy, climate protection, Energy and Landplannin (MWKEL) was a resource-effective industrial policy, the lack of qualified workers, dual training, sustainability and climate protection. Under her leadership an index for well-being was installed.

In 2015 she was elected as head of campaign for running Landtagswahl 2016 together with Daniel Köbler. The Green party entered parliament with 5.3 %. Lemke did not become a member of the following governmental coalition between Social Democrats, Liberals and Greens. She stayed one more year in parliament and left in March 2017, followed by Katharina Binz.

== After politics ==
Lemke was elected as president of the private Karlshochschule International University in Karlsruhe in December 2016 for a period of 8 years. Lemke was also elected to enter the advisory board of ABO-Wind in 2017. In 2017 she finished thesis at the University of Hannover "Zur Bedeutung des Upgrading von Elektroalt- und Gebrauchtgeräten in Deutschland". She in carrying BSc for economics and management. She left Karlshochschule in July 2017 and founded her own consulting company and thinktank Thinking Circular, which became listed on the Sustainable Development Goals Help Desk (United Nations) in July 2018.

== Personal life ==
Lemke is married and has four adult children and one grand child. She lives in Bad Bodendorf.

== Functions ==
- Member of board of the Stiftung für Innovation
- Chair of the board of trustees of Stiftung Rheinland-Pfalz für Innovation
- Member of the board of trustees of the Forum für Zukunftsenergien
- Member of Bundesrat from may 2011 to may 2016
- Member of the board of trustees of AFS Interkulturelle Begegnungen
- Deputy member of the commission „Lagerung hoch radioaktiver Abfallstoffe“
- Member of the supervisory board of ABO Wind AG (since june 2017)

== Publications ==
- 2011, Koalitionsvertrag, Den sozial-ökologischen Wandel gestalten, SPD, Bündnis 90/Die Grünen, Rheinland-Pfalz, Mainz, 101 Seiten
- 2011, Wachstum erreicht immer das Niveau unserer Lebensphilosophie, TOP-Magazin-Mainz, Ausgabe 3, 5. Jahrgang, Mainz, S. 8–10
- 2011, Mit neuen Kompetenzen auf Herausforderungen reagieren in Rheinland-Pfalz, Das Wirtschaftsmagazin, Büro für Publizistik GmbH, Neckarzimmern, S. 4–5
- 2012, Rheinland-Pfalz auf dem Weg zur regenerativen Stromversorgung bis 2030 in 'Ein Jahr Energiewende – Erfahrungsberichte', Forum für Zukunftsenergien, Berlin, Schriftenreihe Band 5, Seite 104–110
- 2012, Die Energiewende ist auch ein Lebensgefühl in 'Bundesländer mit neuer Energie', Agentur für Erneuerbare Energien, Berlin, Jahresreport 2011/2012, S. 134–127
- 2013, Tradition trifft Innovation - Rheinland-Pfalz packt die Zukunft an in 'Wirtschaftsstandort Rheinland-Pfalz', Europäischer Wirtschaftsverlag, Darmstadt, S. 13–17
- 2012, Perspektiven für Rheinland-Pfalz, Nachhaltigkeitsstrategie des Landes, Fortschreibung 2011, Ministerium für Wirtschaft, Klimaschutz, Energie und Landesplanung, Mainz, S. 5
- 2013, Das Morgen Denken, das Morgen gestalten, Regierungserklärung zu Nachhaltiger Wirtschaftspolitik in Rheinland-Pfalz im Landtag, Mainz, Plenum-Protokoll 3354
- 2013, Nachhaltiges Wirtschaften durch Kreislaufwirtschaft in 'Bio- und Sekundärrohstoffverwertung VIII', Witzenhausen-Institut Neues aus Forschung und Praxis, Wieder, Kern, Russen, Witzenhausen, S. 100–106
- 2013, Healthcare Management in Rheinland-Pfalz in Healthcare-Guide, Ghorfa, Arab-German Chamber of Commerce and Industry, Berlin, S. 86–89
- 2014, Die Energiewende als Triebkraft für die europäische Integration in 'Wie kann die Energiewende im Europäischen Kontext gelingen', Forum für Zukunftsenergien, Schriftenreihe Band 7, Berlin, S. 134–140
- 2014, Wirtschaftsförderung für Green Economy in 'Wirtschaft mit Weitblick', ZIRP Zukunftsinitiative Rheinland-Pfalz e. V., Mainz, S. 11
- 2014, Innovationsstrategie des Landes Rheinland-Pfalz in Beschluss des Ministerrates der Landesregierung von Rheinland-Pfalz, Vorlage MWKEL, Mainz
- 2015, Netzumbau ist keine Hürde für Energiewende in 'Bundesländer mit neuer Energie', Agentur für Erneuerbare Energien, Jahresreport 2014/2015, Berlin, S. 122–125
- 2015, Integrierte Energieversorgung auf Basis Erneuerbarer Energien in 'Wie soll das System der Energieversorgung der Zukunft aussehen', Forum für Zukunftsenergien, Schriftenreihe Band 8, Berlin, S. 126–133
- 2015, Der lange Weg zu einem Wertstoffgesetz, in 'Wasser und Abfall 04-2015', Springer Viewer Fachmedien Wiesbaden GmbH, Wiesbaden, S. 4
- 2015, Unternehmen Klimaschutz, Regierungserklärung zur Vereinbarkeit von Klimaschutz und wirtschaftlichem Handeln in Rheinland-Pfalz, im Plenum des Landtages, Mainz, Protokoll 16/108, Ziffer 7135
- 2015, Perspektiven für Rheinland-Pfalz , Nachhaltigkeitsstrategie des Landes, Fortschreibung 2015, Ministerium für Wirtschaft, Klimaschutz, Energie und Landesplanung, Mainz, S. 5.
- 2015, Der ländliche Raum, ein wirtschaftlicher Zukunftsstandort in 'Starke Wirtschaft, starke Regionen', ZIRP Zukunftsinitiative Rheinland-Pfalz e.V., Mainz, S. 17–20
- 2015, Briefe zur Transformation: Flächenverbrauch stoppen: Das Beispiel Rheinland-Pfalz, in Novum Heft 6 „Boden“, Gut Wetter Verlag UG, Forum Ökologisch Soziale Marktwirtschaft e. V., Berlin, S. 6
- 2016, Politik hart am Wind. GRÜNE Perspektiven für ein gutes Leben, Eveline Lemke, Oekom Verlag, München, ISBN 978-3-86581-846-1
- 2019, Renewable Energy Policy Network for the 21st Century (ed.): Renewables in Cities – 2019 Global Status Report, 134 pages, Paris 2019, ISBN 978-3-9818911-9-5 (Sidebar-Author)
