= Daniel Köbler =

German politician (born 1981)

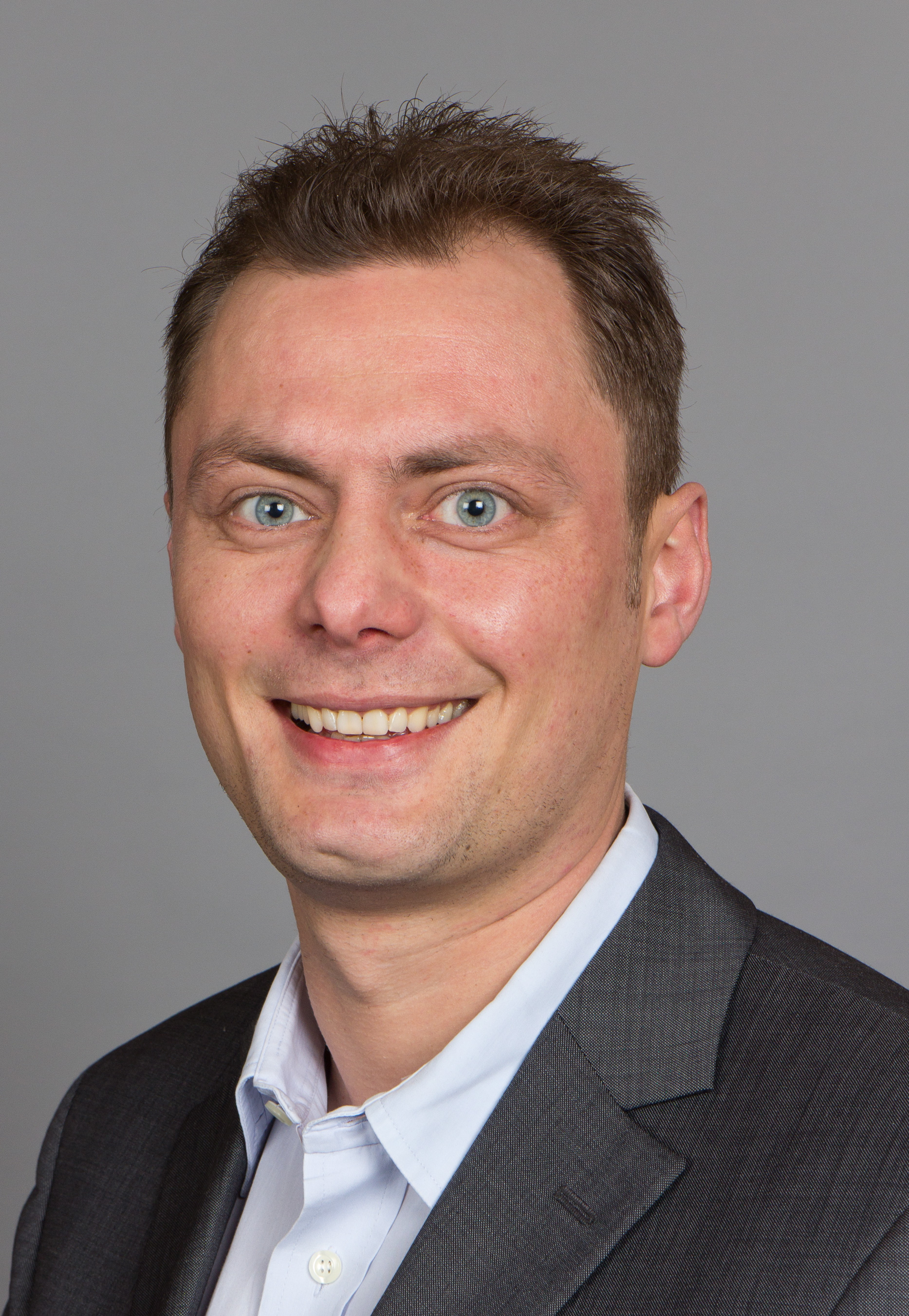
- Köbler in 2014

Member of the Landtag of Rhineland-Palatinate
- Incumbent
- Assumed office 18 May 2011
- Constituency: Mainz I (2021–present)

Personal details
- Born: 3 April 1981 (age 45) Mainz
- Party: Alliance 90/The Greens (since 2001)
- Education: University of Mainz

Daniel Köbler (born 3 April 1981 in Mainz) is a German politician serving as a member of the Landtag of Rhineland-Palatinate since 2011. He has served as mayor of Oberstadt since 2019. On 21 May 2025, the Mainz City Council elected him as Günter Beck's successor as mayor and head of the finance department of Mainz. He took office in February 2026.
