= Herbert Mertin =

German politician (1958–2025)

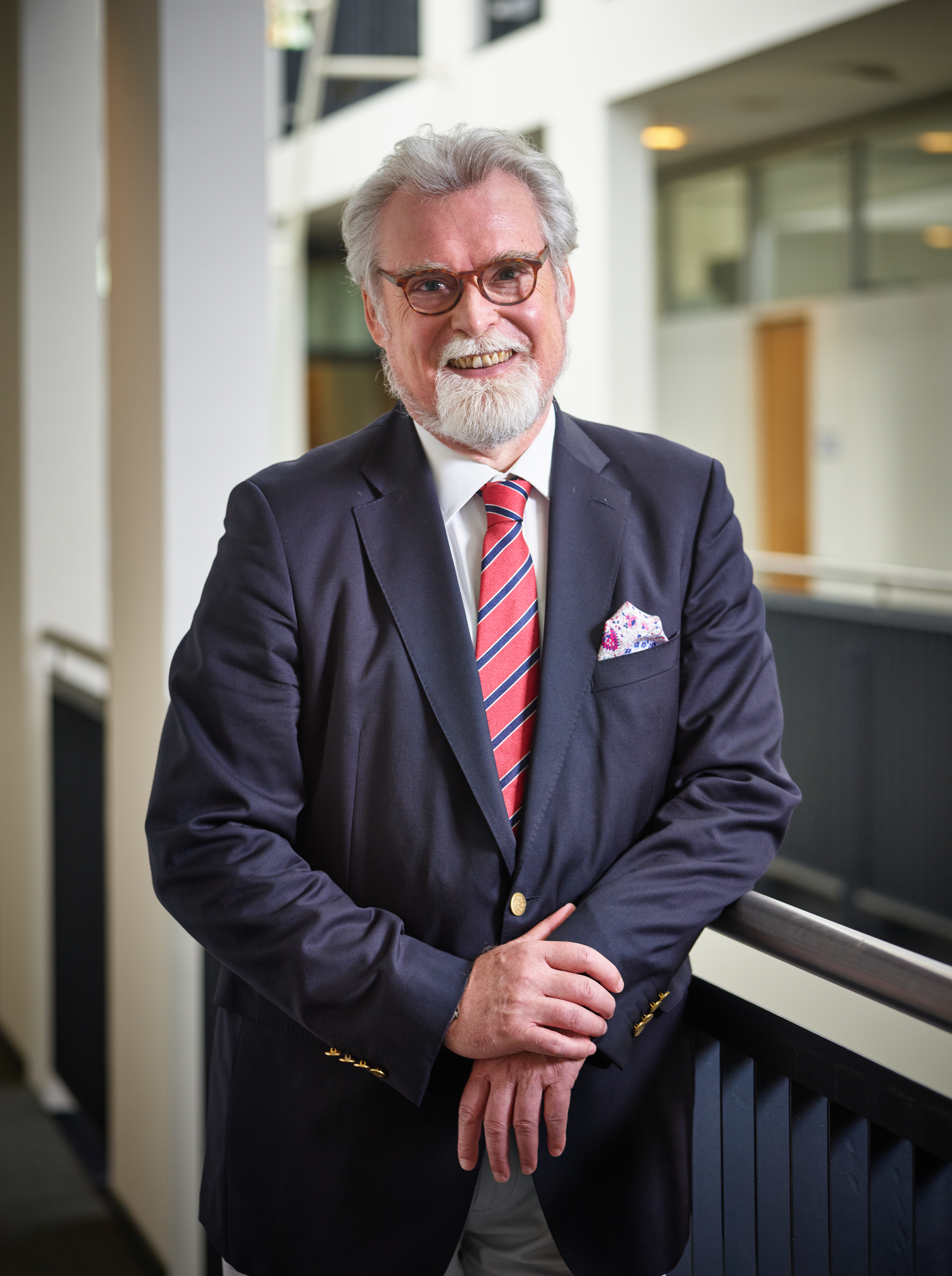
- Mertin in 2021
- Born: 29 April 1958; Temuco, Chile
- Died: 21 February 2025 (aged 66); Koblenz, Rhineland-Palatinate, Germany
- Occupation: Politician
- Years active: 1999–2025

Herbert Mertin (29 April 1958 – 21 February 2025) was a German politician for the FDP and was from 2016 to 2025 minister for justice in the federal state of Rhineland-Palatinate.

== Life and career ==
Mertin was born in 1958 in the Chilean city of Temuco and remigrated in 1971 to Germany.

Mertin became minister for justice in the State Government of Rhineland-Palatinate in 1999 until 2006 and again beginning in 2016 under Minister-President Malu Dreyer.

Mertin died unexpectedly at a hospital in Koblenz, on 21 February 2025, at the age of 66. His death came after he had collapsed at an event being held for honorary judges.
