= Walter Altherr =

German politician (born 1946)

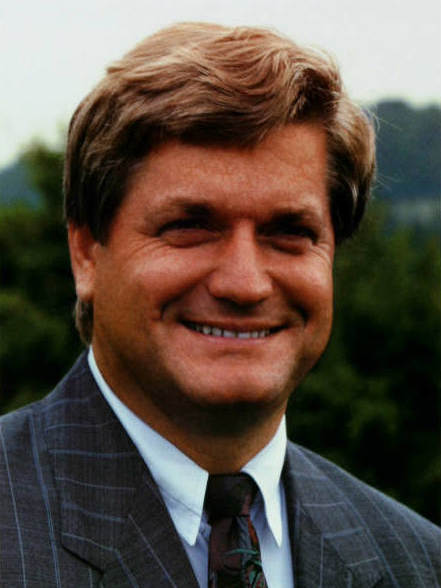
- Altherr on a Bundestag election poster (1994)

Member of the Bundestag
- In office 20 December 1990 – 10 November 1994

Personal details
- Born: 11 July 1946 (age 79) Kaiserslautern
- Party: CDU
- Occupation: Surgeon

Walter Altherr (born 11 July 1946) is a German politician of the Christian Democratic Union (CDU) and former member of the German Bundestag.

== Life ==
Altherr joined the Junge Union in 1961 and the CDU in 1965. In 1986 he became a member of the district executive of Kaiserslautern-Land. 1978 he took over the office of the local mayor of the municipality Mittelbrunn. In 1989 he moved into the district council of Kaiserslautern. In the 1990 Bundestag elections he was elected to the German Bundestag via the Rhineland-Palatinate state list, of which he was a member until 1994. Altherr was a member of the Rhineland-Palatinate state parliament from 1996 to 2006.

== Literature ==
Herbst, Ludolf; Jahn, Bruno (2002). Vierhaus, Rudolf (ed.). Biographisches Handbuch der Mitglieder des Deutschen Bundestages. 1949–2002 [Biographical Handbook of the Members of the German Bundestag. 1949–2002] (in German). München: De Gruyter - De Gruyter Saur. p. 1715. ISBN 978-3-11-184511-1.
