= Roger Lewentz =

German politician

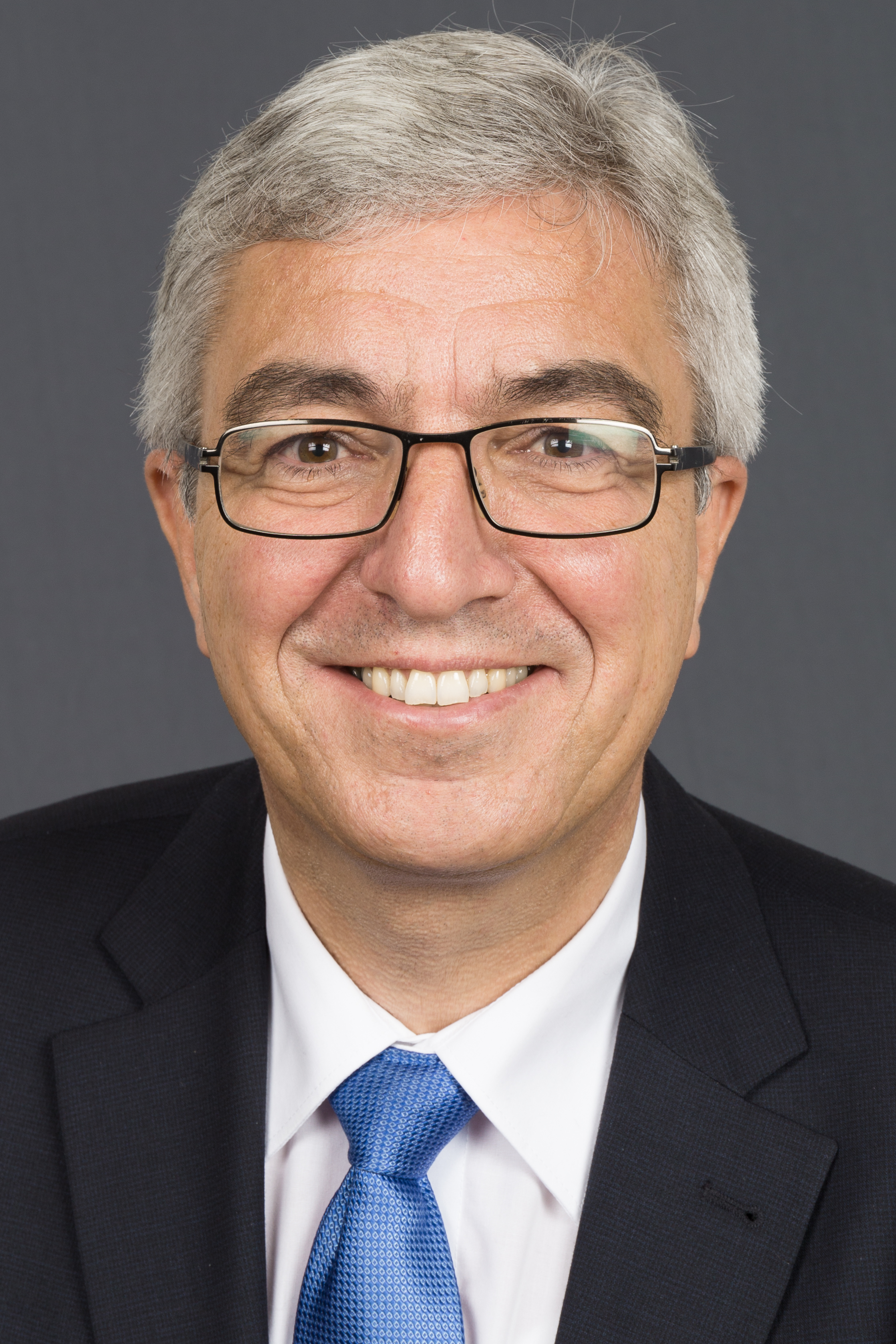
Roger Lewentz

Roger Lewentz (born 19 March 1963) is a German politician of the Social Democratic Party of Germany (SPD) who served as State Minister of the Interior in the governments of successive Ministers-President Kurt Beck (2011–2012) and Malu Dreyer (2012–2022) of Rhineland-Palatinate

== Early life ==
Lewentz was born 1963 in Lahnstein.

== Political career ==
Lewentz became a member of the SPD in 1984. After the resignation of Kurt Beck in 2012, he was elected chairman of the SPD in the federal state of Rhineland-Palatinate.

As one of the state's representatives at the Bundesrat since 2011, Lewentz served on the Committee on Internal Affairs. He was also a member of the German-Russian Friendship Group set up in cooperation with the Russian Federation Council as well as of the German-Polish Friendship Group set up in cooperation with the Senate of Poland.

Lewentz was nominated by his party as delegate to the Federal Convention for the purpose of electing the President of Germany in 2022.

On 12 October 2022, Lewentz announced his resignation as interior minister of Rhineland-Palatinate, a post he had held for 11 years. This was in response to pressure that had mounted in the preceding weeks over the handling by his ministry of the 2021 Ahr valley floods as previously unknown aerial police video footage of flooding scenes had emerged.

== Other activities ==
- German Forum for Crime Prevention (DFK), Ex-Officio Member of the Board of Trustees (since 2011)
