= Landtag of Rhineland-Palatinate =

State legislature in Germany

Landtag of Rhineland-Palatinate Landtag Rheinland-Pfalz

Type
- Type: Landtag
- Established: 4 June 1947

Leadership
- President: Matthias Lammert, CDU since 2026
- Vice presidents: Marion Schneid, CDU
- Jaqueline Rauschkolb, SPD
- Katharina Binz, Greens

Structure
- Seats: 101
- Political groups: Government (71) CDU (39) SPD (32) Opposition (34) AfD (23) Greens (10) Independent (1)

Elections
- Last election: 22 March 2026
- Next election: 2031

Meeting place
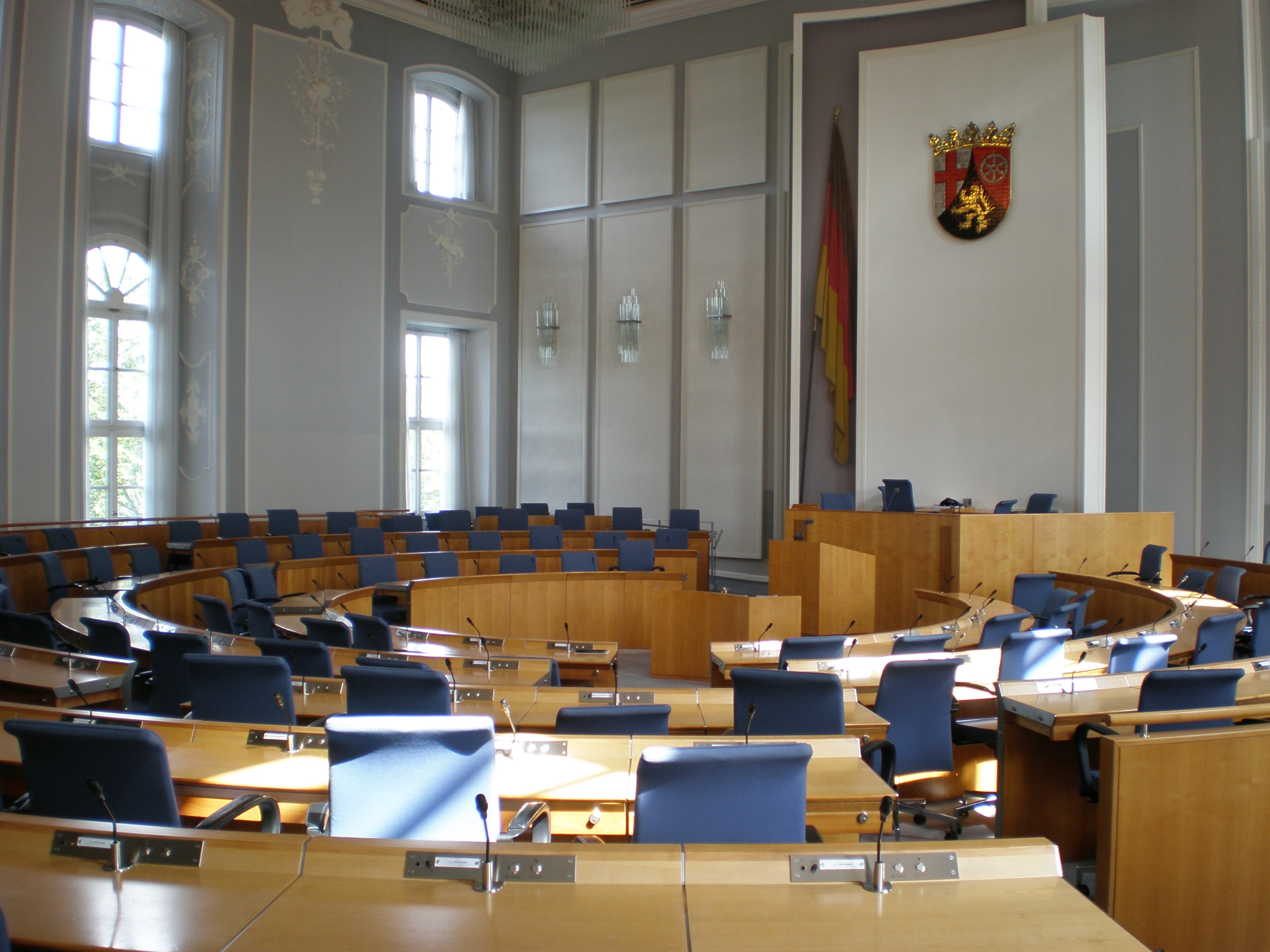
- Deutschhaus, Mainz

Website
- landtag.rlp.de

The Landtag of Rhineland-Palatinate is the state diet of the German state of Rhineland-Palatinate.

Article 79, Section 1 of the Rhineland-Palatinate constitution provides: "The Landtag is the supreme organ of political decision-making, elected by the people. It represents the people, elects the Minister-President and confirms the cabinet, passes the laws and the budget, controls the executive and enunciates the popular will in the conduct of public affairs, in questions of European policy and according to the agreements between the Landtag and the cabinet."

The Landtag consists of 101 members.

The Landtag convenes in the Deutschhaus building, where also the first democratically elected parliament German history had convened, the Rhenish-German national convention of the Mainz Republic. Parts of its administration are located in the old arsenal.

The German flag used in the Landtag is a historical one used during the Hambacher Fest.

== Electoral system ==
The Landtag is elected via mixed-member proportional representation. 52 members are elected in single-member constituencies via first-past-the-post voting. 49 members are then allocated using compensatory proportional representation, distributed in four multi-member districts. Voters have two votes: the "first vote" for candidates in single-member constituencies, and the "second vote" for party lists, which are used to fill the proportional seats. The minimum size of the Landtag is 101 members, but if overhang seats are present, proportional leveling seats will be added to ensure proportionality. An electoral threshold of 5% of valid votes is applied to the Landtag; parties that fall below this threshold are excluded.

== Composition ==
After the elections of March 22, 2026, the composition of the Landtag is as follows:

Party	Seats
**Christian Democratic Union (CDU)**	39
Social Democratic Party (SPD)	32
Alliance '90/The Greens	10
Alternative for Germany (AfD)	24

Political groups in bold support the state's coalition government. Since 2011 the Webster/Sainte-Laguë method is used for allocating seats in party-list proportional representation.

The parliamentary groups are chaired by Alexander Schweitzer (SPD), Christoph Gensch (CDU), Michael Büge (AfD) and Katrin Eder (Greens).

== Presidents of the Landtag ==
- 1947–1948 Jakob Diel, CDU
- 1948–1959 August Wolters, CDU
- 1959–1971 Otto van Volxem, CDU
- 1971–1974 Johannes Baptist Rösler, CDU
- 1974–1985 Albrecht Martin, CDU
- 1985–1991 Heinz Peter Volkert, CDU
- 1991–2006 Christoph Grimm, SPD
- 2006–2016 Joachim Mertes, SPD
- 2016–2026 Hendrik Hering, SPD
- since 2026 Matthias Lammert, CDU

== See also ==
- List of Members of the Rhineland-Palatinate Landtag
