= Schnieder cabinet =

Schnieder Cabinet
- 27th Cabinet of Rhineland-Palatinate
- 18 May 2026 – Present
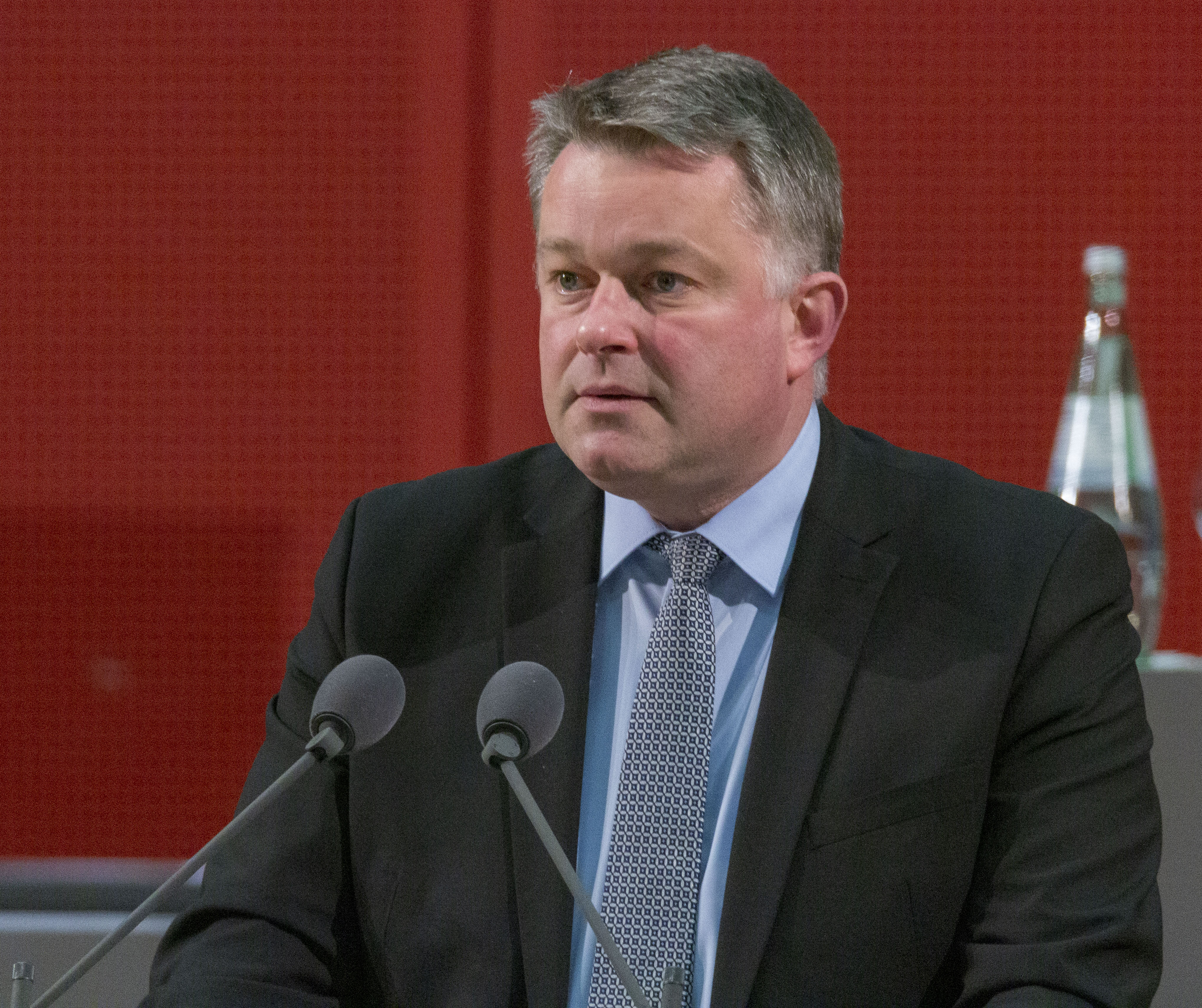
- Gordon Schnieder in 2021
- Date formed: 18 May 2026

People and organisations
- Minister-President: Gordon Schnieder
- Deputy Minister-President: Sabine Bätzing-Lichtenthäler
- No. of ministers: 11
- Member parties: Christian Democratic Union; Social Democratic Party
- Status in legislature: Majority (Coalition)
- Opposition parties: Alternative for Germany; Alliance 90/The Greens

History
- Election: 2026 Rhineland-Palatinate state election
- Legislature term: 19th Landtag of Rhineland-Palatinate
- Predecessor: Schweitzer

The Schnieder cabinet has formed the state government of Rhineland-Palatinate, Germany, since 18 May 2026. The government was elected at the 2026 Rhineland-Palatinate state election on 22 March 2026. Following coalition negotiations, Gordon Schnieder from the Christian Democratic Union (CDU) was elected Minister-President. Subsequently, the cabinet, the first grand coalition in the state's history, comprising the CDU and Social Democratic Party (SPD) coalition partners, was appointed by the Minister-President and confirmed by the Landtag of Rhineland-Palatinate.

== Vote in the Landtag ==
Mainz, 18 May 2026 – Total votes = 105 votes – absolute majority = 53 votes
Election	Candidate		Votes	Number of votes	Portion (votes cast)	Supporters
1. Wahlgang	Yes votes	Gordon Schnieder (CDU)	63	60.0%	60.0%	CDU, SPD
1. Wahlgang	No votes	Gordon Schnieder (CDU)	38	36.2%		CDU, SPD
1. Wahlgang	Abstentions	Gordon Schnieder (CDU)	2	1.9%		CDU, SPD
1. Wahlgang	Invalid votes	Gordon Schnieder (CDU)	2	1.9%		CDU, SPD
Gordon Schnieder was thus elected Minister-President of the state of Rhineland-Palatinate.

== State government ==
Schnieder cabinet
Department	photo	name	Party	State Secretaries	party
Ministerpräsident Staatskanzlei		Gordon Schnieder	CDU		CDU
Deputy Minister-president		Sabine Bätzing-Lichtenthäler	SPD		SPD
Labour, Social Affairs, Women, Family and Youth		Sabine Bätzing-Lichtenthäler	SPD	Kathrin Anklam-Trapp	SPD
Interior, Integration and Transport		Achim Schwickert	CDU	Dirk Herber Interior and Integration; Markus Wolf Transport and Mobility	CDU
Finance		Doris Ahnen	SPD	Fedor Rose	SPD
Justice and Consumer Protection		Helmut Martin	CDU	Anja Schraut	CDU
Agriculture, Viticulture, Environment and Forestry		Christine Schneider	CDU	Kristina Brixius Environment and Forestry; Michael Mätzig Agriculture and Viticulture	CDU
Municipalities, Construction, Housing and Culture		Sven Teuber	SPD	Vanessa Fischer Denis Alt	SPD
Economy, Tourism, Energy and Cimate		Michael Ebling	SPD	Simone Schneider de	SPD
Education		Ute Eiling-Hütig	CDU	Jennifer Groß	CDU
Science, Continuing Education and Health		Clemens Hoch	SPD	Tamara Müller	SPD
Federal and European Affairs, Sport, Voluntary Work and Media; Head of the State Chancellery		Marcus Klein	CDU	Torsten Welling Representative to the Federal Government and for Europe , Sport, Voluntary Work and Media	CDU
