= German Bundesrat =

Legislative body representing the German states

Coordinates: 52°30′33″N 13°22′53″E

German Federal Council Deutscher Bundesrat
- 78th year of business

History
- Founded: 23 May 1949; 77 years ago

Leadership
- President: Hendrik Wüst, CDU since 1 November 2026
- First Vice President: Andreas Bovenschulte, SPD since 1 November 2026
- Second Vice President: Markus Söder, CSU since 1 November 2026

Structure
- Seats: 69 seats

Elections
- Voting system: Appointment by State Governments

Meeting place
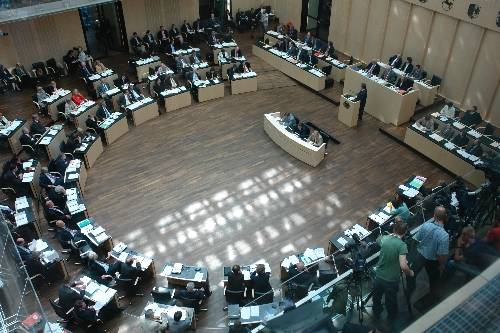
- Former chamber of the Prussian House of Lords, Berlin

Website
- bundesrat.de

The German Bundesrat (German: [ˈbʊndəsˌʁaːt], lit. 'Federal Council') is a constitutional body that represents the sixteen states of Germany (German: Länder) at the federal level. The Bundesrat meets at the former Prussian House of Lords in Berlin at Leipziger Straße. Its second seat is located in the former West German capital of Bonn.

The Bundesrat is part of the legislative branch, alongside the more powerful Bundestag. In this respect, it bears a distant resemblance to an upper house of a bicameral parliament. However, the Bundesrat is a constitutional body distinct from the Bundestag and, more importantly, it is not a parliamentary chamber. Rather, it is an assembly of delegations (from the sixteen state governments) that are subject to an imperative mandate. This particular form of state participation in federal legislation stems from the tradition of similar bodies in the North German Confederation (1867–1870/71), the German Empire (1870/71–1918/19) and the Weimar Republic (1919–1934).

The political makeup of the Bundesrat is affected by changes in power in the states of Germany, and thus by elections in each state. Each state delegation in the Bundesrat is appointed by the state government and has to act in the Bundesrat according to agreements by the state cabinet. The Bundesrat is a continuous body and has no legislative periods. For organizational reasons, the Bundesrat structures its legislative calendar in years of business (Geschäftsjahre), beginning each year on 1 November. Each year of business is congruous with the one-year-term of the Presidium of the Bundesrat. The sessions have been counted continuously since the first session on 7 September 1949. The Bundesrat's 1,000th plenary meeting took place on 12 February 2021 and was opened with a speech by President of Germany Frank-Walter Steinmeier.

== History ==
=== German Confederation ===
The historical predecessor of the Bundesrat was the Federal Convention (Confederate Diet) of the German Confederation (1815–1848, 1850/1851–1866). That Federal Convention consisted of the representatives of the member states. The first basic law (Bundesakte) of the German Confederation listed how many votes a member state had, for two different formations of the diet. The diet was the only organ – there was no division of powers. The diet was chaired by the Austrian representative.

In the revolution of 1848 the Bundestag transferred its powers to the Imperial Regent and was reactivated only in 1850/1851. Several other attempts to reform the Confederation involved retaining the Bundestag and adding a parliament and a court. One of these attempts, the proposed Reform Act of 1863, had introduced the term Bundesrath. With the dissolution of the Confederation in August 1866, the diet and the federal law ended.

=== North German Confederation and German Empire (1867–1918) ===
On 1 July 1867 the North German Confederation was established as a confederal state. The Reichstag, elected by the North German men, was one legislative body. The other one was the Bundesrath (old spelling). This organ was expressly modelled after the old diet. When the Confederation was transformed and renamed Deutsches Reich (German Empire) in 1871, the Bundesrat kept its name.

The imperial Bundesrat had the right of legislative initiative and every bill adopted by the Reichstag (including the budget) needed its consent. It could also, with the Emperor's agreement, dissolve the Reichstag, making it – at least in theory – the more powerful of the two legislative bodies.

Whilst appointed by the state governments just as today, the delegates of the original Bundesrat—as those of the Reichsrat—were usually high-ranking civil servants, not cabinet members.

=== Weimar Republic (1918/19–1933) ===
In the revolution of 1918, the revolutionary organ Rat der Volksbeauftragten ("Council of People's Representatives") limited the power of the Bundesrat to its administrative functions. A Staatenausschuss (committee of states) accompanied the reform of Germany but had no official role in installing the new constitution. Under that Weimar Constitution, ratified on 11 August 1919, it was replaced by the Reichsrat (1919–1934).

The Reichsrat of the Weimar Republic had considerably less influence: It could no longer initiate legislation and could only veto bills adopted by the Reichstag. Such vetoes could be overruled by the Reichstag. However, overruling the Reichsrat needed a majority of two-thirds in the Reichstag, which consisted of many parties differing in opinion. So, in most cases, bills vetoed by the Reichsrat failed due to the lack of unity among the Reichstag's constituent parties. The Reichsrat was abolished by the "Law on the Abolition of the Reichsrat" on 14 February 1934, roughly a year after Hitler had come to power.

=== Federal Republic (since 1949) ===
With the founding of the Federal Republic of Germany after the Second World War and the adoption of the Basic Law as the new constitution, the chamber of states was re-established, again under the name 'Bundesrat'. The new Bundesrat, in terms of its power, occupies an intermediate position between the powerful imperial Bundesrat and the relatively weak Reichsrat of the Weimar Republic. The Bundesrat now once again has the right of legislative initiative and has an absolute right of veto with respect to bills, the content of which directly affects the states; otherwise its vetos can be overruled by the Bundestag. The latter also applies to the federal budget.

== Tasks ==
The position of the Bundesrat (Federal Council) in the political system of Germany

=== Legislative process ===
The Bundesrat is one of three constitutional bodies (along with the Bundestag and the federal government) that have the right of initiative for the legislative process. Legislative initiatives by the federal government must be formally brought to the attention of the Bundesrat, which may respond to them with a statement within six weeks or within three weeks if the government considers the bill to be urgent. The bill can only be discussed in the Bundestag once this statement has been made or the deadline runs out. The Bundesrat can demand an extension of the deadline to nine weeks or, in the case of an urgent bill, to six weeks. If instead the Bundesrat proposes a bill, it must first be submitted to the Federal Government for a statement before the Bundestag can deal with it.

If the Bundestag adopts a bill, it must be forwarded to the Bundesrat. There are two possibilities here:

- If a proposed law directly affects the states or if they would have to participate in its enforcement, it is called an "approval bill": The Bundesrat must approve such a bill by a majority vote in order for it to become a law.
- If the stated condition is not met, one speaks of an "objection bill": Such a bill becomes a law if the Bundesrat does not object to it within 14 days. However, the Bundestag can overrule the objection with a majority of its members (Chancellor majority). If the Bundesrat lodges an objection with a two-thirds majority, the Bundestag can only overrule it with a two-thirds majority.

The two variants differ significantly because, due to the special voting procedures in the Bundesrat, a positive vote is always more difficult to achieve than a negative one. This is because a majority of all possible votes (currently 35 out of 69) is always required for a positive vote. A delegation can only vote yes on a motion if there is a consensus in the respective state government. If such a consensus does not exist (which is often the case, as most state governments are multi-party coalitions), the delegation must abstain, which in effect has the same result as a no vote. In short, for approval bills, a majority must be present in the Bundesrat, while for objection laws, it is sufficient if no majority is formed against them.

Under no circumstances can the Bundesrat amend a bill. However, in the case of "approval laws" in particular, if the Bundesrat rejects a bill, the matter is often referred to the so-called mediation committee, a body made up of an equal number of members of the Bundestag and Bundesrat, which attempts to negotiate whether the bill can find the approval of both chambers with certain amendments. A version amended in this way must then be passed again by a majority in both chambers in order to become law (in this case the rules of procedure of both chambers provide for an abbreviated legislative procedure).

One important difference between the Bundesrat and an upper house in a true bicameral legislature is that the Bundesrat always decides on a bill only after the Bundestag and can adopt it only in the form adopted by the Bundestag – even if the bill originated in the Bundesrat itself. It is even possible for the Bundesrat to first propose a bill and then reject it after the law has been passed in the Bundestag because the majority in the chamber has changed in the meantime.

=== Election of judges to the federal constitutional court ===
The Bundesrat shares responsibility with the Bundestag for electing the judges of the Federal Constitutional Court. Both chambers elect four judges to each of the court's two senates. They also elect the president and vice-president of the Federal Constitutional Court in alternating order. This requires a two-thirds majority, which currently stands at 46 of 69 votes.

=== Emergency powers ===
The Bundesrat also has certain powers that can be brought to use in special states of emergency.

- Article 81 of the Basic Law provides for a state of legislative emergency. This state may be triggered only after a motion of confidence proposed by the Chancellor has failed and the Bundestag has not been dissolved thereupon; if the Bundestag then rejects a bill designated by the federal government as urgent, at the request of the Chancellor and with the consent of the Bundesrat, the President may declare a legislative emergency with regard to that bill. If the Bundestag then rejects the bill again, adopts it in a version deemed by the federal government to be unacceptable, or refuses to act within four weeks, the bill is deemed to have been passed if the Bundesrat approves it. The Basic Law cannot be amended, repealed or suspended, either in whole or in part, by means of this procedure. The state of legislative emergency lasts six months, and any other bill meeting the conditions in that time may be passed in the same manner. Only one legislative emergency can be declared during a Chancellor's term of office.
- Article 91 of the Basic Law provides that in the event of an "an imminent danger to the existence or free democratic basic order of the Federation", the federal government may place the police forces of one or more states under its command and deploy units of the Federal Police to combat the danger. Any order given under this provision may be countermanded by a majority vote of the Bundesrat.

== Seat ==
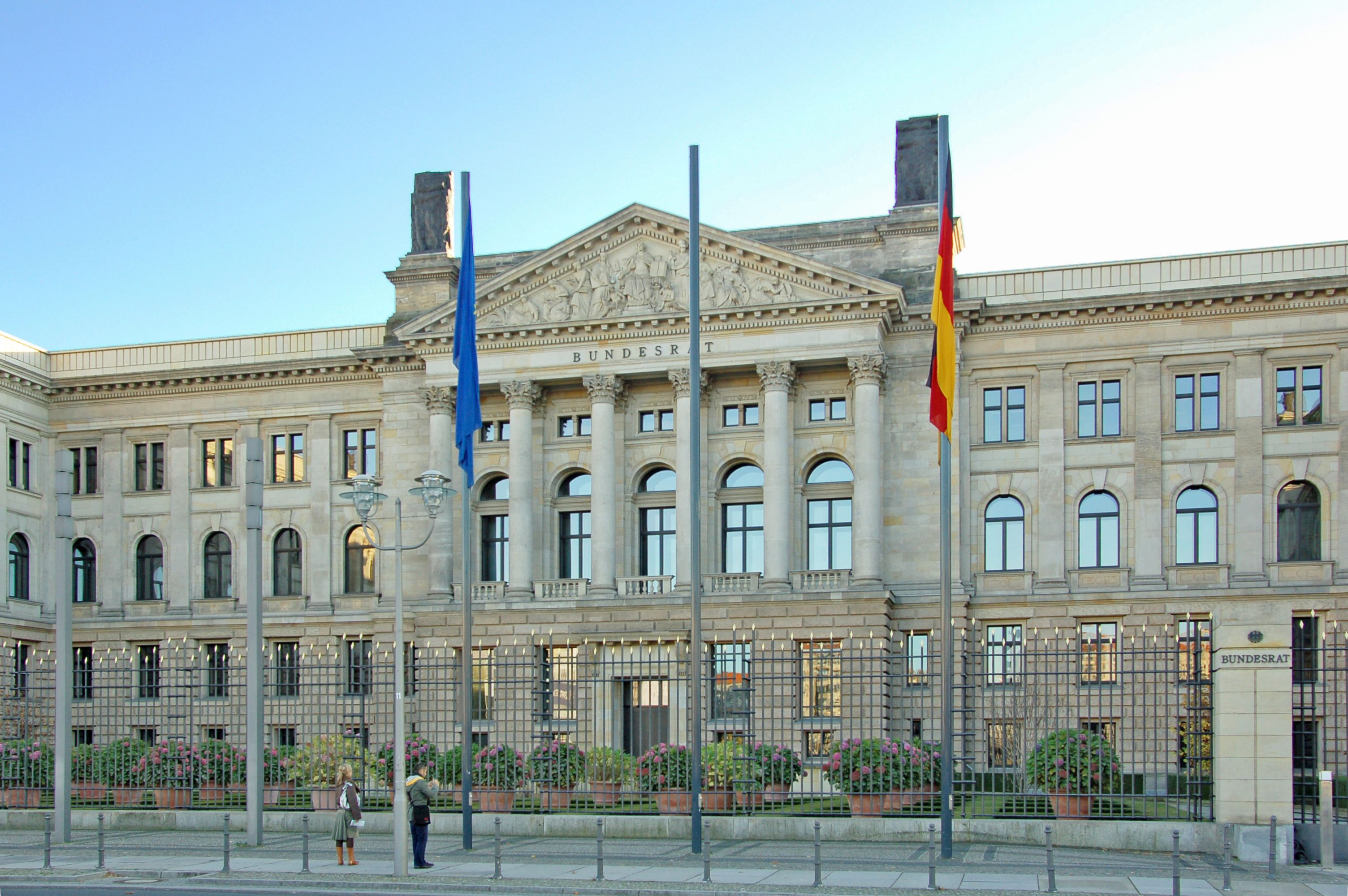
Bundesrat building, Berlin in 2007

From 1894 to 1933, the Bundesrat/Reichsrat met in the same building as the Reichstag, today known as Reichstagsgebäude. After 1949, the Bundesrat gathered in the Bundeshaus in Bonn, along with the Bundestag, at least most of the time. A wing of the Bundeshaus was specially built for the Bundesrat.

In 2000, the Bundesrat moved to Berlin, as the Bundestag had done the year before. The Berlin seat of the Bundesrat is the former Prussian House of Lords building. The Bundesrat wing in Bonn is still used as a second seat.

== Composition and voting procedure ==
=== Historically ===
For the Federal Diet of 1815, the basic law (Bundesakte) established two different formations. In the plenary, for the most important decisions, every state had at least one vote. The larger states Austria, Prussia, Bavaria, Saxony, Hannover and Württemberg had four votes each; eight lesser states two or three, and the remaining 25 had only one vote.

The North German Confederation was a different entity from the German Confederation, but it can also be regarded as the brainchild of a long lasting reform debate within the German Confederation. The new Bundesrat even referred to the old diet in Article 6, when it redistributed the votes for each states. Prussia, originally with four votes, gained the votes of the states it had annexed in 1866, i.e. Hanover, Hesse-Kassel, Holstein, Nassau, and Frankfurt, totaling 17 votes. The total number of votes in 1867 was 43 votes.

When the South German states joined in 1870/71, the revised federal constitutions allocated new votes for them. Bavaria had six votes, Württemberg four, Baden three, and (the whole of) Hesse-Darmstadt three. The total number went up to 58 votes, and in 1911, with three new votes for Alsace-Lorraine, to 61 votes. The Prussian votes remained 17.

To put the Prussian votes in context: 80% of North Germans lived in Prussia, and after 1871, Prussia made up two thirds of the German population and territory. Prussia was always underrepresented in the Bundesrat.

State	Notes	Votes
Prussia	(including states annexed in 1866)	17
Bavaria		6
Saxony		4
Württemberg		4
Baden		3
Hesse		3
Mecklenburg-Schwerin		2
Brunswick		2
17 other small states	each with 1 vote	17
Alsace-Lorraine	after 1911	3
Total		61

=== Weimar Republic ===
The Reichsrat, as a first, had no fixed numbers of votes for the member states. Instead, it introduced the principle that the number depended on the actual number of inhabitants. Originally, states had one vote for every 1 million inhabitants. In 1921, this was reduced to 700,000 inhabitants per vote.

No state was allowed to have more than 40 percent of the votes. This was regarded as a clausula antiborussica, counterbalancing the dominant position of Prussia, which still contained roughly two-thirds of the German population. Also, since 1921, half of the Prussian votes were not cast by the Prussian state government but by the administrations of the Prussian provinces.

For example, of the 63 votes in 1919, Prussia had 25 votes, Bavaria seven, and Saxony five. 12 states had only one vote each.

=== Today ===
Composition of the German states' governing coalitions

The composition of the Bundesrat is fundamentally different from other similar legislative bodies representing states (such as the U.S. Senate). Bundesrat members are not elected — either by popular vote or by the state parliaments — but are delegated by the respective state government. They do not enjoy a free mandate (for example, most privileges in the Bundesrat can be exercised only by a Land, not an individual member) and serve only as long as they are representing their state, not for a fixed period of time. Members of the Bundesrat (suffix "MdBR") do however enjoy the same immunity from prosecution that Members of the German Bundestag have. In addition, Members of the Bundesrat have unlimited access to sessions of the Bundestag (where they have their own benches to the left of the President of the Bundestag) and its committees and can address it at any time.

Normally, a state delegation consists of the Minister-President (called Governing Mayor in Berlin, President of the Senate in Bremen and First Mayor in Hamburg) and other cabinet ministers (called senators in Berlin, Bremen, and Hamburg). State cabinets may appoint as many delegates as the state has votes, and usually do, but may also send a single delegate to exercise all of the state's votes. All other ministers/senators are usually appointed as deputy delegates. In any case, the state has to cast its votes en bloc, i.e., without vote splitting. If a delegation casts inconsistent votes, all of that delegation's votes are invalid. Since every procedural or substantive motion in the Bundesrat requires at least a majority of all possible votes (currently 35 out of 69), in practice, no-votes, abstentions, and invalid votes have the same negative effect.

In theory, it is up to the states to decide how they will coordinate their voting positions. In practice, this is determined in coalition agreements at the state level, and it has become established practice that a state votes "yes" or "no" on a motion if there is a consensus within the respective coalition, and otherwise abstains.

The number of votes a state is allocated is based on a form of degressive proportionality according to its population. This way, smaller states have more votes than a distribution proportional to the population would grant. The presence of the small city-states of Bremen, Hamburg, and Berlin prevents the Bundesrat from having the rural and conservative bias of other similar legislative bodies in favor of small states. The allocation of votes is regulated by the German constitution (Grundgesetz). Each state is allocated at least three votes, and a maximum of six. States with more than

- 2 million inhabitants have 4 votes,
- 6 million inhabitants have 5 votes,
- 7 million inhabitants have 6 votes.

By convention, SPD-led Länder are summarized as A-Länder, while those with governments led by CDU or CSU are called B-Länder.

Current distribution of votes
State	Population	Votes	Population per vote	Governing parties	Last election	Presidency
Baden-Württemberg	10,879,618	6	1,813,270	Greens, CDU	2026	2028/29
Bavaria	12,843,514	6	2,140,586	CSU, FW	2023	2027/28
Berlin	3,520,031	4	880,008	CDU, SPD	2026	2033/34
Brandenburg	2,484,826	4	621,207	SPD, CDU	2024	2035/36
Bremen	671,489	3	223,830	SPD, Greens, The Left	2023	2041/42
Hamburg	1,787,408	3	595,803	SPD, Greens	2025	2038/39
Hesse	6,176,172	5	1,235,234	CDU, SPD	2023	2030/31
Lower Saxony	7,926,599	6	1,321,100	SPD, Greens	2022	2029/30
Mecklenburg-Vorpommern	1,612,362	3	537,454	SPD, The Left, Greens	2026	2039/40
North Rhine-Westphalia	17,865,516	6	2,977,586	CDU, Greens	2022	Current
Rhineland-Palatinate	4,052,803	4	1,013,201	CDU, SPD	2026	2032/33
Saarland	995,597	3	331,866	SPD	2022	2040/41
Saxony	4,084,851	4	1,021,213	CDU, SPD	2024	2031/32
Saxony-Anhalt	2,245,470	4	561,368	CDU, SPD, FDP	2026	2036/37
Schleswig-Holstein	2,858,714	4	714,679	CDU, Greens	2022	2034/35
Thuringia	2,170,714	4	542,679	CDU, Thüringen.Gerecht, SPD	2024	2037/38
Total	82,175,684	69	1,190,952			

While legislative terms of the Bundestag are numbered, with the 21st Bundestag taking office in 2025, the Bundesrat has none, being a permanent institution with membership changes staggered state by state. Meetings have been numbered in a single sequence since 1949: it had its 1,000th plenary meeting on 12 February 2021.

=== Current members ===
The following is the list of current members of the Bundesrat:

State	Portrait	Member	Party	Born	State position	Took office
Baden-Württemberg		Cem Özdemir	Greens	21 December 1965 (age 60)	Minister-President	13 May 2026
Baden-Württemberg		Manuel Hagel	CDU	1 May 1988 (age 38)	Deputy Minister-President Minister for the Interior, Digitalization and Europe	13 May 2026
Baden-Württemberg		Petra Olschowski	Greens	28 March 1967 (age 59)	Minister for Science, Research and Arts	13 May 2026
Baden-Württemberg		Nicole Hoffmeister-Kraut	CDU	9 October 1972 (age 54)	Minister for Economics, Labour and Tourism (since 2021) Minister for Economics, Labour and Housing Construction (until 2021)	12 May 2016
Baden-Württemberg		Nicole Razavi	CDU	20 May 1965 (age 61)	Minister for Transport	13 May 2026
Baden-Württemberg		Rudolf Hoogvliet	Greens	18 August 1958 (age 68)	Representative to the Federal Government State Secretary for Media Policy	12 May 2021
Bavaria		Markus Söder	CSU	5 January 1967 (age 59)	Minister-President (since 2018) Minister for Finance, Regional Development and Home Affairs (2013–2018) Minister for Finance (until 2013)	15 November 2011
Bavaria		Vacant				4 November 2026
Bavaria		Ulrike Scharf	CSU	16 December 1967 (age 58)	Additional Deputy Minister-President Minister for Family, Labour and Social Affairs	21 November 2023
Bavaria		Florian Herrmann	CSU	7 December 1971 (age 54)	Head of the State Chancellery Minister of State for Federal Affairs and Media (since 2018) Minister of State for Federal Affairs (until 2018)	17 April 2018
Bavaria		Thorsten Glauber	FW	21 November 1970 (age 55)	Minister for Environment and Consumer Protection	27 November 2018
Bavaria		Josef Schmid	CSU	27 September 1969 (age 57)	Minister for Justice	6 October 2026
Berlin		Kai Wegner	CDU	15 September 1972 (age 54)	Governing Mayor	2 May 2023
Berlin		Franziska Giffey	SPD	3 May 1978 (age 48)	Mayor (since 2023) Senator for Economy, Energy and Enterprise (since 2023) Governing Mayor (until 2023)	4 January 2022
Berlin		Stefan Evers	CDU	10 October 1979 (age 47)	Mayor Senator for Finance Senator for Culture and Social Cohesion (from 2026)	2 May 2023
Berlin		Cansel Kiziltepe	SPD	8 October 1975 (age 51)	Senator for Labour, Social Affairs, Equality, Integration, Diversity and Anti-Discrimination	2 May 2023
Brandenburg		Dietmar Woidke	SPD	22 October 1961 (age 65)	Minister-President (since 2013) Minister for the Interior (until 2013)	12 October 2010
Brandenburg		Jan Redmann	CDU	16 December 1979 (age 46)	Deputy Minister-President Minister for the Interior and Municipal Affairs	18 March 2026
Brandenburg		Hanka Mittelstädt	SPD	28 April 1987 (age 39)	Minister for Agriculture, Food, Environment and Consumer Protection	18 March 2026
Brandenburg		Gordon Hoffmann	CDU	21 December 1978 (age 47)	Minister for Education, Youth and Sport	18 March 2026
Bremen		Andreas Bovenschulte	SPD	11 August 1965 (age 61)	President of the Senate Mayor Senator for Religious Affairs Senator for Culture	27 August 2019
Bremen		Björn Fecker	Greens	13 December 1977 (age 48)	Mayor Senator for Finance	5 July 2023
Bremen		Nancy Böhning	SPD	25 March 1979 (age 47)	Representative to the Federal Government and for Europe State Councillor for International Affairs and Development Cooperation	19 June 2025
Hamburg		Peter Tschentscher	SPD	20 January 1966 (age 60)	President of the Senate First Mayor	28 April 2015
Hamburg		Katharina Fegebank	Greens	27 February 1977 (age 49)	Second Mayor Senator for the Environment, Climate, Energy, and Agriculture (since 2025) Senator for the Environment, Climate, Energy, and Agriculture (2020–2025) Senator for Science, Research, and Equality (until 2020)	28 April 2015
Hamburg		Andreas Dressel	SPD	6 January 1975 (age 51)	Senator for Finance and Districts (since 2025) Senator for Finance (until 2025)	28 March 2018
Hesse		Boris Rhein	CDU	2 January 1972 (age 54)	Minister-President	31 May 2022
Hesse		Kaweh Mansoori	SPD	12 August 1988 (age 38)	Deputy Minister-President Minister for Economics, Energy, Transport, Housing and Rural Area	18 January 2024
Hesse		Manfred Pentz	CDU	10 March 1980 (age 46)	Minister for Federal, European and International Affairs and Deregulation	18 January 2024
Hesse		R. Alexander Lorz	CDU	30 November 1965 (age 60)	Minister for Finance	18 January 2023
Hesse		Timon Gremmels	SPD	4 January 1976 (age 50)	Minister for Science, Research, Art and Culture	18 January 2024
Lower Saxony		Olaf Lies	SPD	8 May 1967 (age 59)	Minister-President	20 May 2025
Lower Saxony		Julia Hamburg	Greens	26 June 1986 (age 40)	Deputy Minister-President Minister for Education	8 November 2022
Lower Saxony		Daniela Behrens	SPD	12 May 1968 (age 58)	Minister for the Interior, Sports and Digitalization (from 2025) Minister for the Interior and Sports (2023–2025) Minister for Social Affairs, Labour, Health and Equality (until 2023)	8 November 2022
Lower Saxony		Kathrin Wahlmann	SPD	4 August 1977 (age 49)	Minister for Justice	20 May 2025
Lower Saxony		Christian Meyer	Greens	23 July 1975 (age 51)	Minister for the Environment, Energy and Climate Protection	8 November 2022
Lower Saxony		Andreas Philippi	SPD	4 July 1965 (age 61)	Minister for Social Affairs, Labour, Health and Equality	31 January 2023
Mecklenburg-Vorpommern		Manuela Schwesig	SPD	23 May 1974 (age 52)	Minister-President	4 July 2017
Mecklenburg-Vorpommern		Simone Oldenburg	Linke	22 March 1969 (age 57)	Deputy Minister-President Minister for Education and Daycare Facilities	15 November 2021
Mecklenburg-Vorpommern		Bettina Martin	SPD	19 March 1966 (age 60)	Minister for Science, Culture, Federal and European Affairs (from 2021) Minister for Education, Science, and Culture (until 2021)	28 May 2019
North Rhine-Westphalia		Hendrik Wüst	CDU	19 July 1975 (age 51)	Minister-President	27 October 2021
North Rhine-Westphalia		Mona Neubaur	Greens	1 July 1977 (age 49)	Deputy Minister-President Minister for Economics, Industry, Climate Protection and Energy	30 June 2022
North Rhine-Westphalia		Marcus Optendrenk	CDU	21 July 1969 (age 57)	Minister for Finance	30 June 2022
North Rhine-Westphalia		Ina Scharrenbach	CDU	30 September 1976 (age 50)	Minister of Home Affairs, Local Government, Construction and Digitalization	30 June 2022
North Rhine-Westphalia		Nathanael Liminski	CDU	19 September 1985 (age 41)	Minister for Federal, European and International Affairs Head of the State Chancellery	30 June 2022
North Rhine-Westphalia		Oliver Krischer	Greens	26 July 1969 (age 57)	Minister for the Environment, Nature Protection, and Transport	3 February 2026
Rhineland-Palatinate		Gordon Schnieder	CDU	8 July 1975 (age 51)	Minister-President	18 May 2026
Rhineland-Palatinate		Sabine Bätzing-Lichtenthäler	SPD	13 February 1975 (age 51)	Deputy Minister-President Minister for Labour, Social Affairs, Women, Family and Youth	18 May 2026
Rhineland-Palatinate		Marcus Klein	CDU	12 November 1976 (age 50)	Minister for Federal and European Affairs, Sport, Voluntary Work and Media Head of the State Chancellery	18 May 2026
Rhineland-Palatinate		Doris Ahnen	SPD	29 August 1964 (age 62)	Minister for Finance	12 November 2014
Saarland		Anke Rehlinger	SPD	6 April 1976 (age 50)	Minister-President (from 2022) Deputy Minister-President (until 2022) Minister for the Economy, Labour, Energy and Transport (until 2022)	15 January 2014
Saarland		Jürgen Barke	SPD	26 December 1962 (age 63)	Deputy Minister-President Minister for the Economy, Innovation, Digital Affairs and Energy	26 April 2022
Saarland		Thorsten Bischoff	SPD	4 February 1975 (age 51)	Representative to the Federal Government State Secretary for Media Policy	19 May 2022
Saxony		Michael Kretschmer	CDU	7 May 1975 (age 51)	Minister-President	9 January 2018
Saxony		Petra Köpping	SPD	12 June 1958 (age 68)	Deputy Minister-President Minister for Social Affairs, Health and Social Cohesion	19 December 2024
Saxony		Dirk Panter	SPD	7 February 1974 (age 52)	Minister for the Economy, Labor, Energy and Climate Protection	19 December 2024
Saxony		Andreas Handschuh	Independent	1 May 1973 (age 53)	Head of the State Chancellery State Secretary for Federal and European Affairs	19 December 2024
Saxony-Anhalt		Sven Schulze	CDU	31 July 1979 (age 47)	Minister-President	28 January 2026
Saxony-Anhalt		Armin Willingmann	SPD	13 January 1963 (age 63)	First Deputy Minister-President (from 2021) Minister for Science, Energy, Climate Protection and the Environment (from 2021) Minister for the Economy, Science and Digitalization (until 2021)	29 November 2016
Saxony-Anhalt		Lydia Hüskens	FDP	26 March 1964 (age 62)	Second Deputy Minister-President Minister for Infrastructure and Digital Affairs	16 September 2021
Saxony-Anhalt		Rainer Robra	CDU	15 October 1951 (age 75)	State Minister Head of the State Chancellery Minister for Culture (from 2016)	21 May 2002
Schleswig-Holstein		Daniel Günther	CDU	24 July 1973 (age 53)	Minister-President	28 June 2017
Schleswig-Holstein		Aminata Touré	Greens	15 November 1992 (age 34)	Deputy Minister-President Minister for Social Affairs, Youth, Family, Seniors, Integration and Equality	1 August 2024
Schleswig-Holstein		Magdalena Finke	CDU	13 November 1986 (age 40)	Minister for the Interior, Municipal Affairs, Housing and Sports	12 November 2025
Schleswig-Holstein		Tobias Goldschmidt	Greens	16 September 1981 (age 45)	Minister for Energy Transition, Climate Protection, the Environment and Nature	29 June 2022
Thuringia		Mario Voigt	CDU	8 February 1977 (age 49)	Minister-President	13 December 2024
Thuringia		Katja Wolf	TG	7 March 1976 (age 50)	First Deputy Minister-President Minister for Finance	13 December 2024
Thuringia		Georg Maier	SPD	25 April 1967 (age 59)	Second Deputy Minister-President (from 2024) Minister for the Interior, Local Government and Regional Development (from 2024) First Deputy Minister-President (until 2024) Minister for the Interior and Communities (until 2024)	14 December 2021
Thuringia		Stefan Gruhner	CDU	23 October 1984 (age 42)	Head of the State Chancellery Minister for Federal and European Affairs, Sports and Voluntary Work	13 December 2024

=== Party vetoes ===
Due to the unique nature of the Bundesrat’s composition and voting procedures, the power of political parties is measured not so much by their number of members in the chamber as by their participation in state governments. Every state in which a party is part of the governing coalition increases its access to votes in the Bundesrat. This is particularly true when it comes to obstructive voting behavior: In every state where a party is part of the governing coalition, that party can force a (de facto) "no" vote against a substantive or a procedural motion. By contrast, a party has positive control over a state's votes only if it governs alone in that state—which is very rare in Germany's multiparty system.

Thus, the parties that are particularly powerful in the Bundesrat are those that, at any given time, have access to 35 votes, as these parties can block approval bills at any time. During times in which an opposition party holds such a veto, the government seeks its prior approval for legislative initiatives. If an agreement fails, the government tends to shelve laws to avoid appearing incapable of acting.

A prominent example where the agreement of an opposition party was required is the loosening of the German constitution's debt brake under the Merz administration to allow an off-budget economic and military investment package. In 2025, the Greens supported the 2/3 majority needed in Bundesrat, whereas small-government FDP and anti-military BSW blocked the votes of the governments they were in.

Veto power in the Bundesrat (as of November 2026)
Party	Participation in Bundesrat seats
CDU/CSU	51 (veto)
SPD	47 (veto)
Greens	31 (veto, if a two-thirds majority is required)
The Left	6
FW	6
Thüringen.Gerecht	4
FDP	4

== Presidency ==
Originally from 1867 to 1918, the Bundesrat was chaired by the chancellor, although he was not a member and had no vote. This tradition was kept to a degree when since 1919 the Reichsrat still had to be chaired by a member of the imperial government (often the minister of the interior).

Since 1949, the presidency rotates annually among the Minister-Presidents of each of the states. This is fixed by the Königsteiner Abkommen, starting with the federated state with the largest population going down. The President of the Bundesrat convenes and chairs plenary sessions of the body and is formally responsible for representing Germany in matters of the Bundesrat. The president is aided by two Vice Presidents who play an advisory role and deputise in the president's absence; the predecessor of the current President is first, his presumptive successor second Vice President. The three together make up the Bundesrat's executive committee.

The President of the Bundesrat ("Bundesratspräsident"), is fourth in the order of precedence after the Federal President, the President of the Bundestag, the Chancellor and before the President of the Federal Constitutional Court. The President of the Bundesrat becomes acting Federal President of Germany, in case that the office of the Federal President should be vacant.

== Organizational structure ==
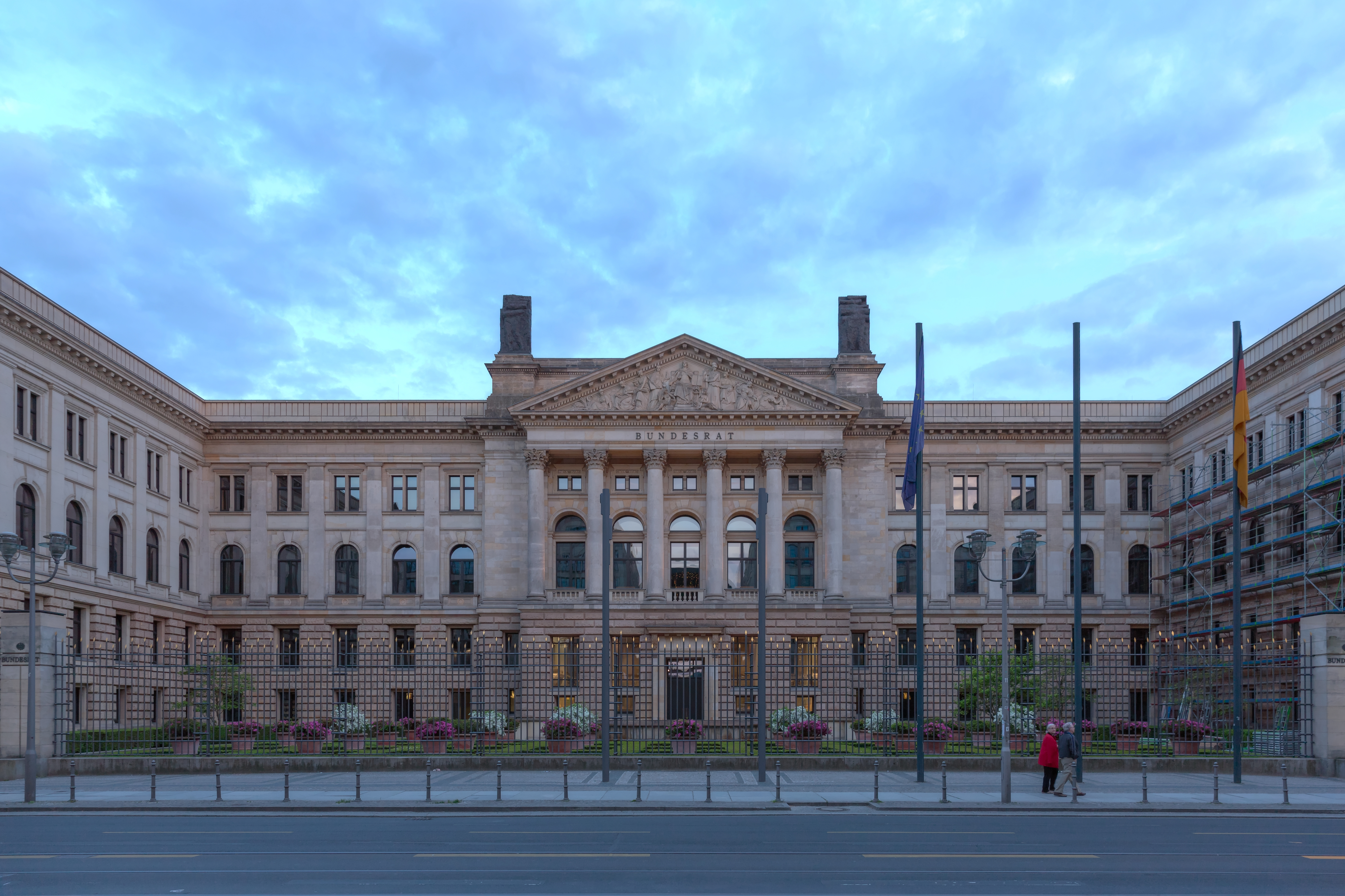
The House of Lords of Prussia on Leipziger Straße, seat of the Bundesrat

Because the Bundesrat is so much smaller than the Bundestag, it does not require the extensive organizational structure of the Bundestag. The Bundesrat typically schedules plenary sessions once a month for the purpose of voting on legislation prepared in committee. In comparison, the Bundestag conducts about fifty plenary sessions a year.

The voting Bundesrat delegates themselves rarely attend committee sessions; instead, they delegate that responsibility to civil servants from their ministries, as allowed for in the Basic Law (art. 52,2). The delegates themselves tend to spend most of their time in their state capitals, rather than in Berlin. The delegations are supported by the Landesvertretungen, which function basically as embassies of the states in the federal capital Berlin.

=== Ausschüsse ===
The Bundesrat has 16 standing committees (ständige Ausschüsse):

- Committee on Agricultural Policy and Consumer Protection (Ausschuss für Agrarpolitik und Verbraucherschutz (AV))
- Committee on Labour, Integration and Social Policy (Ausschuss für Arbeit, Integration und Sozialpolitik (AIS))
- Committee on Foreign Affairs (Ausschuss für Auswärtige Angelegenheiten (AA))
- Committee on European Union Questions (Ausschuss für Fragen der Europäischen Union (EU))
- Committee on Family and Senior Citizens (Ausschuss für Familie und Senioren (FS))
- Committee on Finance (Finanzausschuss (Fz))
- Committee on Women and Youth (Ausschuss für Frauen und Jugend (FJ))
- Committee on Health (Gesundheitsausschuss (G))
- Committee on Internal Affairs (Ausschuss für Innere Angelegenheiten (In))
- Committee on Culture Affairs (Ausschuss für Kulturfragen (K))
- Committee on Legal Affairs (Rechtsausschuss (R))
- Committee on the Environment, Nature Conservation and Nuclear Safety (Ausschuss für Umwelt, Naturschutz und Reaktorsicherheit (U))
- Committee on Transport (Verkehrsausschuss (Vk))
- Committee on Defense (Ausschuss für Verteidigung (V))
- Committee on Economy (Wirtschaftsausschuss (Wi))
- Committee on Urban Development, Housing and Regional Planning (Ausschuss für Städtebau, Wohnungswesen und Raumordnung (Wo))

== Criticism ==
Some observers claim that the opposing majorities lead to an increase in backroom politics, where small groups of high-tier leaders make all the important decisions and the Bundestag representatives have a choice only between agreeing with them or not getting anything done at all. The German "Federalism Commission" was looking into this issue, among others. There have been frequent suggestions of replacing the Bundesrat with a US-style elected Senate, which would be elected at the same date as the Bundestag. This is hoped to increase the institution's popularity, reduce Land bureaucracy influence on legislation, make opposing majorities less likely, make the legislative process more transparent, and generally set a new standard of democratic, rather than bureaucratic leadership.

Other observers emphasize that different majorities in the two legislative bodies ensure that all legislation, when approved, has the support of a broad political spectrum, a particularly valuable attribute in the aftermath of unification, when consensus on critical policy decisions is vital. The formal representation of the states in the federal government, through the Bundesrat, provides an obvious forum for the coordination of policy between the states and the federal government. The need for such coordination, particularly given the specific, crucial needs of the eastern states, has become only more important.

Supporters of the Bundesrat claim that the Bundesrat serves as a control mechanism on the Bundestag in the sense of a system of checks and balances. Since the executive and legislative functions are closely intertwined in any parliamentary system, the Bundesrat's ability to revisit and slow down legislative processes is often seen as making up for that loss of separation.

== See also ==
- Presidium of the Bundesrat
- Federalism in Germany
- Politics of Germany
- Länderkammer
- Composition of the German State Parliaments
- Bundesrat (Austria)
