= Markus Wolf (disambiguation) =

Markus Wolf (1923–2006) was a German spymaster.

Markus Wolf may also refer to:

- Markus Wolf (politician) (born 1980), German politician

== See also ==
- Markus Wolff, German-born American musician
- Marcus Wolf, fictional astronomer in 1998 American science fiction film Deep Impact
