= Ute (given name) =

Ute is a German feminine given name.

People with the name include:

- Ute Berg (born 1953), German politician and member of the SPD
- Ute Christensen (born 1955), German actress
- Ute Eiling-Hütig (born 1967), German politician
- Ute Enzenauer (born 1965), West German road racing cyclist
- Ute Erdsiek-Rave (born 1947), German politician
- Ute Frevert (born 1954), professor of German history at Yale
- Ute Geweniger (born 1964), East German breaststroke and medley swimmer
- Ute Hommola (born 1952), German track and field athlete
- Ute Lemper (born 1963), German chanteuse and actress
- Ute Noack, East German cross country skier
- Ute Oberhoffner (born 1961), East German luger
- Ute Rührold (born 1954), East German luger
- Ute Schell (born 1966), German rower
- Ute Steppin (born 1965), German volleyball player
- Ute Thimm née Finger (born 1958), German track and field athlete
- Ute Vogt (born 1964), German politician
- Ute Wartenberg (born 1963), scholar and numismatist
- Ute Wetzig (born 1971), German diver
