= Katharina Schuler =

German politician (born 1986)

Member of the Landtag of Rhineland-Palatinate
- Incumbent
- Assumed office 18 May 2026
- Preceded by: Dirk Herber
- Constituency: Neustadt an der Weinstraße

Personal details
- Born: 19 October 1986 (age 40)
- Party: Christian Democratic Union

Katharina Schuler (born 19 October 1986) is a German politician serving as a member of the Landtag of Rhineland-Palatinate since 2026. She has served as spokesperson for European affairs of the Christian Democratic Union group in the Landtag since 2026.
