= Presidium of the Bundesrat =

German legislative office

Coordinates: 52°30′33″N 13°22′53″E

The Presidium of the Bundesrat (German: Präsidium des Bundesrates) in Germany is responsible for various functions, including the Bundesrat's budget allocation and other internal matters. The current President of the Bundesrat is Andreas Bovenschulte, the Mayor of Bremen, whose one-year term started on 1 November 2025. The president convenes and chairs plenary sessions of the body and is formally responsible for representing the Bundesrat of Germany. The president is aided by two vice-presidents who play an advisory role and deputize in the president's absence. The three constitute the Präsidium of the Bundesrat.
