= Jan Bollinger =

German politician (born 1977)

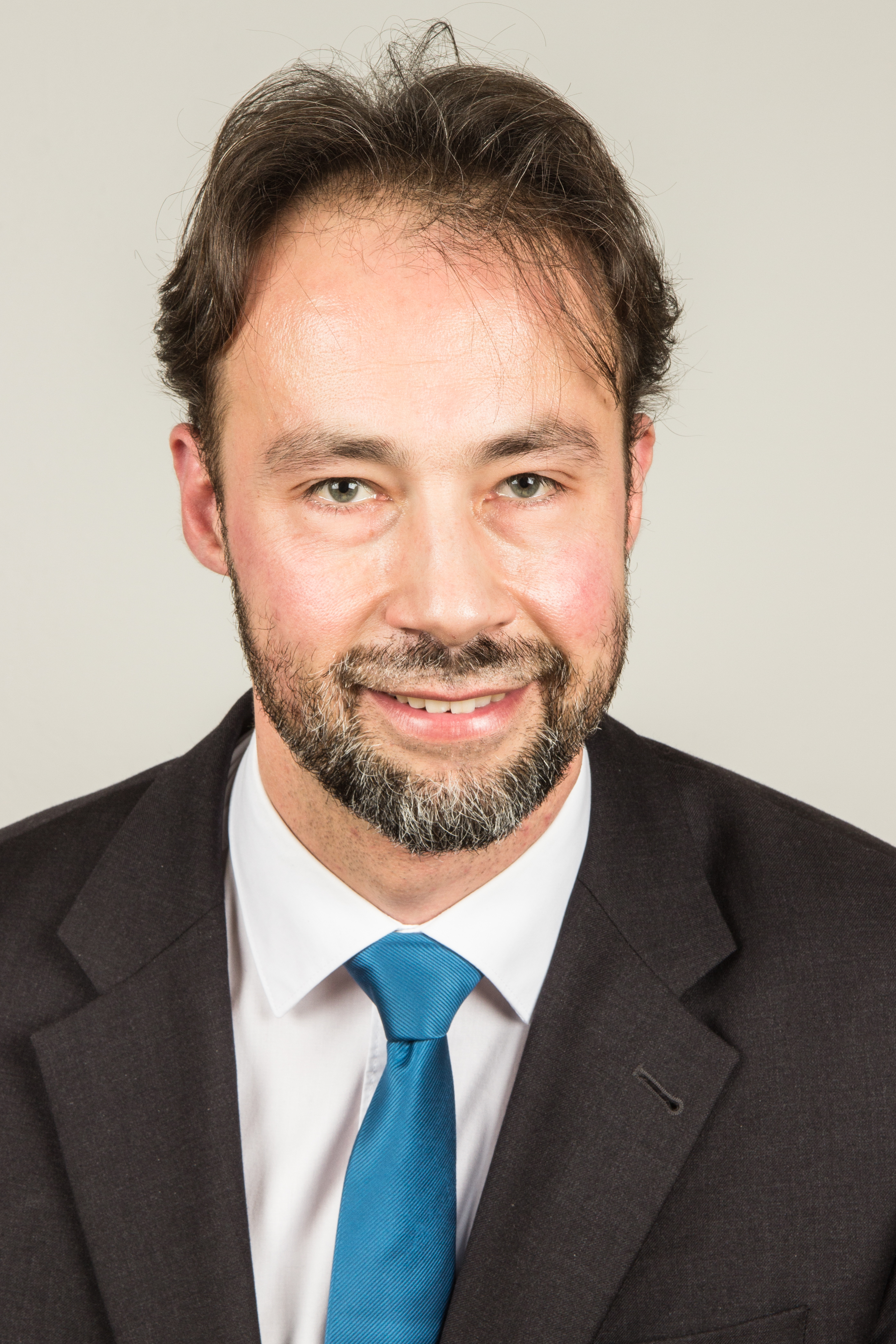
- Bollinger in 2016

Member of the Landtag of Rhineland-Palatinate
- Incumbent
- Assumed office 18 May 2016

Personal details
- Born: 21 March 1977 (age 49) Koblenz
- Party: Alternative for Germany (since 2013)

Jan Bollinger (born 21 March 1977 in Koblenz) is a German politician serving as a member of the Landtag of Rhineland-Palatinate since 2016. He has served as chairman of the Alternative for Germany in Rhineland-Palatinate since 2022, and as group leader of the party in the Landtag since 2024. He is the lead candidate of the party in the 2026 state election.
