= Gordon Schnieder =

German politician

Gordon Schnieder MdL
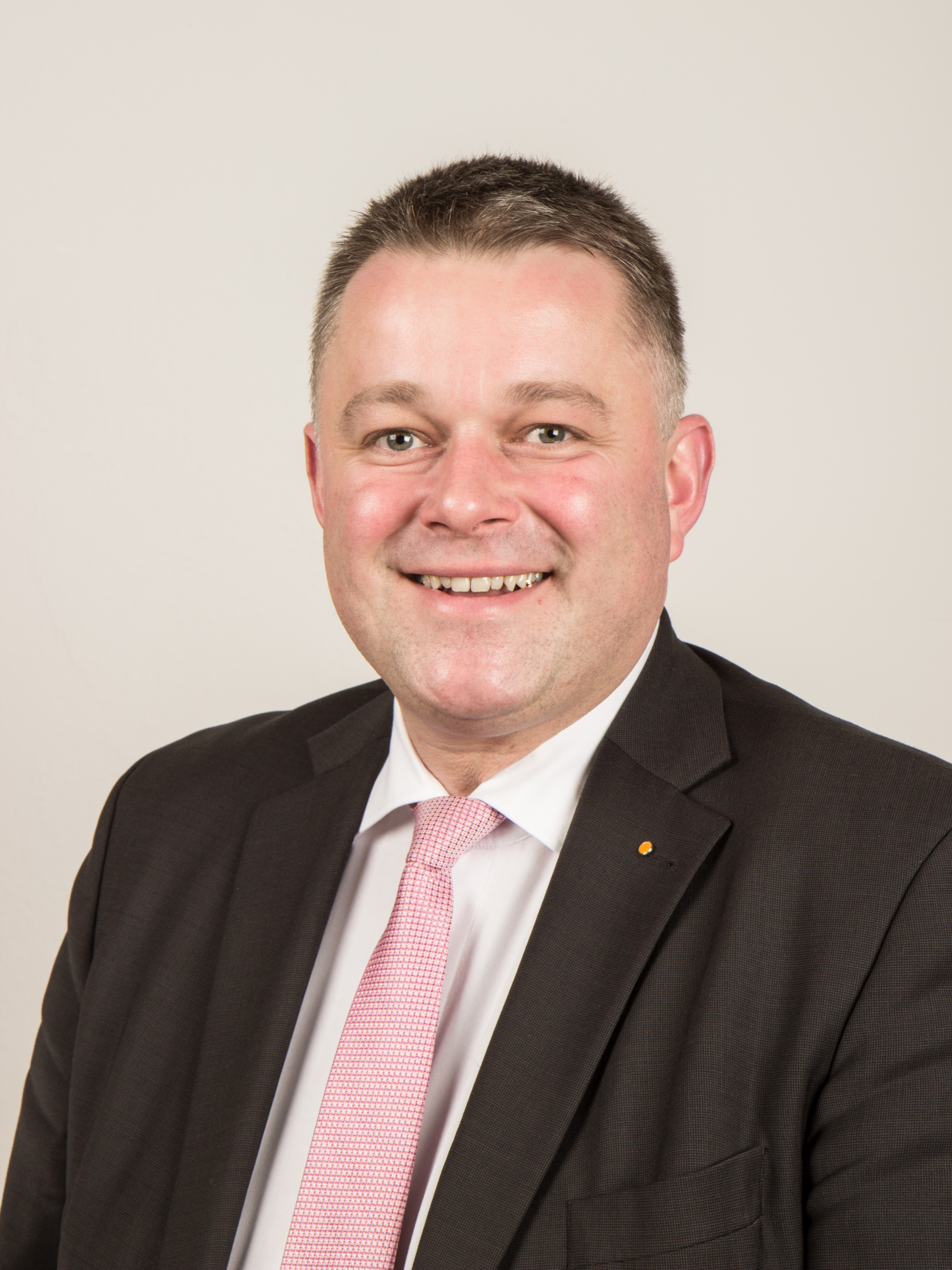
- Schnieder in 2016

Minister-President of Rhineland-Palatinate
- Incumbent
- Assumed office 18 May 2026
- Deputy: Sabine Bätzing-Lichtenthäler
- Preceded by: Alexander Schweitzer

Leader of the CDU in Rhineland-Palatinate
- Incumbent
- Assumed office 21 September 2024
- Deputy: Jenny Groß; Mechthild Heil; Jan Metzler
- Preceded by: Christian Baldauf

Leader of the CDU in the Landtag of Rhineland-Palatinate
- Incumbent
- Assumed office 22 March 2023
- Preceded by: Christian Baldauf

Member of the Landtag of Rhineland-Palatinate for Vulkaneifel
- Incumbent
- Assumed office 18 May 2016
- Preceded by: Herbert Schneiders

Mayor of Birresborn
- In office 2014–2019
- Preceded by: Michael Zander
- Succeeded by: Christiane Stahl

Personal details
- Born: 8 July 1975 (age 51) Trier, West Germany
- Party: CDU
- Spouse: Diane Schnieder
- Children: 3
- Relatives: Patrick Schnieder (brother)

Gordon Schnieder (born 8 July 1975) is a German politician who is the minister-president of Rhineland-Palatinate since 2026. He served as the Leader of the Opposition in the Landtag of Rhineland-Palatinate from 2023 to 2026 and is also the leader of the Christian Democratic Union (CDU) in Rhineland-Palatinate since 2024. He has been a Member of the Landtag of Rhineland-Palatinate for the constituency of Vulkaneifel since 2016.

== Private life ==
Gordon Schnieder was born in Trier and grew up with three siblings in the municipality of Birresborn in the Vulkaneifel district. He is the brother of CDU politician and current Federal Minister of Transport Patrick Schnieder.

After graduating from high school in Gerolstein, Schnieder completed his conscription and then studied from 1995 to 1998 at the North Rhine-Westphalia University of Finance in Nordkirchen. After earning his degree in public finance, he worked in the financial administration of the state of North Rhine-Westphalia until 2001, before moving to the district administration of the Eifelkreis Bitburg-Prüm in Rhineland-Palatinate. There, he worked in the session services department from January 2002 to April 2004. From May 2004 to March 2014, he served as deputy treasurer of the Eifelkreis Bitburg-Prüm. From April 2014 until his election to the state parliament, he served as head of the Municipal Supervisory Authority of the district.

Schnieder lives in Birresborn and is a Roman Catholic. He is married and has three children.

== Political career ==
Gordon Schnieder joined the CDU in 1991. He considers Helmut Kohl his political role model. In 2004, he was elected to the district council of the Vulkaneifel district. Since 2010, Schnieder has led the CDU in the Vulkaneifel district, and since 2013, he has been the party's leader in the district council. In 2014, he was elected mayor of the municipality of Birresborn, a position he held until 2019.

In the state elections of 2016 and 2021, he was directly elected to the Rhineland-Palatinate State Parliament for the constituency of Vulkaneifel.

Gordon Schnieder served as CDU chairman of the Enquete Commission on “Tourism as an Economic and Location Factor in Rhineland-Palatinate” until December 2017. The commission began its work in September of that same year.

From 2017 to 2021, Schnieder served as state chairman of the Rhineland-Palatinate Association for Local Politics, and from 2019 to 2021 as deputy national chairman of the CDU and CSU Association for Local Politics in Germany.

In December 2017, he joined the Interior Committee of the Rhineland-Palatinate State Parliament and became the local government policy spokesperson for the CDU state parliamentary group. In the 18th legislative term, Schnieder was a member of the Interior Committee and the Culture Committee. At the same time, he served as deputy leader of the CDU state parliamentary group. On 22 March 2023, he was elected leader of the state parliamentary group, succeeding Christian Baldauf.

On 21 September 2024, Schnieder was elected leader of the CDU in Rhineland-Palatinate and its designated lead candidate for the 2026 state election. On 15 November 2025, he was officially confirmed as the party's top candidate with 99.5% of the vote.

Schnieder's state CDU was successful at the 2026 election, finishing first and winning more seats than its eventual coalition partner the Social Democratic Party of Germany (SPD), which governed Rhineland-Palatinate alone or in a coalition since 1991. On Constitution Day 18 May 2026, he was sworn in as minister-president and formed the Schnieder cabinet.
