= Manfred Pentz =

German politician (born 1980)

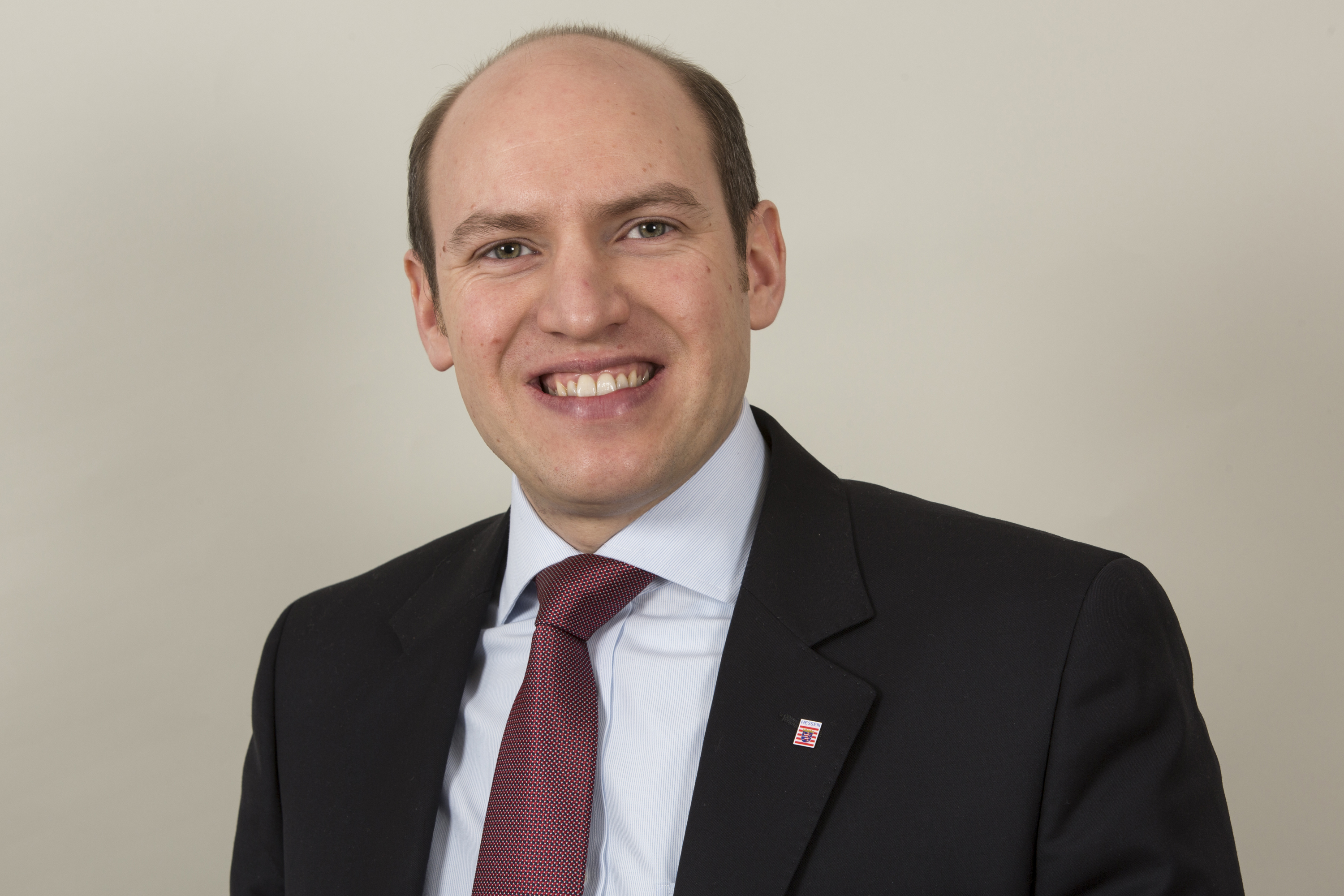
- Pentz in 2013

Minister of Federal, European and International Affairs and Debureaucratization of Hesse
- Incumbent
- Assumed office 18 January 2024
- Minister-President: Boris Rhein
- Preceded by: Lucia Puttrich

Personal details
- Born: 10 March 1980 (age 46) Darmstadt
- Party: Christian Democratic Union (since 1995)

Manfred Pentz (born 10 March 1980 in Darmstadt) is a German politician serving as minister of federal, European and international affairs and debureaucratization of Hesse since 2024. He has been a member of the Landtag of Hesse since 2010.
