= Dirk Herber =

German politician (born 1979)

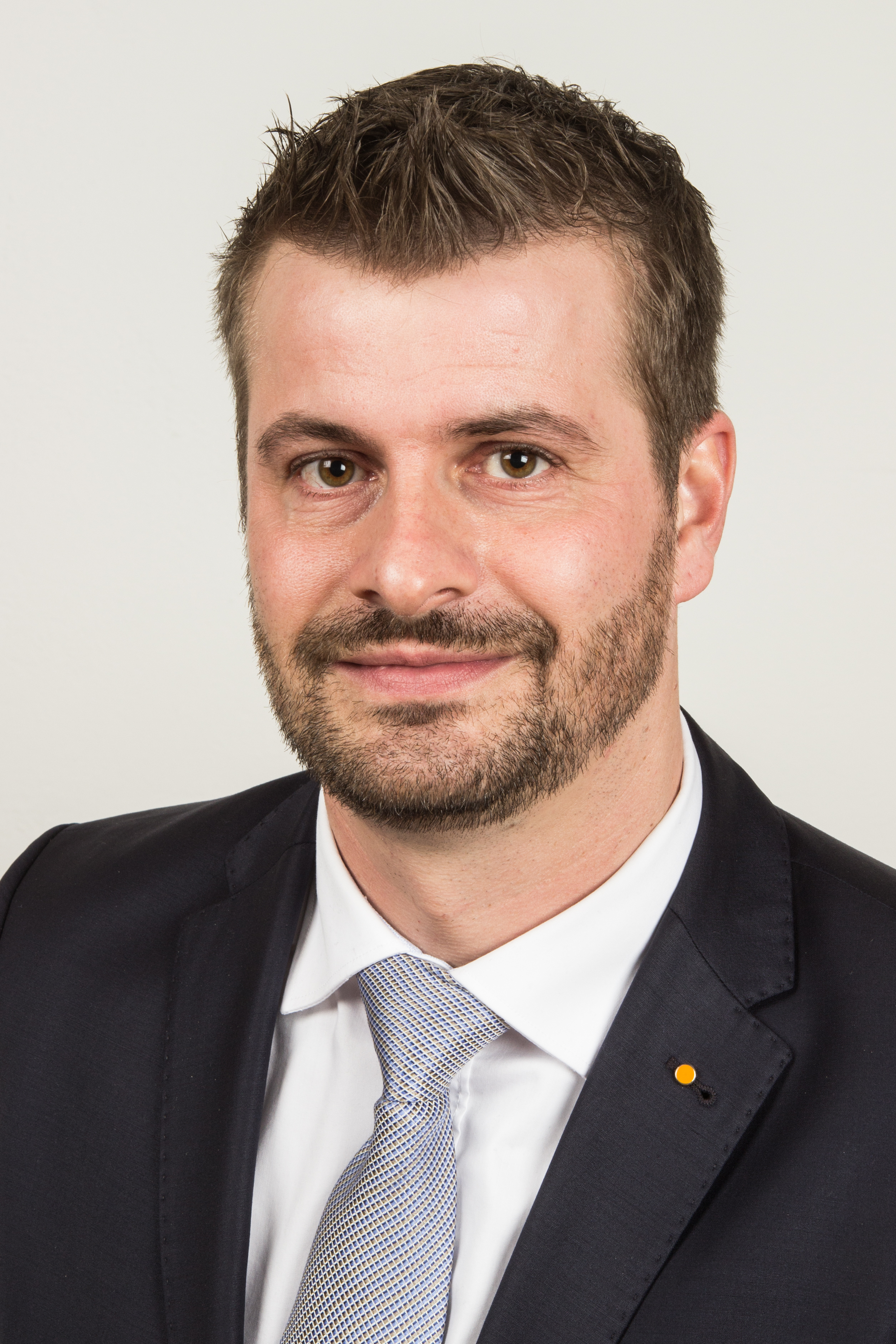
- Herber in 2016

Member of the Landtag of Rhineland-Palatinate
- In office 18 May 2016 – 18 May 2026
- Preceded by: Brigitte Hayn
- Succeeded by: Katharina Schuler
- Constituency: Neustadt an der Weinstraße

Personal details
- Born: 24 September 1979 (age 47)
- Party: Christian Democratic Union (since 2008)

Dirk Christian Herber (born 24 September 1979) is a German politician serving as state secretary of the interior of Rhineland-Palatinate since 2026. From 2016 to 2026, he was a member of the Landtag of Rhineland-Palatinate.
