= Constitution of Rhineland-Palatinate =

The Constitution of Rhineland-Palatinate is the constitution for the state of Rhineland-Palatinate adopted by referendum on 18 May 1947.

The constitution was drafted by the Advisory State Assembly, which met for its constituent session on 22 November 1946 in the Koblenz City Theatre.

== Origin ==
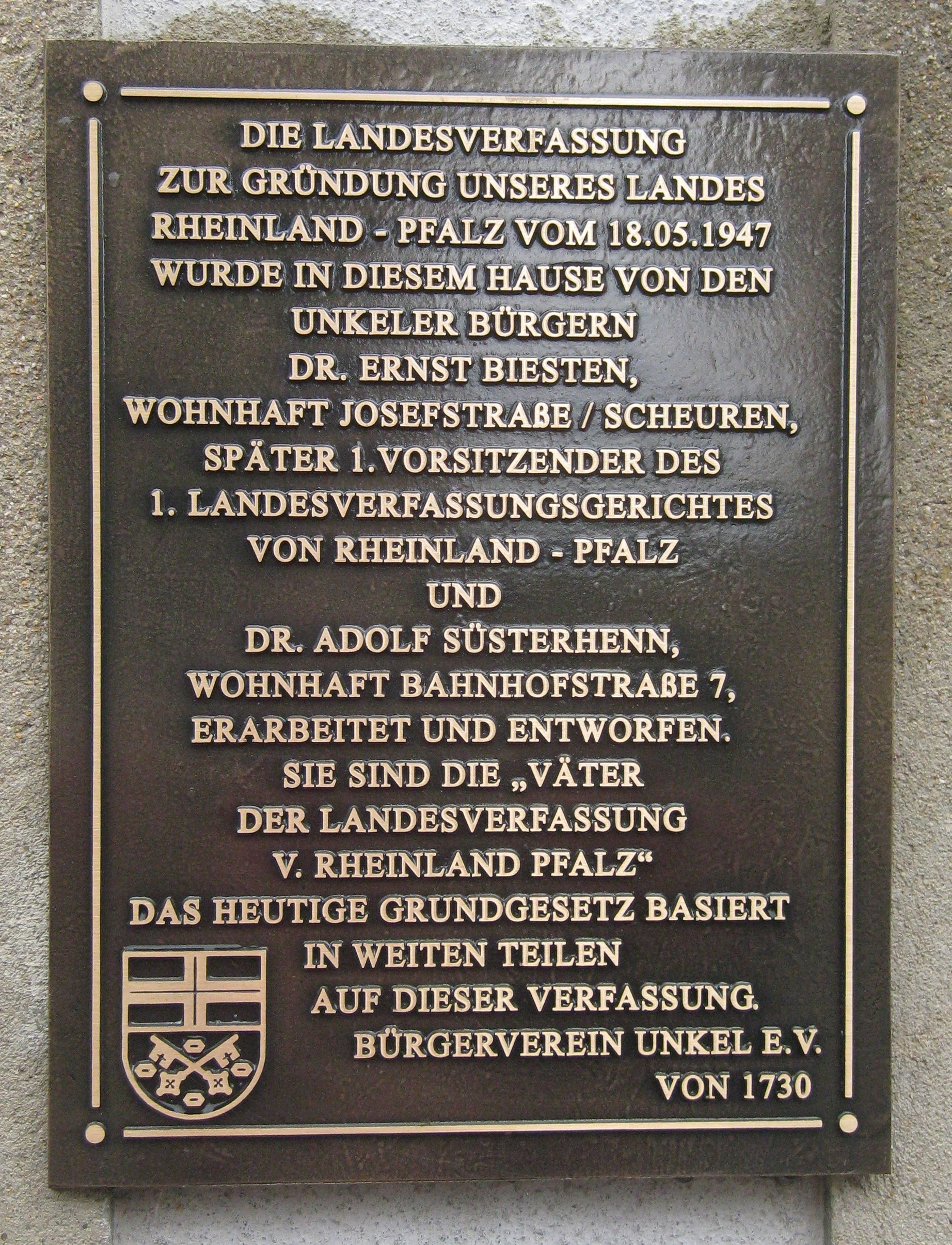
Memorial plaque for Ernst Biesten and Adolf Süsterhenn in Unkel, Bahnhofstraße 7

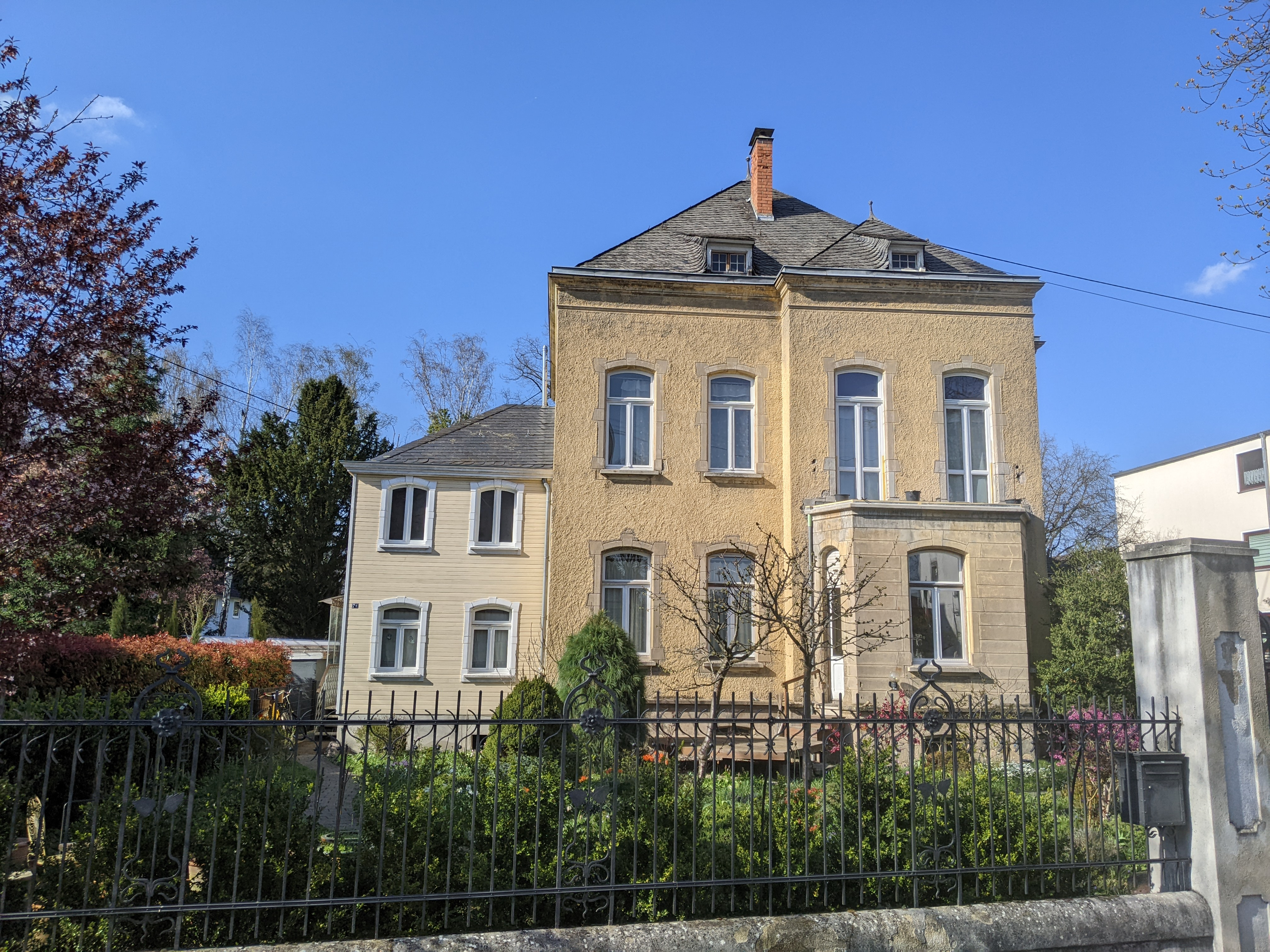
Unkel, Bahnhofstraße 7: the house where the constitution was drafted and amended

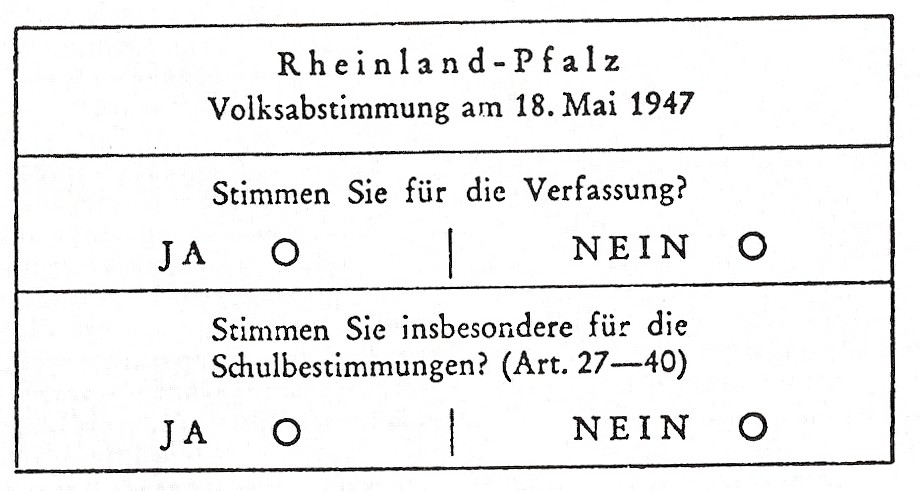
Ballot paper for the constitutional referendum

After controversial discussions, the State Advisory Assembly passed the draft constitution on April 25, 1947, and recommended that the population accept it. Ordinance No. 87 of the French occupying forces stipulated that the referendum on the constitution should take place together with the state elections in Rhineland-Palatinate in 1947 on May 18, 1947. In addition to the vote on the constitution as such, a separate vote was held on Section III of the constitution, "Church, Education and Cultural Care". In the event of the constitution being rejected, the newly elected state parliament would have the mandate to draw up a new constitution.

The constitution was approved by 53% of voters with a turnout of 77.7%. The so-called "school articles" (Section III) were approved by 52.4% with a turnout of 77.4%. The vote revealed large regional (and denominational) differences: In the administrative districts of Koblenz and Trier there were large majorities, in Montabaur there were narrow majorities. In the administrative districts of Rheinhessen and Pfalz the constitution was rejected by a majority. The following constitutional questions were controversially discussed:

- In school policy (this was the subject of the separate vote), the question of Christian denominational schools was a key issue. While the CDU demanded that parents be given the freedom to choose between denominational schools and integrated schools (and pushed this through in the draft constitution), the Social Democrats, Communists and Liberals agreed to enshrine combined schools as a unified school in the constitution.
- The Social Democrats rejected the creation of the state of Rhineland-Palatinate and therefore called for the rejection of the constitution. The school article was also rejected. This would allow the Catholic minority in small communities to demand a denominational school. This would effectively make the simultaneous school the denominational school of the Protestant majority.
- The KPD demanded that land reform and the socialization of enterprises be included in the constitution and rejected the constitution because it did not contain these provisions.
- The liberal parties called for the adoption of the constitution but for the rejection of the school articles.In the pastoral letter of the Protestant church leadership of May 8, 1947, and in the pastoral letter of the Catholic bishops of April 27, 1947, the adoption of the constitution and the school article was called for.

The French occupying authorities were negative about the retention of denominational schools due to France's secular tradition. After the Union had made it clear that without the anchoring of denominational schools, the constitution would not receive a majority in the Advisory State Assembly, the occupying power had to accept this constitutional provision and in return forced a separate vote on this provision. The religious schools in Rhineland-Palatinate existed as regular schools until 1968.

== Preface and structure of the Constitution ==
=== Preface ===
Conscious of their responsibility before God, the original source of law and creator of all human communities, inspired by the will to safeguard human freedom and dignity, to organize community life according to the principle of social justice, to promote economic progress for all and to form a new democratic Germany as a living member of the international community, the people of Rhineland-Palatinate have given themselves this constitution:

=== First main part: Fundamental rights and duties ===
Section I: The individual

1. Civil liberties
2. Equality rights
3. Public duties

Section II: Marriage and family

Section III: School, education and cultural activities

Section IV: Churches and religious communities

Section V: Self-government of municipalities and municipal associations

Section VI: The economic and social order

Section VII: Protection of the natural foundations of life

=== Second main part: Structure and tasks of the state ===
Section: The foundations of the state Section II: Organs of the people's will

1. The State Parliament
2. The State GovernmentSection III: Legislation

Section IV: Finance

Section V: Jurisprudence

Section VI: Administration

Section VII: Protection of the Constitution and the Constitutional Court

Section VIII: Transitional and final provisions

== Capital punishment ==
After the end of the Third Reich, the death penalty was adopted into Rhineland-Palatinate law. Article 3 of the state constitution of May 18, 1947 stated: "Human life is inviolable. It can only be declared forfeited by a judge on the basis of the law as punishment for the most serious crimes against life and limb. [...]" Between 1945 and 1949, eight people were sentenced to death by the Rhineland-Palatinate courts; however, the sentences were not carried out due to the lack of a guillotine. This "Rhineland-Palatinate guillotine" was only completed and ready for use five days after the Parliamentary Council's decision to abolish the death penalty. Since it was never used, the guillotine is now in the House of History in Bonn. The death penalty was not removed from the state constitution until March 15, 1991.

Adolf Süsterhenn, Rhineland-Palatinate Justice Minister from 1946 until 1951 and “intellectual father of the state constitution”, was a supporter of the death penalty.

== Literature ==
- Christoph Grimm/Peter Caesar: Verfassung für Rheinland-Pfalz. Kommentar. Nomos Verlagsgesellschaft, Baden-Baden 2001.
- Lars Brocker/Michael Droege/Siegfried Jutzi: Verfassung für Rheinland-Pfalz. Kommentar. Nomos Verlagsgesellschaft, Baden-Baden 2014.
- Praxis der Kommunalverwaltung Rheinland-Pfalz, Verfassung für Rheinland-Pfalz, Kommentar von Marc Lahmann, Udo Hans, Dr. Klaus Korger
