= 2026 Rhineland-Palatinate state election =

German state election

- 22 March 2026

All 105 seats in the Landtag of Rhineland-Palatinate, including 4 overhang and leveling seats 53 seats needed for a majority
- Turnout: 2,046,542 (68.4%) ▲4.1%
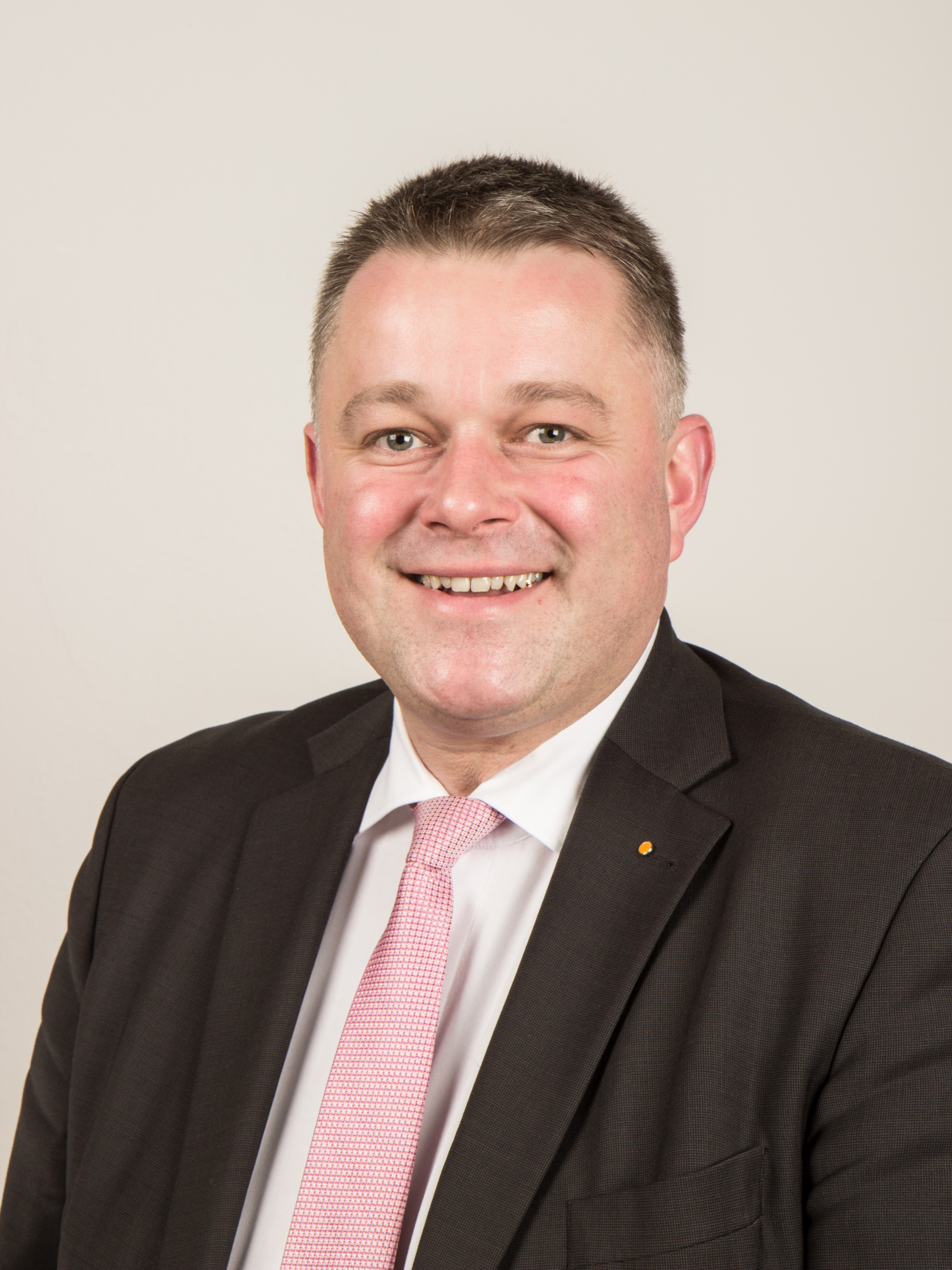

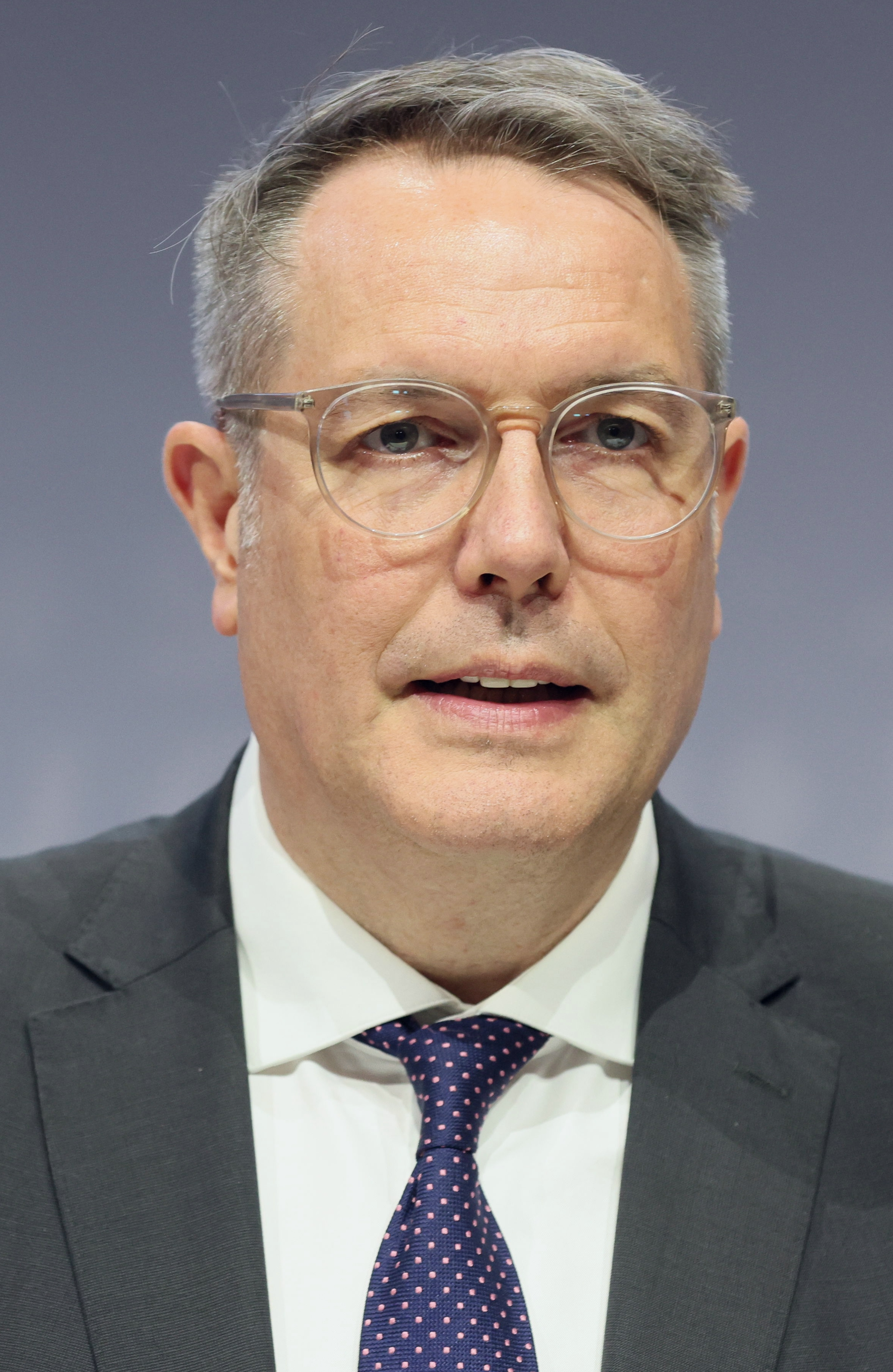

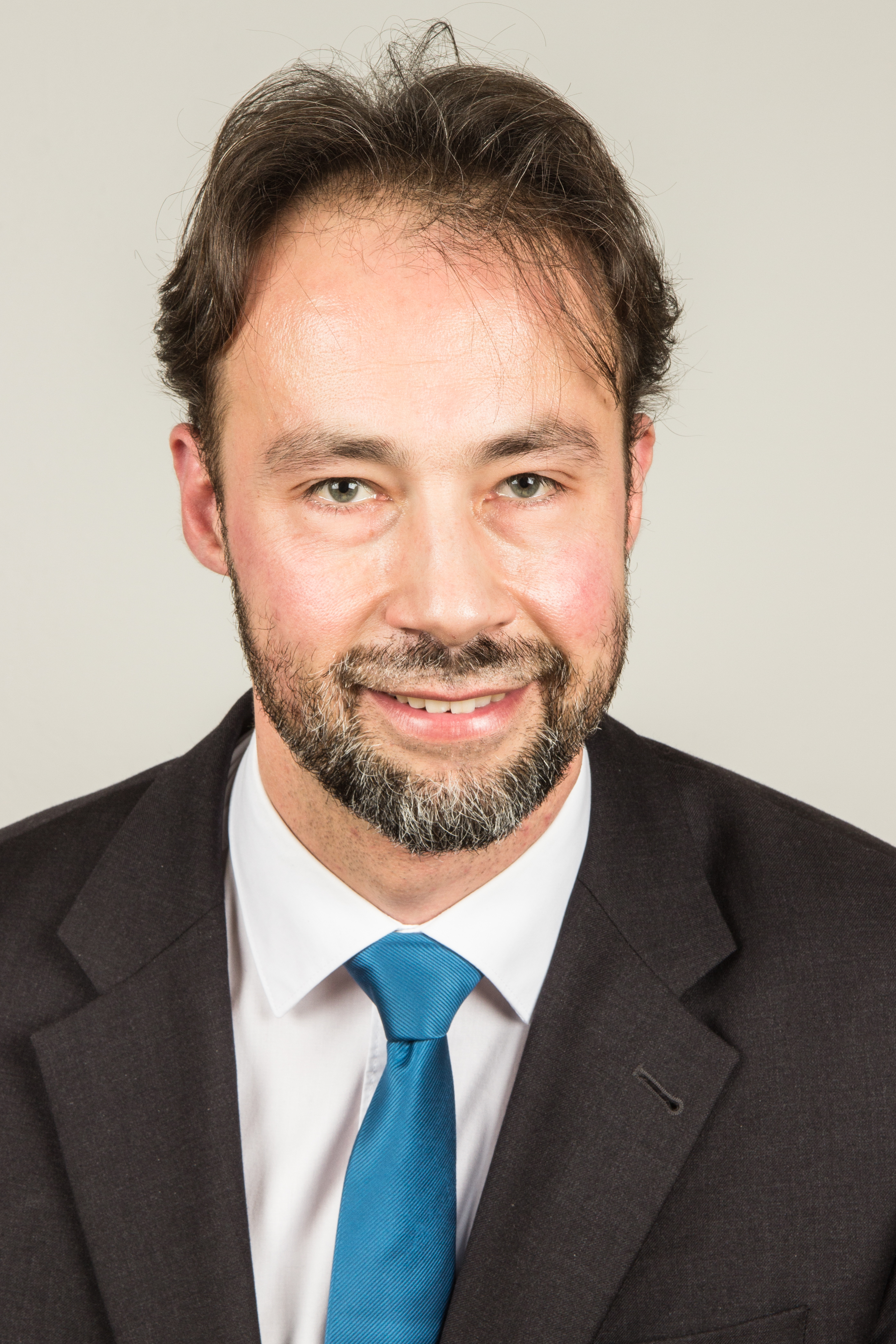

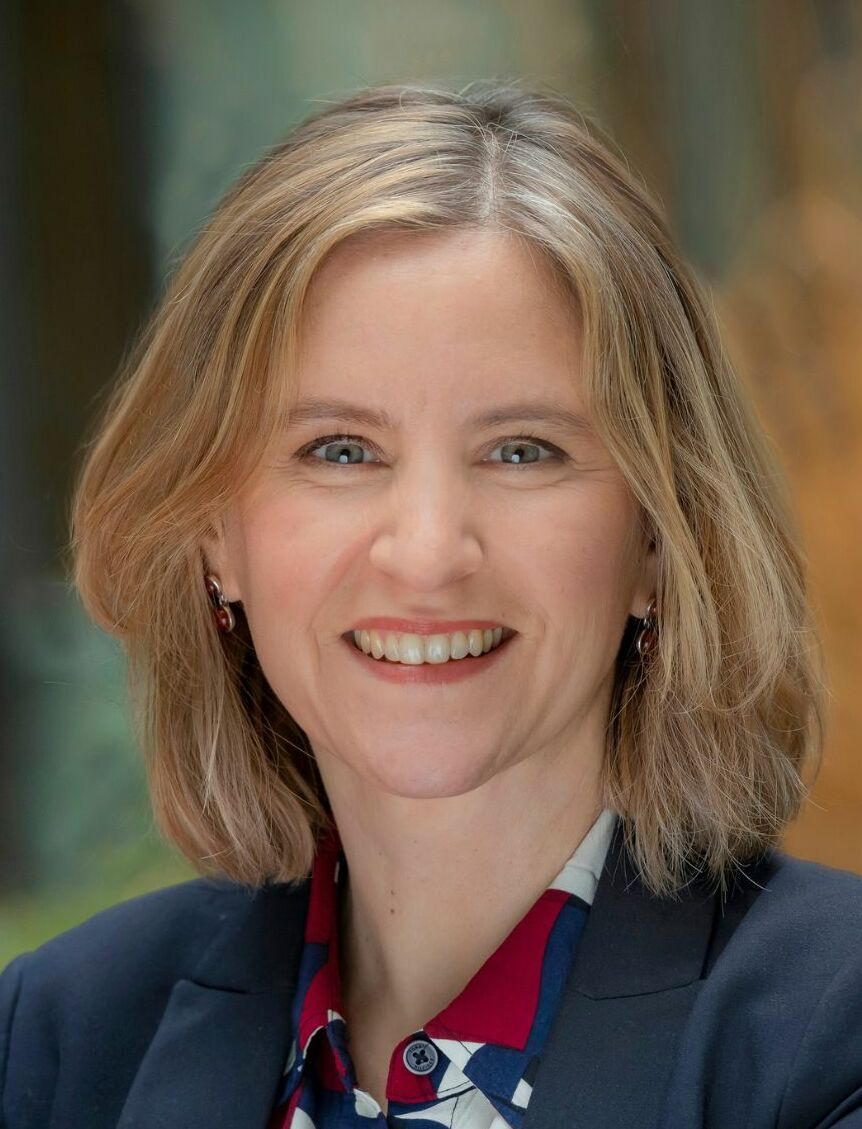

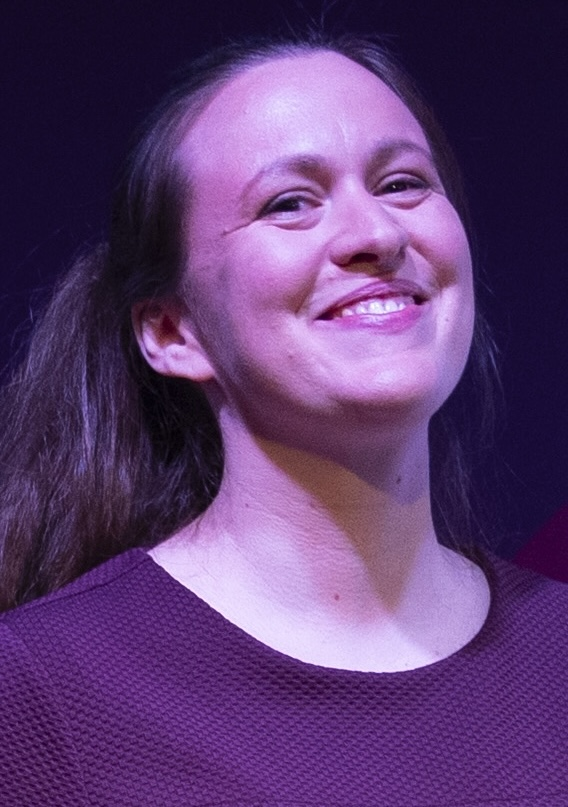

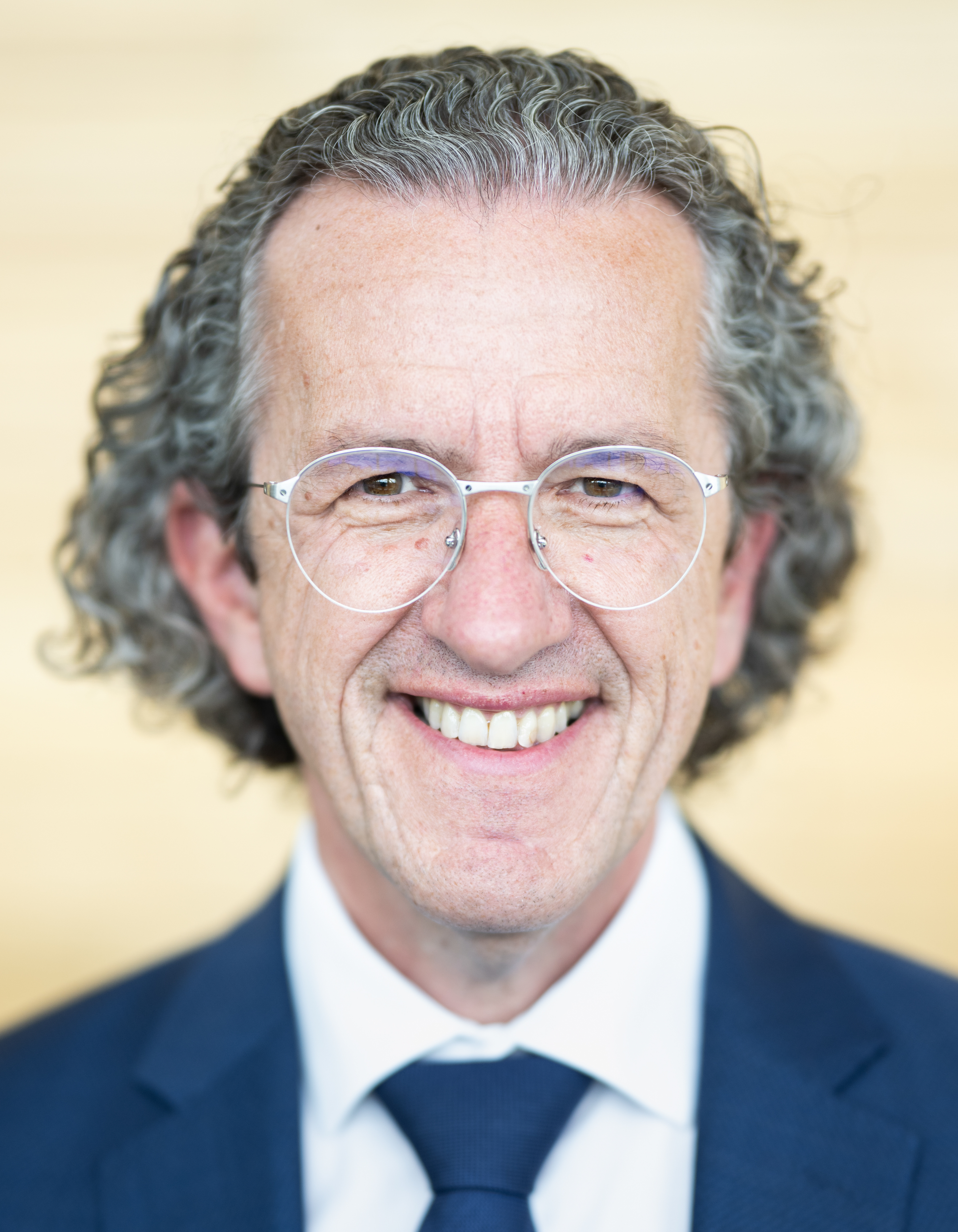

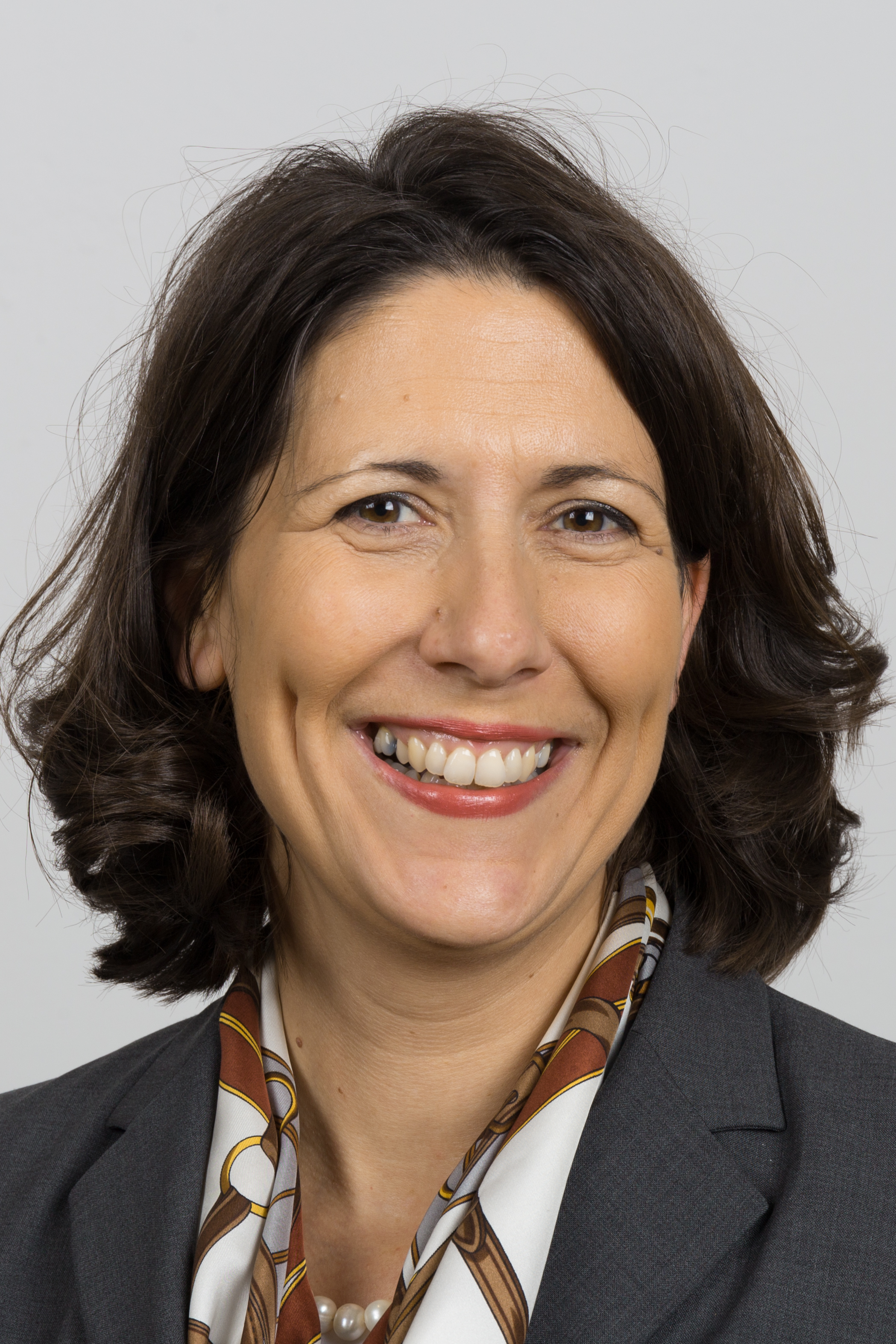
	First party	Second party	Third party
Candidate	Gordon Schnieder	Alexander Schweitzer	Jan Bollinger
Party	CDU	SPD	AfD
Last election	31 seats, 27.7%	39 seats, 35.7%	9 seats, 8.3%
Seats won	39	32	24
Seat change	▲8	▼7	▲15
Popular vote	627,954	525,807	394,756
Percentage	31.0%	25.9%	19.5%
Swing	▲3.3%	▼9.8%	▲11.2%
	Fourth party	Fifth party	Sixth party
Candidate	Katrin Eder	Rebecca Ruppert	Joachim Streit
Party	Greens	Linke	FW
Last election	10 seats, 9.3%	0 seats, 2.5%	6 seats, 5.4%
Seats won	10	0	0
Seat change	0	0	▼6
Popular vote	160,073	88,983	85,972
Percentage	7.9%	4.4%	4.2%
Swing	▼1.4%	▲1.9%	▼1.2%
	Seventh party
Candidate	Daniela Schmitt
Party	FDP
Last election	6 seats, 5.5%
Seats won	0
Seat change	▼6
Popular vote	42,063
Percentage	2.1%
Swing	▼3.4%
- Results for the single-member constituencies
Government before election
Schweitzer cabinet
SPD–Green–FDP
Government after election
Schnieder cabinet
CDU-SPD

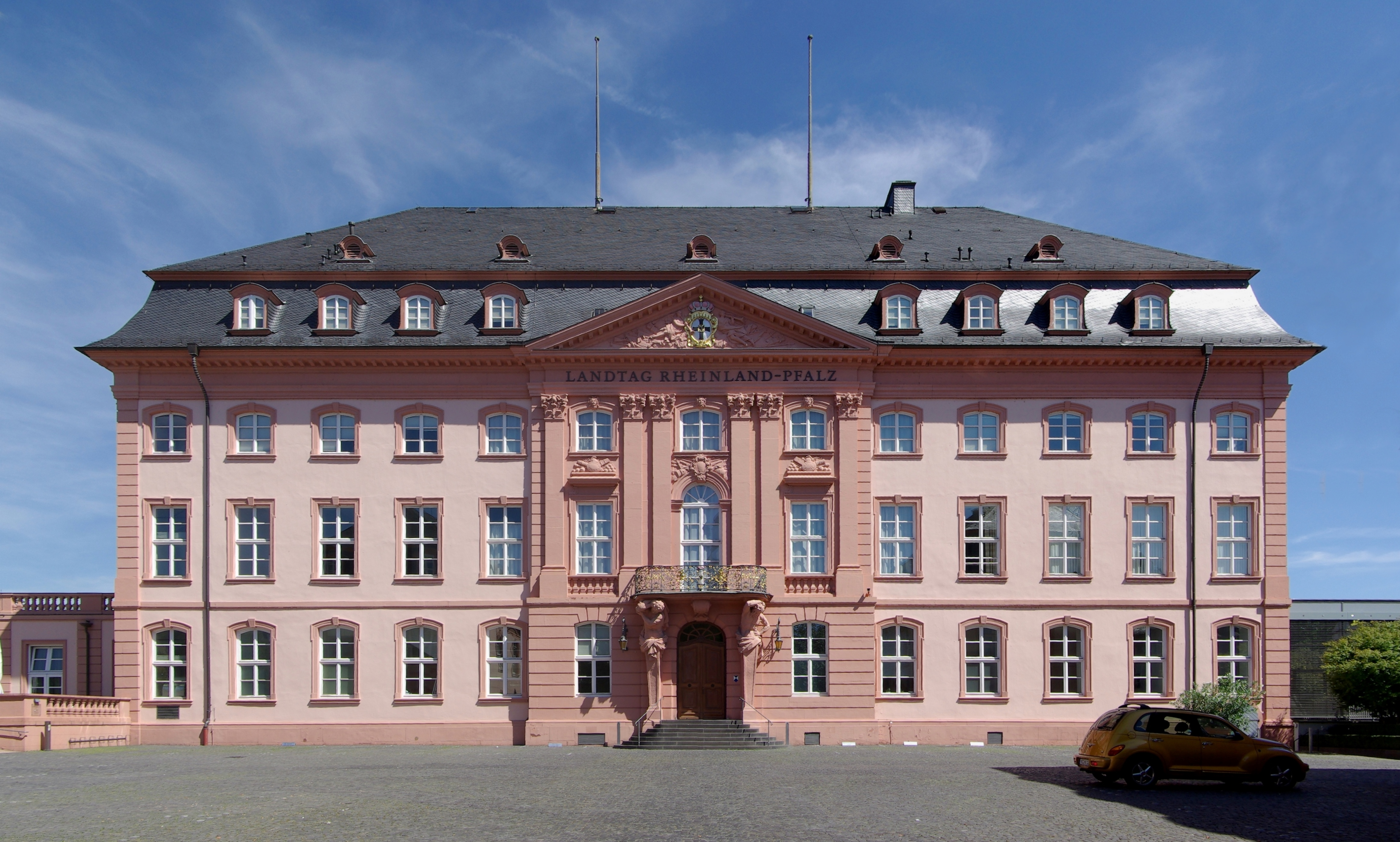
The Landtag of Rhineland-Palatinate

The 2026 Rhineland-Palatinate state election was held on 22 March 2026 to elect the 19th Landtag of Rhineland-Palatinate. The Christian Democratic Union of Germany (CDU) won with 31.0% of votes, while the Social Democratic Party of Germany, which led the state government since 1991, suffered significant losses and fell to second place with 25.9% of votes.

The Alternative for Germany (AfD) climbed to third place by doubling its vote share to 19.5%, the highest in western German states. The Alliance 90/The Greens came in fourth with 7.9%. The Free Democratic Party (FDP) and Free Voters (FW) both lost votes, failed to reach the five per cent hurdle and lost their parliamentary representation, which The Left (Die Linke) did not win either despite improvements. Turnout was 68.5%.

== Election date ==
The Rhineland-Palatinate state government set the date for the 19th state election on 22 March 2026. Interior Minister Michael Ebling stated that the date (a Sunday) met constitutional requirements, avoided the Easter holidays, and allowed for timely formation of the new state parliament. The election must occur between 57 and 60 months after the legislative period began on 18 May 2021. Unlike previous elections since 1996, the 2026 election did not coincide with Baden-Württemberg's due to differing legal and holiday schedules. Baden-Württemberg voted on 8 March 2026, while Rhineland-Palatinate's election date accommodated the mandatory 67-day period for approving election proposals, avoiding overlap with the year-end holiday season.

== Electoral system ==
In Rhineland-Palatinate, each voter has two votes. The first vote, known as the constituency vote, is used to elect a direct candidate. The second vote, called the state vote, is cast for a party or voter association and is decisive for the allocation of seats in the state parliament. The number of constituencies was increased from 51 to 52 in 2019. Parties and voter associations can choose to submit either a statewide list eligible for election across Rhineland-Palatinate or district lists in the four electoral districts; however, it is not mandatory to submit a district list for each district, and in such cases the state vote is not applicable statewide. For the 2021 state election, no district lists were approved.

Election proposals had to be submitted by 6 January 2026. For seat allocation, only parties and voter associations that receive at least 5% of the state votes are considered. Unlike federal elections, there is no basic mandate clause. The state parliament generally has 101 seats, with 52 allocated as direct mandates. Direct mandates won by parties or voter associations that fail to meet the 5% threshold are subtracted from the total before further seat allocation. If a party wins more direct mandates than its proportional share based on the state vote, other parties receive compensatory mandates, potentially increasing the total number of seats. The seat distribution for state and district lists uses the Sainte-Laguë/Schepers divisor method with standard rounding.

== Background ==
In the 2021 state elections, the SPD, led by Minister-President Malu Dreyer, achieved the largest share of the vote with 35.7 percent. The CDU came second with 27.7 percent, the Greens regained third place with 9.3 percent, and the AfD dropped from 3rd to 4th largest party in the Rhineland-Palatinate state parliament, getting 8.3 percent of the vote. The FDP came fifth with 5.5 percent. A sixth party, the Free Voters, made it into the state parliament for the first time with 5.4 percent. Prior to the election, all three parties in the traffic light coalition expressed they would like to continue their coalition in the new term. The balance of power within the alliance changed, since the Greens were now the second strongest party instead of the FDP. The SPD invited the Greens and FDP to exploratory talks the day after the election. Almost eight weeks after the election, the SPD, Greens, and FDP agreed to continue their previous coalition, forming the Third Dreyer cabinet.

In the constituent session of the state parliament on 18 May 2021, Malu Dreyer was re-elected Prime Minister and the Third Dreyer cabinet was sworn in. Due to health reasons, Dreyer resigned in summer 2024. On 10 July 2024, Alexander Schweitzer took over the position and formed the SPD-led Schweitzer cabinet with two ministers each from FDP and Greens.

On the federal level, in late 2024, the Scholz cabinet collapsed as the FDP withdrew from the traffic light coalition, triggering the snap February 2025 German federal election in which FDP lost its representation in the Bundestag, and the SPD dropped to third place, behind CDU and AfD. Both of the SPD and CDU refused to work with AfD in continuation of their Firewall policy. The only other option was a CDU-SPD coalition, which the parties agreed to, forming the Merz cabinet.

== Political parties ==
The table below lists the parties represented in the 18th Landtag.

No.	Name		Ideology	Leading candidate	2021 result	
No.	Name		Ideology	Leading candidate	Votes (%)	Seats
1	SPD	Social Democratic Party of Germany; Sozialdemokratische Partei Deutschlands	Social democracy	Alexander Schweitzer	35.7%	39 / 101
2	CDU	Christian Democratic Union of Germany; Christlich Demokratische Union Deutschlands	Christian democracy	Gordon Schnieder	27.7%	31 / 101
3	Grüne	Alliance 90/The Greens; Bündnis 90/Die Grünen	Green politics	Katrin Eder	9.3%	9 / 101
4	AfD	Alternative for Germany; Alternative für Deutschland	Right-wing populism	Jan Bollinger	8.3%	6 / 101
5	FDP	Free Democratic Party; Freie Demokratische Partei	Classical liberalism	Daniela Schmitt	5.5%	6 / 101
6	FW	Free Voters; Freie Wähler	Regionalism	Joachim Streit	5.4%	4 / 101

== Opinion polls ==
=== Graphical summary ===
Local regression of polls conducted, plus election result.

=== Party polling ===
Polling firm	Fieldwork date	Sample size	SPD	CDU	Grüne	AfD	FDP	FW	Linke	BSW	Others	Lead
2026 state election	22 March 2026	–	25.9	31.0	7.9	19.5	2.1	4.2	4.4	1.9	3.3	5.1
INSA	10–17 Mar 2026	1,000	27	28	9	20	–	5	5	–	6	1
Forschungsgruppe Wahlen	10–12 Mar 2026	1,121	26	28	9	19	–	5	5	–	8	2
Infratest dimap	9–11 Mar 2026	1,534	28	29	8	19	–	4.5	5	–	6.5	1
Infratest dimap	19–24 Feb 2026	1,158	27	28	9	19	–	5	5	–	7	1
Infratest dimap	14–20 Jan 2026	1,151	26	29	10	18	–	4	6	–	7	3
Infratest dimap	1–7 Oct 2025	1,158	23	29	10	19	–	4	6	–	9	6
INSA	16–23 Sep 2025	1,000	22	27	9	23	4	3	6	4	2	4
Wahlkreisprognose	6–19 Jun 2025	1,400	24.5	28	10.5	18	2	4	5.5	3	4.5	3.5
Infratest dimap	27 May–3 Jun 2025	1,140	23	30	11	17	3	4	5	–	7	7
INSA	25 Mar–1 Apr 2025	1,000	21	28	9	19	2	3	9	5	4	9
Federal Parliament election	23 February 2025	–	18.6	30.6	10.4	20.1	4.6	2.1	6.5	4.2	2.9	10.5
Infratest dimap	5–10 Dec 2024	1,175	24	32	11	14	4	4	–	4	7	8
Infratest dimap	4–9 Jul 2024	1,165	21	31	10	12	5	7	–	5	9	10
European Parliament election	9 June 2024	–	17.5	30.7	9.3	14.7	5.9	5.2	1.7	4.7	15.5	13.2
Infratest dimap	15–20 Feb 2024	1,157	22	31	10	15	4	7	–	4	7	9
Wahlkreisprognose	2–11 Dec 2023	1,237	26	27	8.5	20	3.5	7.5	1.5	–	6	1
Infratest dimap	25–30 Oct 2023	1,048	22	31	12	17	5	5	–	–	8	9
Infratest dimap	13–18 Jul 2023	1,156	25	31	11	16	5	6	–	–	6	6
INSA	8–15 May 2023	1,000	28	27	11	14	6	5	2	–	7	1
Infratest dimap	27–28 Mar 2023	1,180	28	29	14	12	5	4	–	–	7	1
Wahlkreisprognose	14–21 Mar 2023	1,000	29	25	11	16	5	6.5	2	–	5.5	4
Infratest dimap	9–13 Dec 2022	1,166	28	29	15	11	5	4	–	–	7	1
INSA	7–14 Nov 2022	1,000	28	28	13	13	5	5	2	–	6	Tie
Wahlkreisprognose	14–17 Oct 2022	1,023	26	25.5	10	15	7	6.5	2	–	8	0.5
Infratest dimap	26–27 Sep 2022	1,183	27	27	14	12	8	4	–	–	8	Tie
Wahlkreisprognose	2–10 Jul 2022	1,209	34.5	26.5	14	6.5	5	6.5	2	–	5	8
Wahlkreisprognose	11–18 May 2022	1,042	37	23.5	13	5	8	6	2	–	5.5	13.5
Wahlkreisprognose	21–28 Mar 2022	1,002	39	24	7	6	8	7	2	–	7	15
Infratest dimap	4–8 Mar 2022	1,158	34	26	11	7	9	5	–	–	8	8
Infratest dimap	19–23 Nov 2021	1,172	34	21	12	8	11	6	–	–	8	13
Wahlkreisprognose	1–9 Nov 2021	1,100	41	20	9.5	8	7.5	8	1.5	–	4.5	21
2021 federal election	26 September 2021	–	29.4	24.7	12.6	9.2	11.7	3.6	3.3	–	5.6	4.7
Infratest dimap	2–7 Sep 2021	1,160	40	23	9	8	6	5	3	–	6	17
Infratest dimap	9–13 Jul 2021	1,153	38	24	9	8	6	6	3	–	6	3
2021 state election	14 March 2021	–	35.7	27.7	9.3	8.3	5.5	5.4	2.5	–	5.7	8.0

== Results ==
Party	Party list			Constituency			Total seats	+/–
Party	Votes	%	Seats	Votes	%	Seats	Total seats	+/–
Christian Democratic Union	627,954	30.96	0	675,037	33.38	39	39	+8
Social Democratic Party	525,807	25.92	19	548,727	27.13	13	32	-7
Alternative for Germany	394,756	19.46	24	383,251	18.95	0	24	+15
Alliance 90/The Greens	160,073	7.89	10	160,126	7.92	0	10	0
The Left	88,983	4.39	0	76,967	3.81	0	0	0
Free Voters	84,972	4.19	0	83,051	4.11	0	0	-6
Free Democratic Party	42,063	2.07	0	50,088	2.48	0	0	-6
Sahra Wagenknecht Alliance	37,804	1.86	0	15,263	0.75	0	0	0
Tierschutzpartei	32,733	1.61	0	6,389	0.32	0	0	0
Volt	22,099	1.09	0	13,675	0.68	0	0	0
Ecological Democratic Party	9,173	0.45	0	8,277	0.41	0	0	0
Party of Humanists	1,813	0.09	0				0	0
Team Todenhöfer				531	0.03	0	0	0
Die PARTEI				516	0.03	0	0	0
Independents				624	0.03	0	0	0
Total	2,028,230	100.00	53	2,022,522	100.00	52	105	+4
Valid votes	2,028,230	99.11		2,022,522	98.83			
Invalid/blank votes	18,312	0.89		24,020	1.17			
Total votes	2,046,542	100.00		2,046,542	100.00			
Registered voters/turnout	2,990,064	68.44		2,990,064	68.44			
Source: Landeswahlleiter Rheinland-Pfalz

=== Electorate ===
Demographic	SPD	CDU	Grüne	AfD	FDP	FW	Linke	Other
Total vote	26%	31%	8%	19%	2%	4%	4%	6%
Sex
Men	25%	31%	7%	23%	2%	4%	4%	4%
Women	27%	30%	9%	16%	2%	4%	5%	7%
Age
18–24 years old	19%	15%	10%	21%	4%	5%	16%	10%
25–34 years old	19%	16%	12%	20%	3%	6%	13%	11%
35–44 years old	20%	24%	10%	26%	2%	5%	5%	8%
45–59 years old	23%	31%	8%	23%	2%	5%	2%	6%
60–69 years old	31%	33%	7%	19%	2%	4%	2%	2%
70 or older	34%	45%	4%	11%	2%	2%	1%	1%
Employment status
Self-employed	14%	40%	11%	18%	4%	4%	2%	7%
Employees	22%	26%	10%	21%	2%	6%	6%	7%
Workers	21%	16%	3%	39%	1%	7%	7%	6%
Pensioners	35%	39%	5%	14%	2%	2%	1%	1%
Education
Simple education	30%	31%	2%	26%	1%	4%	1%	5%
Medium education	23%	31%	4%	26%	2%	5%	3%	6%
High education	26%	31%	13%	12%	2%	4%	7%	5%
Financial situation
Good	27%	34%	8%	16%	2%	4%	4%	5%
Bad	18%	17%	6%	40%	1%	5%	6%	7%

== Possible coalitions ==
According to polling, the FDP was expected to lose its representation in the state parliament; this was confirmed by exit polls. A left-wing coalition (red-red-green) was also predicted to be impossible as the three left-wing parties (SPD, Greens, and The Left) that were in contention to win seats were not predicted to reach a majority between them. The AfD was predicted to finish in third place, with the best ever result in western states; however, it would remain in opposition as no other party is willing to cooperate with them according to the "firewall policy".

The mostly likely outcome was a grand coalition between the CDU and the SPD, as in the federal Bundestag, with the CDU taking over the lead according to exit polls. As seen in the Baden-Württemberg state election held two weeks earlier, the close proximity of the two leading parties in the polls, with uncertainty about which party the next minister-president would be selected from, produced tactical voting negatively affecting small parties, denying representation to FW and The Left according to exit polls. The Greens also saw a slight loss in vote share but kept representation.

== See also ==
- 2026 Baden-Württemberg state election
