= Ute Eiling-Hütig =

German politician (born 1967)

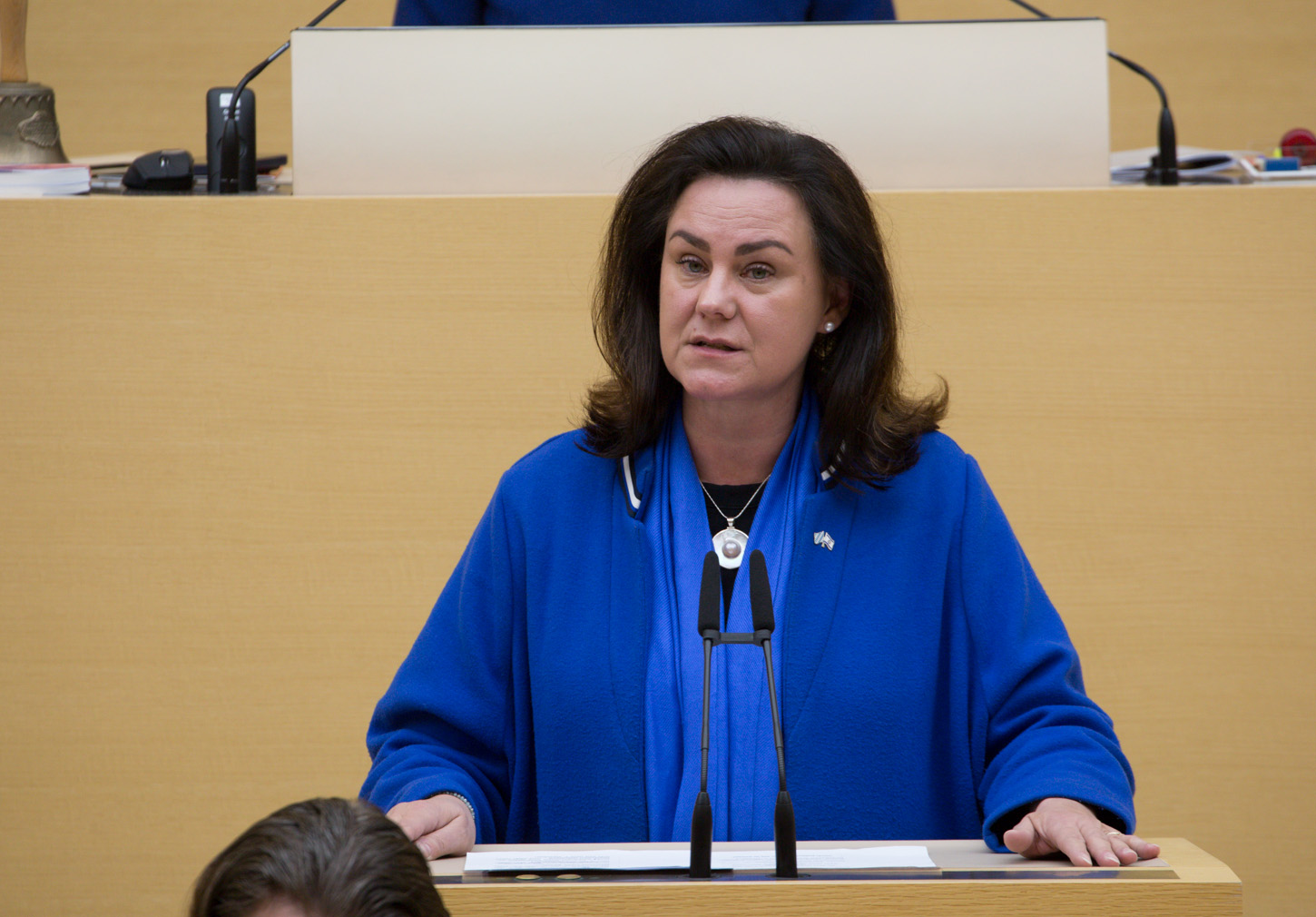
- Eiling-Hütig in 2023

Minister of Education of Rhineland-Palatinate
- Incumbent
- Assumed office 18 May 2026
- Minister-President: Gordon Schnieder
- Preceded by: Sven Teuber

Personal details
- Born: 7 November 1967 (age 58)
- Party: Christian Democratic Union (since 2026); Christian Social Union

Ute Eiling-Hütig (born 7 November 1967) is a German politician serving as minister of education of Rhineland-Palatinate since 2026. From 2013 to 2026, she was a member of the Landtag of Bavaria.
