= Markus Wolf (politician) =

German politician (born 1980)

Member of the Landtag of Rhineland-Palatinate
- In office 18 May 2021 – 18 May 2026
- Preceded by: Manfred Geis
- Succeeded by: Elke Schanzenbächer
- Constituency: Bad Dürkheim

Personal details
- Born: 4 August 1980 (age 45)
- Party: Christian Democratic Union (since 1996)

Markus Wolf (born 4 August 1980) is a German politician serving as state secretary of the interior of Rhineland-Palatinate since 2026. From 2021 to 2026, he was a member of the Landtag of Rhineland-Palatinate.
