= Jenny Groß =

German politician (born 1986)

Member of the Landtag of Rhineland-Palatinate
- Incumbent
- Assumed office 1 November 2019
- Preceded by: Gabriele Wieland
- Constituency: Montabaur

Personal details
- Born: 25 January 1986 (age 40) Bendorf
- Party: Christian Democratic Union (since 2005)

Jennifer Groß (born 25 January 1986 in Bendorf) is a German politician serving as a member of the Landtag of Rhineland-Palatinate since 2019. She has served as chairwoman of the Christian Democratic Union in the Westerwaldkreis since 2022.
