= Marcus Klein =

German politician (born 1976)

Member of the Landtag of Rhineland-Palatinate
- Incumbent
- Assumed office 8 October 2019
- Preceded by: Ralf Seekatz
- Constituency: Kaiserslautern-Land (2021–present)
- In office 18 May 2011 – 18 May 2016

Personal details
- Born: 12 November 1976 (age 49) Kaiserslautern
- Party: Christian Democratic Union (since 1993)

Marcus Klein (born 12 November 1976 in Kaiserslautern) is a German politician. He has been a member of the Landtag of Rhineland-Palatinate since 2019, having previously served from 2011 to 2016. He has served as chief whip of the Christian Democratic Union since 2024.
