= Thomas Röwekamp =

German politician

Thomas Röwekamp MdB
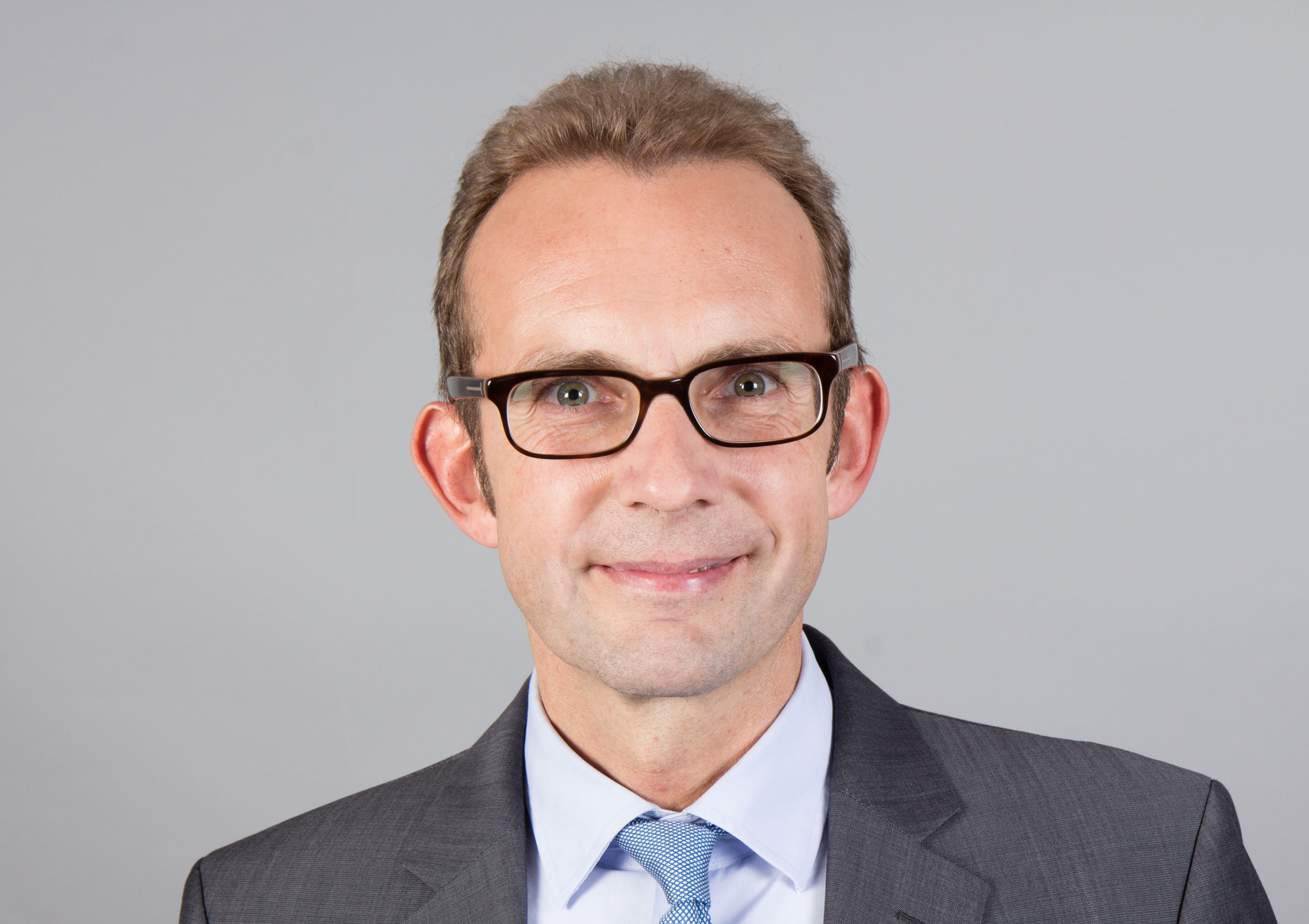
- Röwekamp in 2014

Vice President of the Senate and Mayor of the Free Hanseatic City of Bremen
- In office 25 May 2005 – 29 June 2007
- Mayor: Henning Scherf; Jens Böhrnsen
- Preceded by: Peter Gloystein
- Succeeded by: Karoline Linnert

Senator for the Interior of Bremen
- In office 4 July 2003 – 29 June 2007
- Mayor: Henning Scherf; Jens Böhrnsen
- Deputy: Ulrich Mäurer; Thomas vom Bruch
- Preceded by: Kuno Böse
- Succeeded by: Willi Lemke
Parliamentary constituencies
Member of the Bundestag for Bremen
Incumbent
Assumed office 26 October 2021
Preceded by	Elisabeth Motschmann
Member of the Bürgerschaft of Bremen for Bremerhaven
In office 28 June 2007 – 15 October 2021
Preceded by	multi-member district
Succeeded by	Melanie Morawietz
Constituency	Christian Democratic Union List
In office 6 November 1991 – 4 July 2003
Preceded by	multi-member district
Succeeded by	Wolfgang Pfahl
Constituency	Christian Democratic Union List

Personal details
- Born: Thomas Röwekamp; 18 September 1966 (age 60) Bremerhaven, Free Hanseatic City of Bremen, West Germany
- Party: Christian Democratic Union (1983–)
- Children: 3
- Education: University of Bremen
- Occupation: Politician; Lawyer; Bank Teller
- Website: Official Website

Thomas Röwekamp (born 18 September 1966 in Bremerhaven) is a German lawyer and politician of the Christian Democratic Union (CDU) who has been serving as a member of the Bundestag since 2021.

From 1991 to 2021, Röwekamp was a member of the State Parliament of Bremen. From 2007 he was his parliamentary group's chairman. In the government of Henning Scherf, Röwekamp was Senator and under the government of Jens Böhrnsen vice-mayor of Bremen.

== Political career ==
=== Career in state politics ===
Röwekamp served as Bremen's State Minister of the interior in the governments of successive Mayors Henning Scherf and Jens Böhrnsen from 2003 to November 2005. During his time in office, he initiated cost-saving structural changes within the Bremen Police.

In early January 2005 the 35-year-old Laye-Alama Condé from Sierra Leone vomited four cocaine globules at the police station in Bremen and drowned the forced influx of water. Röwekamp took the political responsibility for the award of emetics to suspected drug dealers. He justified the so-called Brechmitteleinsatz with the words, "heavy criminal" would have to "expect physical disadvantages."

Röwekamp co-chaired the CDU's national conventions in Dresden (2006) and Karlsruhe (2010).

In the 2007 state elections, Röwekamp unsuccessfully challenged incumbent Jens Böhrnsen as mayor.

Röwekamp was a CDU delegate to the Federal Convention for the purpose of electing the President of Germany in 2009.

=== Member of the German Parliament, 2021–present ===
In parliament, Röwekamp has been serving on the Defence Committee, which he has been chairing since 2025.

== Personal life ==
Röwekamp and his family live in Bremen.
