= Ulrich Mäurer =

German politician

Senator Ulrich Mäurer
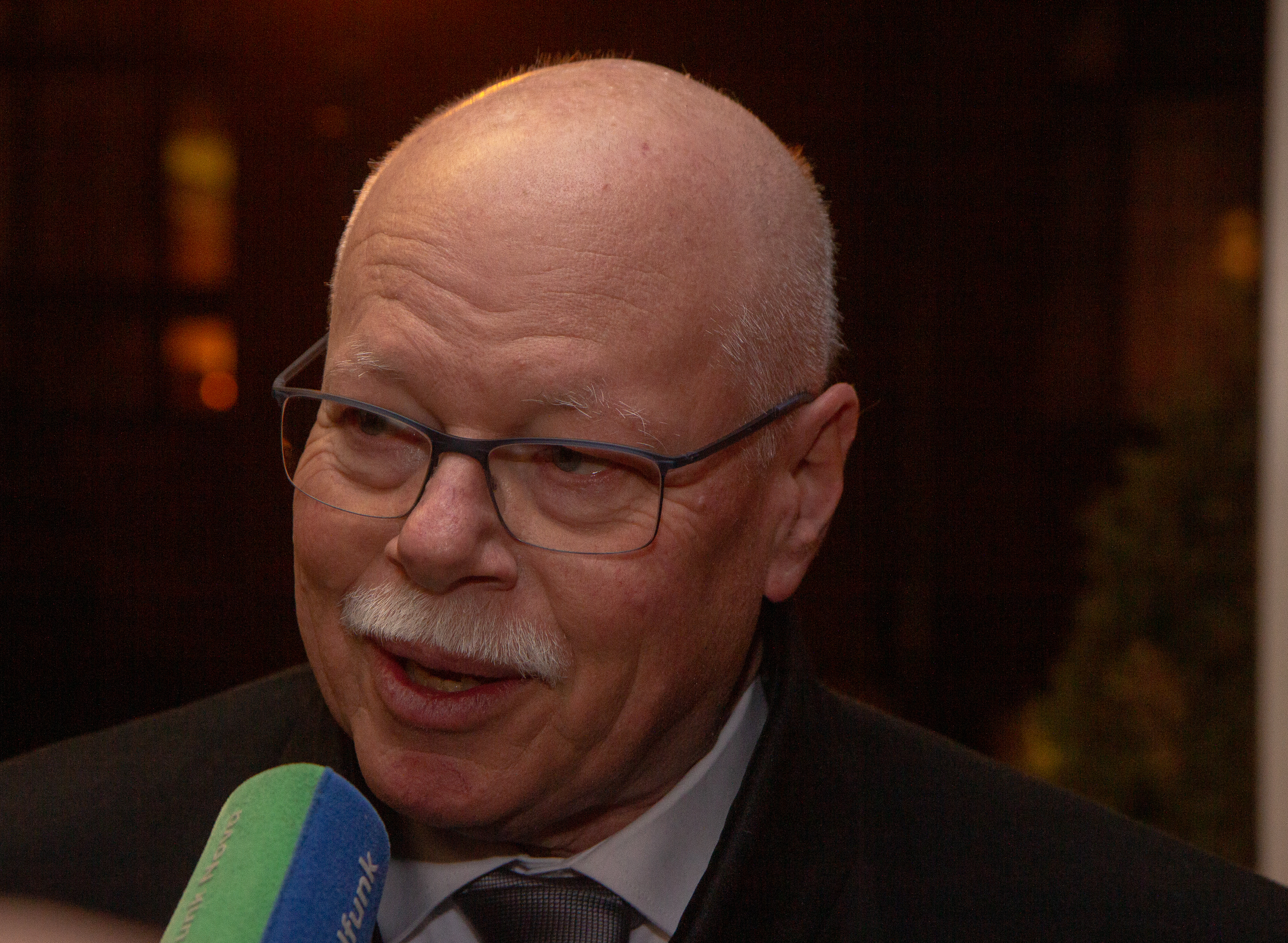
- Mäurer in 2018

Senator for the Interior of Bremen
- In office 7 May 2008 – 11 December 2025
- Mayor: Jens Böhrnsen; Carsten Sieling; Andreas Bovenschulte
- Deputy: Karen Buse; Holger Münch; Thomas Ehmke; Olaf Bull
- Preceded by: Willi Lemke
- Succeeded by: Eva Högl

Counselor of State for the Interior of Bremen
- In office May 1997 – 7 May 2008 Serving with Wolfgang E. Goehler, Kuno Böse, Thomas vom Bruch
- Mayor: Henning Scherf; Jens Böhrnsen
- Senator: See list: Ralf Borttscheller; Bernt Schulte; Hartmut Perschau (acting); Kuno Böse; Thomas Röwekamp; Willi Lemke
- Preceded by: Hans-Georg von Bock und Polach
- Succeeded by: Karen Buse

Personal details
- Born: 14 July 1951 (age 75) Höhr-Grenzhausen, Rhineland-Palatinate, West Germany (now Germany)
- Party: Social Democratic Party (1970–)
- Education: University of Marburg; University of Bremen
- Occupation: Politician; Civil Servant; Jurist

Ulrich Mäurer is a German lawyer and politician (SPD). He was Minister for the interior in the Free Hanseatic City of Bremen from 2008 until his resignation in 2025.

== Life ==
Mäurer studied law at the University in Marburg and Bremen and reached his degree in 1978. He became Assessor in Bremen Administration and worked later in several positions at the law, corrections and interior departments of the state of Bremen. In November 1987 he became head of the law-education center of Bremen.

== Politic ==
In 1970 Mäurer became a member of German Social Democratic Party (SPD). In 1997 he became state secretary at Senator for law and the constitution. In 2008 he followed Willi Lemke as Minister for Interior and Sport (Senat Böhrnsen II). The office of Ministers in the Free Hanseatic Citys is called Senator.

In 2013 as Senator for the Interior he prohibited the most violent Motorcycle Gangs in Bremen, Hells Angels MC and Mongols MC. Both gangs were deeply involved in organized crime. The Miri-Clan, a large family of Lebanese origin with an estimated 2,600 members, were dominating the Mongols MC, while the Hells Angels had connections to far-right hooligans.

In 2014 he would be known for his initiative to charge German Football Association (DFB) for the regular massive police present at football matches, which was paid until than by public money from taxes. Deutsche Fußball-Liga (DFL) denied this and it went to court.

In 2025 he announced his resignation as Senator for the Interior of Bremen, naming his age as the main reason. He was the longest serving Interior Senator of Bremen, serving in this function for over 17 years. Eva Högl was elected as his successor by the Bürgerschaft of Bremen in December 2025.
