= 1999 Bremen state election =

State election in Bremen, Germany

← 1995	6 June 1999	2003 →

All 100 seats in the Bürgerschaft of Bremen 51 seats needed for a majority
- Turnout: 291,091 (60.1%) ▼8.5%
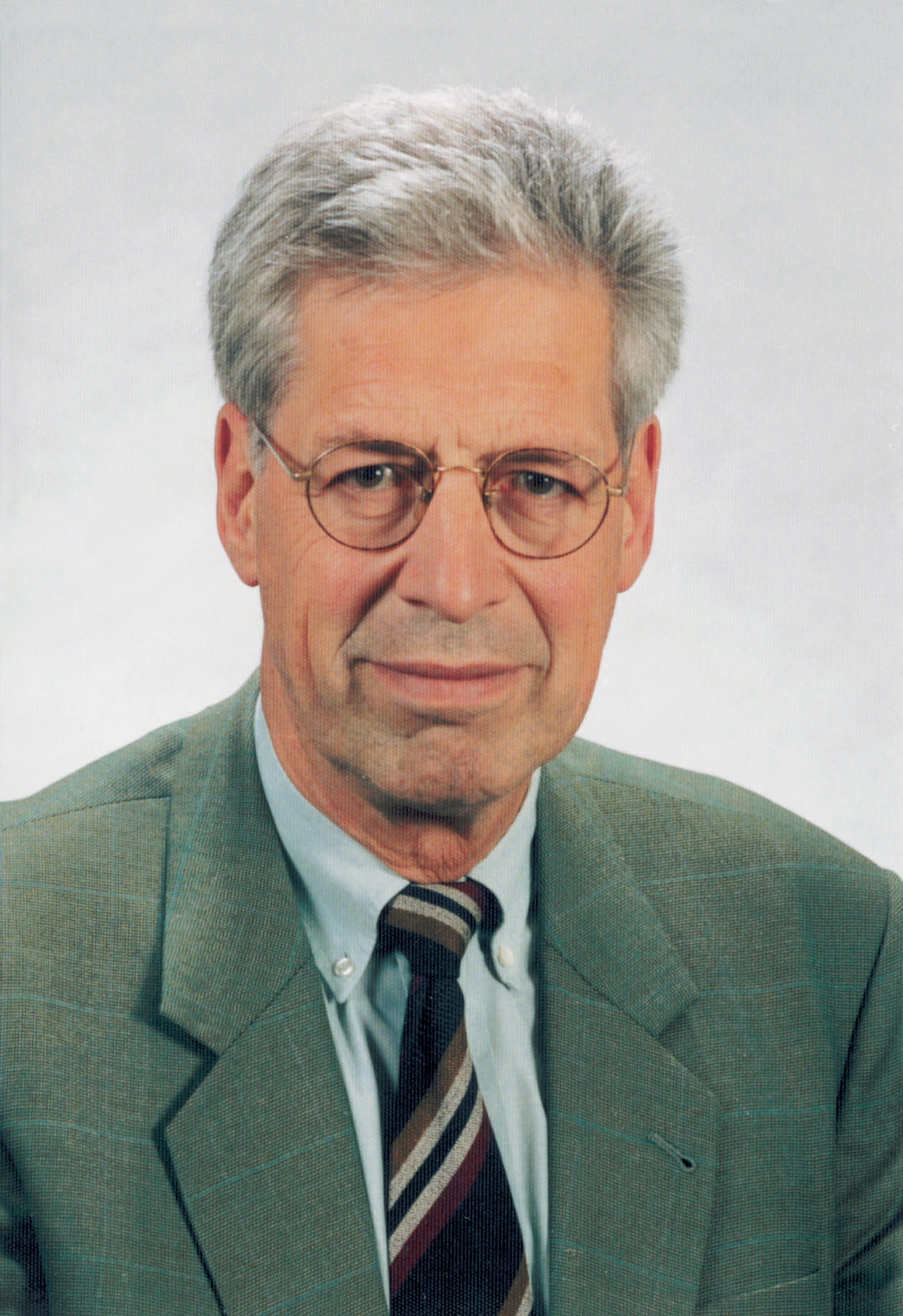
	First party	Second party
Leader	Henning Scherf
Party	SPD	CDU
Last election	37 seats, 33.4%	37 seats, 32.6%
Seats won	47	42
Seat change	▲10	▲5
Popular vote	123,875	108,050
Percentage	42.6%	37.1%
Swing	▲9.2%	▲4.5%
	Third party	Fourth party
Party	Greens	DVU
Last election	14 seats, 13.1%	0 seats, 2.5%
Seats won	10	1
Seat change	▼4	▲1
Popular vote	25,958	8,823
Percentage	8.9%	3.0%
Swing	▼4.2%	▲0.5%
Mayor before election
Henning Scherf
SPD
Elected Mayor
Henning Scherf
SPD

The 1999 Bremen state election was held on 6 June 1999 to elect the members of the Bürgerschaft of Bremen, as well as the city councils of Bremen and Bremerhaven. The incumbent grand coalition of the Social Democratic Party (SPD) and Christian Democratic Union (CDU) led by Mayor Henning Scherf retained its majority and continued in office.

== Parties ==
The table below lists parties represented in the previous Bürgerschaft of Bremen.

Name		Ideology	Leader(s)	1995 result	
Name		Ideology	Leader(s)	Votes (%)	Seats
SPD	Social Democratic Party of Germany; Sozialdemokratische Partei Deutschlands	Social democracy	Henning Scherf	33.4%	37 / 100
CDU	Christian Democratic Union of Germany; Christlich Demokratische Union Deutschlands	Christian democracy		32.6%	37 / 100
Grüne	Alliance 90/The Greens; Bündnis 90/Die Grünen	Green politics		13.1%	14 / 100
AFB	Labour for Bremen and Bremerhaven; Arbeit für Bremen und Bremerhaven	Economic liberalism		10.7%	12 / 100

== Election result ==
Summary of the 6 June 1999 election results for the Bürgerschaft of Bremen
Party	Votes	%	+/–	Seats	+/–
Social Democratic Party (SPD)	123,875	42.56	+9.2	47	+10
Christian Democratic Union (CDU)	108,050	37.12	+4.5	42	+5
Alliance 90/The Greens (Grüne)	25,958	8.92	-4.2	10	-4
German People's Union (DVU)	8,823	3.03	+0.5	1	+1
Party of Democratic Socialism (PDS)	8,418	2.89	+0.5	0	±0
Free Democratic Party (FDP)	7,327	2.52	-0.9	0	±0
Labour for Bremen and Bremerhaven (AFB)	7,110	2.44	-8.3	0	-12
Others	1,530	0.53		0	±0
Total	291,091	100.00	–	100	–

Popular Vote
SPD	42.56%
CDU	37.12%
B'90/GRÜNE	8.92%
DVU	3.03%
PDS	2.89%
FDP	2.52%
AFB	2.44%
Other	0.53%

Bürgerschaft seats
SPD	47.00%
CDU	42.00%
B'90/GRÜNE	10.00%
DVU	1.00%
