= 1987 Bremen state election =

Election in Bremen, Germany

← 1983	13 September 1987	1991 →

All 100 seats in the Bürgerschaft of Bremen 51 seats needed for a majority
- Registered: 519,068
- Turnout: 392,547 (75.6%) ▼4.1pp
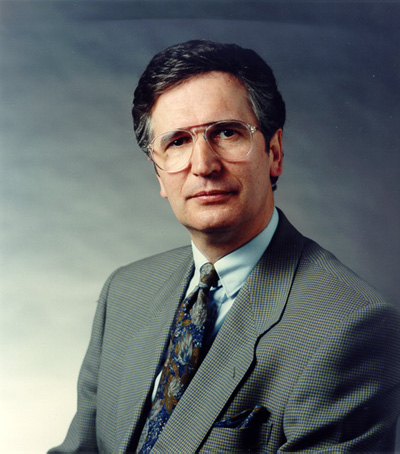

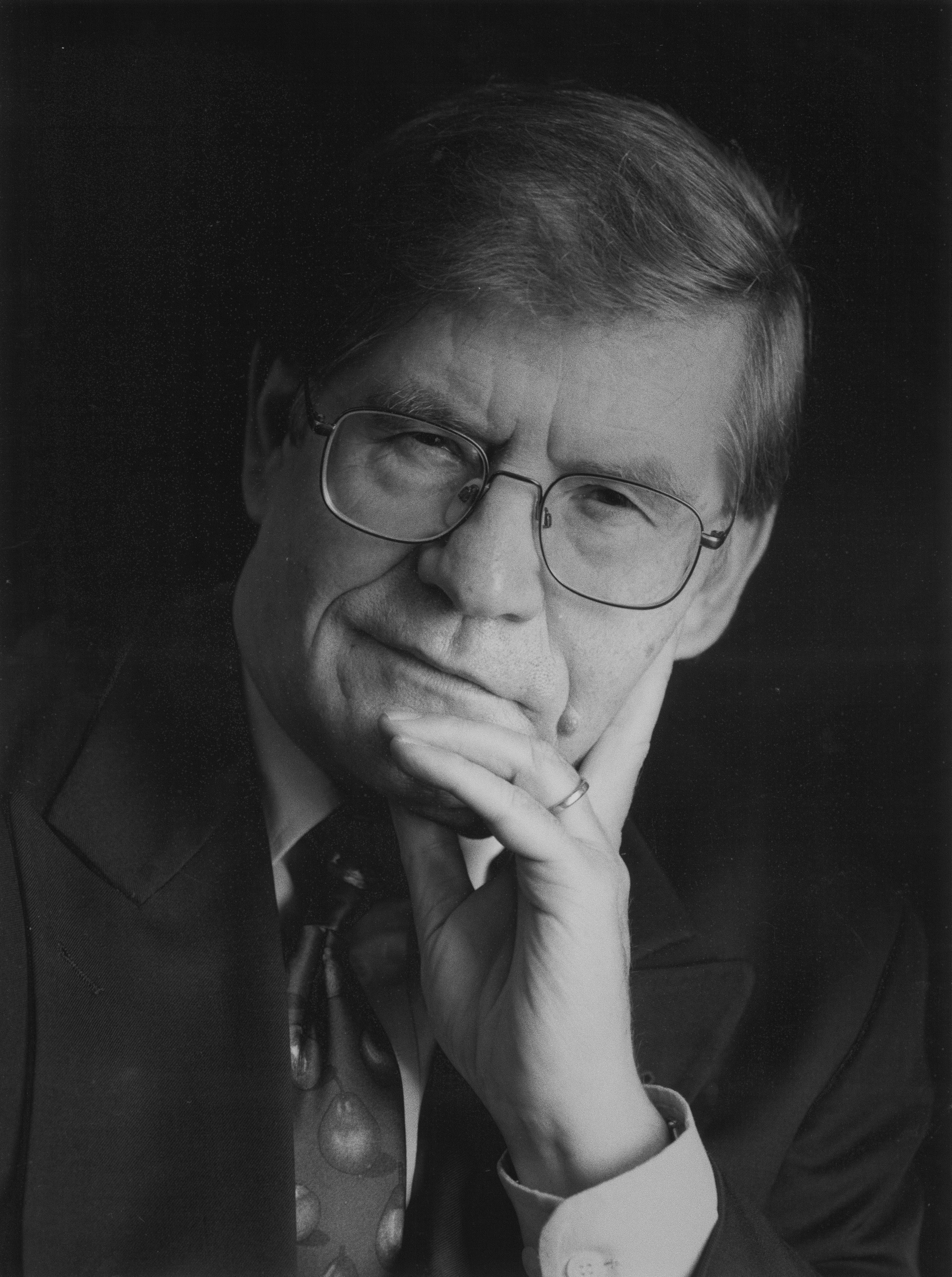
	First party	Second party	Third party
			Grüne
Candidate	Klaus Wedemeier	Reinhard Metz
Party	SPD	CDU	Greens
Last election	58 seats, 51.3%	37 seats, 33.3%	5 seats, 9.2%
Seats won	54	25	10
Seat change	▼4	▼12	▲5
Popular vote	196,903	91,334	39,839
Percentage	50.5%	23.4%	10.2%
Swing	▼0.8	▼9.9	▲1.0
	Fourth party	Fifth party
	FDP	DVU
Party	FDP	DVU
Last election	0 seats, 4.6%	–
Seats won	10	1
Seat change	▲10	New
Popular vote	18,828	13,299
Percentage	10.0%	3.4%
Swing	▲5.4	New
Mayor before election
Klaus Wedemeier
SPD
Elected Mayor
Klaus Wedemeier
SPD

The 1987 Bremen state election was held on 13 September 1987 to elect the members of the 12th Bürgerschaft of Bremen, as well as the city councils of Bremen and Bremerhaven. The incumbent Social Democratic Party (SPD) government, led by Mayor Klaus Wedemeier, lost four seats but retained its majority. Wedemeier had become mayor following the resignation of his predecessor, Hans Koschnick, in September 1985.

The Free Democratic Party (FDP) returned to the parliament with 10 seats after having no reprensentation following the results of the previous election. Additionally, the German People's Union (DVU) won their first seat in the history of the parliament.

== Parties ==
The table below lists parties represented in the previous Bürgerschaft of Bremen.

Name		Ideology	Lead candidate	1983 result	
Name		Ideology	Lead candidate	Votes (%)	Seats
SPD	Social Democratic Party of Germany; Sozialdemokratische Partei Deutschlands	Social democracy	Hans Koschnick	51.3%	58 / 100
CDU	Christian Democratic Union of Germany; Christlich Demokratische Union Deutschlands	Christian democracy	Bernd Neumann	33.3%	37 / 100
Grüne	The Greens; Die Grünen	Green politics		5.4%	5 / 100

== Results ==
Party	Votes	%	+/–	Seats	+/–
Social Democratic Party	196,903	50.51	–0.83	54	–4
Christian Democratic Union	91,334	23.43	–9.88	25	–12
The Greens	39,839	10.22	+4.79	10	+5
Free Democratic Party	39,078	10.03	+5.44	10	+10
German People's Union	13,299	3.41	New	1	New
The Republicans	4,623	1.19	New	0	New
German Communist Party	2,159	0.55	New	0	New
Pensioners' Party	2,109	0.54	–0.45	0	0
Free German Workers' Party	256	0.07	New	0	New
Marxist–Leninist Party of Germany	200	0.05	New	0	New
Total	389,800	100.00	–	100	0
Valid votes	389,800	99.30			
Invalid/blank votes	2,747	0.70			
Total votes	392,547	100.00			
Registered voters/turnout	519,068	75.63			
Source: Tagesschau, Bremen State Statistical Office

Popular Vote
SPD	50.5%
CDU	23.4%
GRÜNE	10.2%
FDP	10.0%
DVU	3.4%
Other	2.5%

Bürgerschaft seats
SPD	54.0%
CDU	25.0%
GRÜNE	10.0%
FDP	10.0%
DVU	1.0%
