= Ella Ehlers =

German politician (1904–1985)

- Ehlers in 1947
- Born: Ella Schimpf; 30 May 1904; Dresden, Kingdom of Saxony, German Empire
- Died: 9 April 1985 (aged 80); Bremen, West Germany
- Occupations: Educator; Activist; Politician
- Political party: KPD (1920–1929); KPD(O) (1929–1932); SAPD (1932–1946); SPD (after 1946)
- Spouse: Adolf Ehlers

Ella Ehlers (born Ella Schimpf: 30 May 1904 – 9 April 1985) was a German Kindergarten teacher. Through her work, in 1926 she met Adolf Ehlers (1898–1978), a political activist who at around the same time was readmitted to the Communist Party. She became his secretary and then, in 1928, his wife. Ella Schimpf had grown up in a heavily politicised family, and she now participated energetically with her husband in the increasingly polarised politics of the time. After 1933 she engaged in dangerous (and illegal) anti-government resistance, but she nevertheless survived the twelve Hitler years.

In 1945 she rejoined the (no longer illegal) Communist Party, but switched the next year to the SPD and built a new political career in Bremen, at times working closely with her husband who became a senator and later, between 1959 and 1963, mayor of the city. Her own focus was mostly on the social and welfare sectors. She was involved in the setting up of several new support organisations. Ella Ehlers' final major role came in 1964 when she was appointed to chair the state committee of the Workers' Welfare organisation.

== Life ==
=== Provenance and early years ===
Ella Schimpf was born in Dresden, the youngest of her parents' three children. Karl Schimpf, father worked as a glazier and cabinet maker. Her mother Maria had worked in one of Dresden's many cigarette factories, but after the births of the children switched to making hand-rolled cigarettes as a "home worker". Both her parents were active trades unionists and, by 1900, members of the still far from mainstream Social Democratic Party ("Sozialdemokratische Partei Deutschlands" / SPD). Politics and socialism were frequently discussed within the family, often with great passion. At the age of eight Ella would join her brother to deliver the pro-SPD Leipziger Volkszeitung (Newspaper), in order to be able to contribute to the family housekeeping budget.

=== War ===
In 1914, when she was ten both her parents resigned from the SPD, horrified by the decision of the party leadership in the Reichstag (national parliament) to vote in favour of war credits to help finance the war which had broken out in July. That decision was contentious with many party members; and by the time the war ended four years later had led to a party split and thereby, indirectly, the launch of the Communist Party of Germany During December/January 1918/1919. Her parents joined the Communist Party in 1920. Ella and her siblings joined the Young Communists.

=== Work and qualification ===
1918 was the year in which she left school and went to work in the children's ward at a nearby hospital and, later, at as a domestic assistant at a sanatorium. When she had been younger she had planned to become a teacher, and now she was keen to train and qualify for a career in nursing, but both options were closed off to her by the absence of the necessary funds in the family. Nevertheless, her extensive hands-on experience of childcare would later prove invaluable for her subsequent career in the care sector and, after 1928, in politics. In 1922 a "free place" came up for a traineeship as a Kindergarten teacher and registered children's nurse: she grabbed her opportunity.

=== Barkenhoff ===
The children came from miserable backgrounds, often made worse by a parent's imprisonment. Now [in the Barkenhoff] they were to be nurtured in order not merely to restore them physically, but also so that they might acquire experience of solidarity and be educated to become politically thinking individuals.

- "Of course the children in the home were bought up to be critical: What kind of a society was it, in which we were living? Why had their fathers been shot, fallen in war, or ended up in jail? Self-evidently we told the children that their imprisoned parents were sitting in prisons not as criminals, but because of an idea [that the post-war world could yet be made a better place]."
- "Natürlich wurden die Kinder im Heim kritisch erzogen: Was ist dies für eine Gesellschaft, in der ihr lebt, warum sind die Väter erschossen, gefallen oder im Gefängnis? Wir haben ihnen selbstverständlich gesagt, dass sie nicht als Verbrecher dort sitzen, sondern wegen einer Idee."

Ella Ehlers

Following qualification, Schimpf worked between 1924 and 1928 at the Barkenhoff in Worpswede, a small town set in the flat marshlands to the north of Bremen that had become home to a lively artistic community since the end of the 19th century. The Barkenhoff was a large detached house that had been acquired by the artist-turned-pacifist Heinrich Vogeler in 1894, and which after the First World War was made available by its owner to "Red Aid", a communist led workers' welfare organisation with well-publicised links to its Moscow based sister organisation ("Междунаро́дная организа́ция по́мощи борца́м револю́ции" / МОПР). Red Aid reconfigured the house for use as a rehabilitation home for the children of killed Communist activists and those who had been arrested and detained in the aftermath of the uprisings in the ports and industrial cities during 1918/19. Other sources emphasize the extent to which many of the children looked after in The Barkenhoff were "half-orphans" (the children of war-widow mothers) and children from families in which the fathers had been too badly wounded in the war to be able to find work and provide for their own children. According to at least one source the Barkenhoff children's home was organised on a "collective" basis. Elsewhere it is stated that Ella Schimpf/Ehlers was placed in overall charge of it in 1926 and ran it for the next two years.

=== A very political marriage ===
It was through the highly politicised children's home at which she worked that in 1926 Ella Schimpf met Adolf Ehlers (1898–1978). Ehlers was a prominent member of the Communist Party and the newly appointed secretary of "Red Aid". The two of them quickly formed an intense personal relationship which, as matters turned out, would become life-long. They married at some point between 1928 and 1935: sources differ. The marriage would remain childless. By the time the Ehlers relocated to Berlin in 1928 they were both committed members of the Communist Party which was itself in a state of intensifying inner turmoil.

=== Party ructions ===
In 1929 Ella Ehlers took over the direction of a MOPR ("International Red Aid") children's home in Elgersburg, in the countryside south of Erfurt in Thuringia, from where every two months she visited her husband who had remained in Berlin. Over the next couple of years she became caught up in the backwash from the ferocious party ructions of the period, both on account of her husband and on her own account. Ever since Ernst Thälmann had become party leader in 1925 there had been a drive from the top for the Communist Party of Germany to align itself more closely - and some thought ever more unquestioningly - with the uncompromising anti-Trotskyite "hardline" version of communism which by this time was being propounded and implemented by the Soviet party under Stalin. One result of this in Germany was an unbending hostility to the centre-left Social Democratic Party, which contributed to a division on the political left of German politics that would prove disastrous in the build-up to 1933. Adolf and Ella Ehlers had relocated to Berlin, and Adolf Ehlers had remained there, in order that he might undertake an important job as national head of the propaganda department for "Red Aid". Sources indicate that his appointment to the job took effect during or shortly after 1927. However, by 1929 he was becoming increasingly estranged from the Stalinist party leadership, and when the party split during 1929/30 he was one of a large number of senior comrades who ended up as members of the so-called Communist Party of Germany (Opposition), which in the short term sought (unsuccessfully) to replace the "mainstream" Communist Party. Ella Ehlers had no difficulty in backing her husband and the other members of the break-away party. Sources are not entirely clear about the chronology of the next couple of years, but during or before 1930 Adolf Ehlers lost his job as head of the propaganda with "Red Aid". Ella Ehlers was having her own problems at Elgersburg with the Comintern "permanent representative" to Germany, Elena Stasova and with Erna Halbe who had been parachuted in by the party leadership to join her as co-leader at the MOPR children's home. In or before 1931 Ella Ehlers was removed from her position at the children's home and expelled from the party.

=== Back to Bremen ===
The Ehlers now moved back to Bremen where in the immediate term they now lived with Ella's older sister Grete Deisen and her husband Wilhelm, who had their home in the Osternburger Street near the city centre. Wilhelm Deisen was a fellow Communist activist who, like the Ehlers, had broken away from the "mainstream" party. Neither of the Ehlers was able to find work, and they stayed with the Deisen's, accommodated in an improvised apartment in the attic, for longer than any of those involved might have anticipated. A particular difficulty was that Adolf Ehlers had fallen seriously ill. He remained unemployed for six and a half years. Ella Ehlers therefore trained and qualified for office work, after which she took a clerical job with a small Bremen coffee business. Subsequently or concurrently she also undertook typing and office work with the Bergolin paint factory. The proprietor was aware of her anti-government political views, but protected her. Throughout the middle 1930s, till 1938, Adolf and Ella Ehlers were entirely dependent on Ella's wages for putting food on the table.

=== Politics and resistance ===
During 1932 the couple joined the Socialist Workers' Party ("Sozialistische Arbeiterpartei Deutschlands" / SAPD), which had been formed the previous year by break-away former members of the SPD. With German politics increasingly spilling onto the streets as the political parties became ever more polarised, and with the Reichstag (national parliament) becoming gridlocked by the mutual contempt of the principal populist parties (and not helped by continuing refusal of the Communist Party to discuss any sort of parliamentary coalition or collaboration with anyone else), the SAPD was formed out of a fear that political division on the left was opening a path to power for populist nationalists of the right. It proved a prescient fear, and one with which the Ehlers identified. In Bremen most of the former communists who had switched to the (as matters turned out short-lived) KPD(O) as part of the party split of 1929/30 also switched over to the SAPD.

In January 1933 the Hitler government seized the opportunity presented by the political gridlock to take power. The new government lost no time in transforming Germany into a one-party dictatorship Political activity (unless on behalf of the ruling National Socialists) was outlawed. "Red Aid" was banned as part of the Reichstag Fire Decree at the end of February 1933. The Ehlers by now had their own apartment which very soon became a secret meeting place for the now illegal political activity which they continued to undertake with party comrades. Resistance activism under a dictatorship tends to go unreported unless those who engage in it end up in court, in which case records of statements used for the trial often provide a relatively detailed version of what was done or at least alleged. Ella Ehlers appears never to have been caught. Sources recall that during the twelve years of the Hitler government she undertook (and according to at least one source organised) illegal courier work which kept SAPD comrades in touch with one another. Elsewhere it is recorded that she was involved in helping endangered female comrades to escape the country. In 1934 the underground SAPD made contact with the "Internationaler Sozialistischer Kampfbund" (loosely, "International Socialist Militant League"), an organisation of German socialists who had set up an exiled leadership group in Sweden. There was a regular exchange of documents involving the SAPD leader August Enderle who was based in Stockholm from 1934 and who evidently had access to a printing press. A communication channel was set up involving members of the International Transport Workers' Federation, working on the ships sailing between the Swedish parts and Bremen. In addition it is recorded that on at least two occasions Ella Ehlers herself made the trip from Berlin to Hamburg in order to meet a woman in a café who gave her printed pamphlets for onward distribution in Germany. In connection with her courier work during the war years Ella Ehlers also established firm and lasting friendships both with Irmgard Enderle and with the future Berlin mayor and West German chancellor Willy Brandt, who after 1940 assumed an increasingly prominent role among the German socialist resistance activists based in Norway and Sweden.

It is impossible to know how far the security services were aware of the extent of the illegal contacts that Adolf and Elly Ehlers sustained on behalf of the SAPD. Certainly their house was subjected to frequent and thorough searches and they themselves were burdened with a succession of checks and reporting requirements. They nevertheless seem to have avoided lengthy periods of detention. Despite his political record, in 1938 Adolf Ehlers finally managed to find work. He had already worked for the shipbuilders AG Weser between 1918 and 1923, and in 1938 the firm took him back. He immediately became known to those who wished and needed to know as a contact between the workforce and the "underground" anti-government resistance movement in Bremen.

=== After the war ===
Already in 1944 Adolf Ehlers was meeting regularly with Hermann Wolters of the Communist Party. Military defeat had been on the horizon ever since Germany's catastrophic military reverses at Stalingrad in 1942/43, and the men's conspiratorial meetings presumably included discussions of possible post-war options. Those meetings may also have played their part in persuading Adolf and Ella Ehlers to rejoin the Communist Party after War ended and the National Socialist dictatorship ended in May 1945. With no way of immediately organising elections in the rubble of the German cities and towns, The western occupying powers were nevertheless keen to restore the pre-Hitler democratic intuitions with a power balance that should as far as possible (and with the exception of National Socialist representation) reflect the political power balance in 1932/33, which was the last time that broadly democratic elections had taken place in a democratic Germany. In Bremen Adolf Ehlers and Hermann Wolters were nominated to represent the Communist Party in the Senate of Bremen. Adolf Ehlers continued to serve in the senate till 1963.

Although most of north-western Germany was placed in the British occupation zone in 1945, Bremen was administered by the US occupation forces for logistical reasons connected with the need by the US military for a large port into which they could ship men and supplies to support their operations in the US occupation zone to the south. To the east lay the Soviet occupation zone. In the immediate post war period those with access to transport were able to move relatively freely between the four occupation zones, and in May 1946 Adolf Ehlers and Hermann Wolters together attended the Leipzig Trade Fair. During their visit they clashed bitterly with comrade Walter Ulbricht, who was emerging as the Soviet-backed leader of a new kind of German one-party dictatorship in the central region of Germany which between 1945 and 1949 was administered under Soviet military control. Political developments during April 1946 had recalled pre-war concerns across the west that the German communist party, like its new successor party in the Soviet zone, risked becoming nothing more than a proxy for Moscow's all-too traditional imperialist ambitions. Towards the end of May 1946 Adolf and Ella Ehlers switched their political allegiance to the Social Democratic Party. When local elections were held in October 1946 Adolf Ehlers won his seat as an SPD member of the "Bremen Bürgerschaft" (state parliament). Between 1945 and 1948 Adolf Ehlers served as Senator for Welfare. In 1947 Health was added to his senatorial portfolio. 1947 was also the year in which he was one of a small group of senators engaged in drafting a new state constitution for Bremen. He then served between 1948 and 1963 as Bremen Senator for the Interior, which made him one of the city's leading political figures during the "Wirtschaftswunder" years.

=== "Bremer Arbeiterhilfswerk" (AHW) ===
In addition to supporting her husband in his political role, Ella Ehlers undertook a number of major projects of her own. In August 1945 she co-founded and became deputy chair ("... zweite Vorsitzende") of the "Bremer Arbeiterhilfswerk" (AHW), a workers' welfare provider in which, at least in these early days, Communists and Social Democrats worked closely together. In the austerity of the immediate postwar years there were major programmes for distributing food, clothes, heating fuel and so-called "CARE-packages" to be planned and implemented. As part of the AHW operation she organised children's convalescence cures in the village of Lankenau, a short distance outside Bremen to the west. She organised sewing rooms for women who had no prospect of visiting shops to replace their families' worn out clothes and established another much needed programme which involved as necessary/possible sorting, cleaning, mending and redistributing donated second-hand clothes to those who needed them most urgently.

Because of the extensive use that the US military were making of the extensive dock facilities, and the millions of US citizens whose parents or grandparents had emigrated via the port during the concluding decades of the nineteenth century, Bremen was already relatively well known in the United States, where a network of volunteer-based welfare charities had sprung up in response to the human tragedies in Europe of the war and its aftermath. Her friendship from their illegal contacts with SAPD activists who had been based in Stockholm during the war years had left Ella Ehlers with good contacts in Sweden. Swiss welfare organisations were also much in evidence in Germany during the immediate post-war years. Through these contacts Ella Ehlers took the initiative on behalf of the AHW of launching an international aid and welfare donations campaign in support of the many needy citizens of Bremen. From Sweden Irmgard Enderle sent additional "CARE-parcels". Other politically engaged Bremen citizens participating with particular energy in the poverty relief efforts of the AHW included Clara Jungmittag, Charlotte Niehaus, Helene Kaisen and Anna Stiegler.

=== "Kampfgemeinschaft gegen den Faschismus" (KGF) ===
On a more expressly political front Ella Ehlers was a founder member and leading activist in support of her husband in the Fight against Fascism Society ("Kampfgemeinschaft gegen den Faschismus" / KGF) set up during April/May 1945 by Adolf Ehlers and Hermann Wolters. Based in Bremen, the association had a membership of 6,500 by the end of May 1945. Always intended as a left-wing movement, it was in effect a joint project of the Communist and SPD (parties). However, by October 1945 it had become clear that for the communist members the KGF was in effect a device whereby the two parties might be merged and become a single left-wing party in Bremen and more broadly. The goal of political unity on the left in order to block any risk of a National Socialist revival was an attractive one, but the terms on which the communists wanted to engineer it seemed to involve domination by the Communist elements, taking direction from Moscow. The 1946 party merger in the Soviet zone and its brutally choreographed aftermath indicate that such fears were soundly based. Meanwhile on Bremen, in December 1945, all concerned agreed to the dissolution of the KGF, just seven months after its creation.

=== "Arbeiterwohlfahrt" (AWO) ===
By 1947 much of the rubble had been cleared from the city, and following the departure of its communist members the "Bremer Arbeiterhilfswerk" decided to subsume itself into the national Workers' Welfare organisation ("Arbeiterwohlfahrt" / AWO. After that change took effect, in 1948, Ella Ehlers continued to play an important part in the AWO, accepting the chairmanship of its Bremen branch in 1961.

She was intimately involved in setting up the "Nachbarschaftshaus am Ohlenhof" (subsequently renamed "Nachbarschaftshaus Helene Kaisen") in Bremen-Gröpelingen. Funded principally by a single large donation from the Unitarian Universalist Service Committee (and including a 150,000 Mark donation from the Henry Ford Foundation), and opened in 1952, it is described in sources as "Bremen's first [US-style] community centre". Gröpelingen was a central traditionally working class district of the city, particularly badly affected by the war. The choice of Bremen for the generous donation from North America is attributed to the excellent US contacts that Adolf and Ella Ehlers had established and cultivated. It was a major project, on which Ella Ehlers worked closely with Helene Kaisen, wife of Bremen's first post-war mayor, and chairwoman of the association committee that was set up to administer the funding.

The Gröpelingen Community Center was only the first in a succession of initiatives in which Ella Ehlers took a lead. These included mother and child homes, day-care centres for the elderly, home-care provision for the sick, "meals on wheels" provision and local recreation centres for the elderly. One of these, the Bremen-west social centre ("Sozialzentrum Bremer Westen"), inaugurated in December 1971, was renamed as the "Ella Ehlers centre" ("Ella-Ehlers-Haus") in 1991. It would appear that none of these later projects quite matched the Gröpelingen Community Center in terms of the sheer scale of the ambition and vision involved, but they continue, in most cases, to flourish, providing a lasting tribute to a woman whose name will always be associated with implementing practical solutions to identified welfare needs in Bremen.

In 1961 Ella Ehlers took over the leadership of the Bremen AWO from her political comrade and friend Charlotte Niehaus, chairing the organisation's regional committee till 1970 and its committee for the entire state (of which she had become chairwoman in 1964) till 1980. After that she continued to participate as honorary chairwoman almost till her death.

=== Final years ===
Adolf Ehlers died on 20 May 1978. The marriage had been a good one and there are indications that Ella Ehlers never fully recovered from the loss.

The lawyer-politician Henning Scherf was a political ally to Adolf and Elly Ehlers who between 1995 and 2005 served as 6th President of the Senate and Mayor of Berlin. During the final part of Elly Ehlers' life he visited her a number of times. In his 2013 book "Altersreise" (loosely, "The journey through old age" he provides a remarkably clear summary of her life during those final weeks. She was in her mid-70s: she appeared fit and healthy, but was nevertheless becoming more withdrawn. She would still attend executive committee meetings of the Bremen AWO (of which she remained honorary president) if she was asked to do so, but no longer turned up uninvited. There were a few occasions on which Scherf himself persuaded her to accompany him to political events. As a young ambitious senator he enjoyed the kudos to be gained by turning up with "an old lady with such a biography". But on those occasions he was too preoccupied with her celebrity to notice that she was actually becoming more and more lonely.

In the end Elly Ehlers hanged herself in her apartment. She tied a rope round her neck, fixed the other end round a heating pipe, and then jumped off the end of the bath on the edge of which she had been standing. There can be no certainty as to her motivation, but friends believe that the continuing grief over her husband's death seven years earlier and the knowledge that her eyesight was failing were both important factors.

== Awards and honours ==
- 1962 when Lufthansa's fastest and most modern airliner entered service, Ella Ehlers was honoured with the responsibility of "christening" it "Bremen" in a public ceremony at the airport.
- 1978 Order of Merit ("Großes Verdienstkreuz")
- 1980 Marie-Juchacz-Plakette award for service to workers' welfare from the AWO.
- 1991 The Ella-Ehlers-Haus, a community centre opened two decades earlier in Bremen-Gröpelingen, was renamed in her honour.
