= Böhrnsen =

Böhrnsen is a German surname. Notable people with the surname include:

- Gustav Böhrnsen (1914–1998), German politician
- Jens Böhrnsen (born 1949), German politician
