= 1995 Bremen state election =

Election in Bremen, Germany

← 1991	14 May 1995	1999 →

All 100 seats in the Bürgerschaft of Bremen 51 seats needed for a majority
- Turnout: 344,440 (68.6%) ▼3.6%
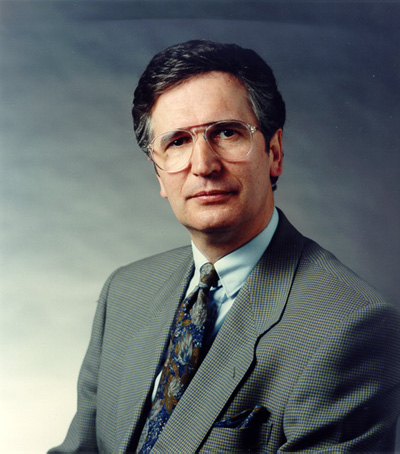

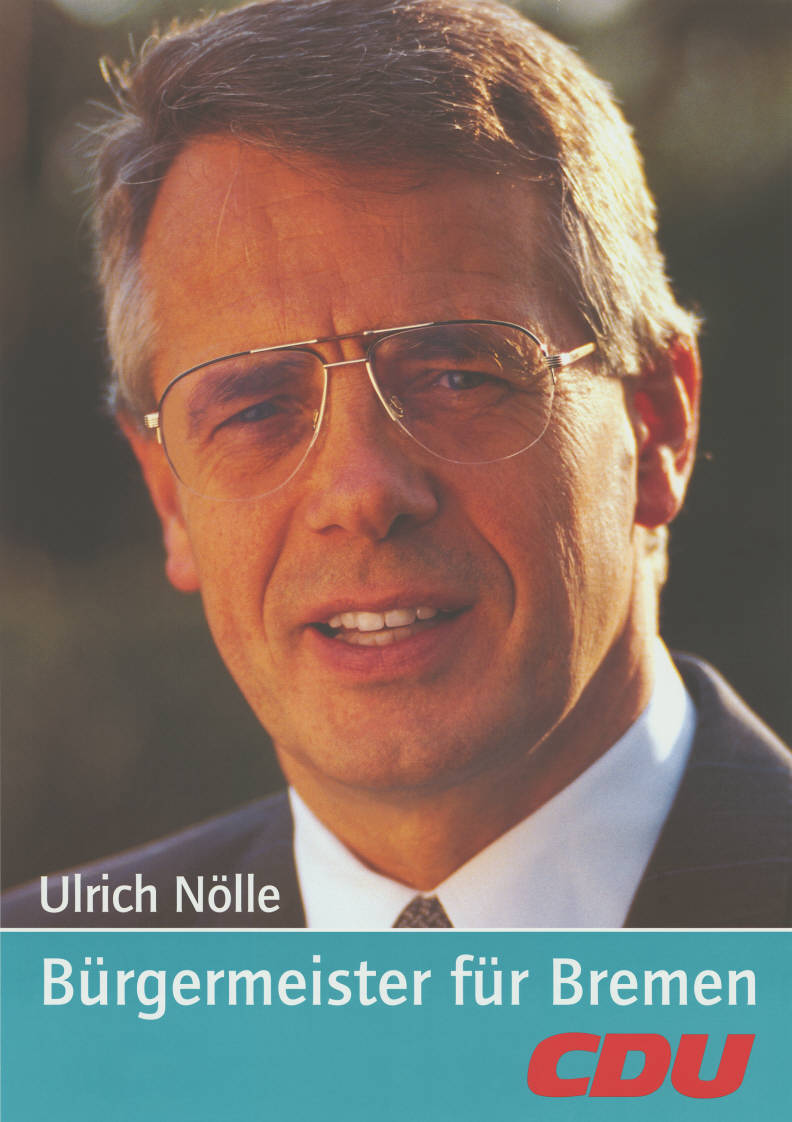
	First party	Second party
Leader	Klaus Wedemeier	Ulrich Nölle
Party	SPD	CDU
Last election	41 seats, 38.8%	32 seats, 30.7%
Seats won	37	37
Seat change	▼4	▲5
Popular vote	115,001	112,301
Percentage	33.4%	32.6%
Swing	▼5.4%	▲1.9%
	Third party	Fourth party
Party	Greens	AFB
Last election	11 seats, 11.4%	Did not exist
Seats won	14	12
Seat change	▲3	▲12
Popular vote	44,977	36,735
Percentage	13.1%	10.7%
Swing	▲1.7%	New party
Mayor before election
Klaus Wedemeier
SPD
Elected Mayor
Henning Scherf
SPD

The 1995 Bremen state election was held on 14 May 1995 to elect the members of the Bürgerschaft of Bremen, as well as the city councils of Bremen and Bremerhaven. The incumbent coalition was a traffic light coalition of the Social Democratic Party (SPD), The Greens, and the Free Democratic Party (FDP) led by Mayor Klaus Wedemeier. The coalition was defeated as the FDP lost its representation in the Bürgerschaft. The SPD narrowly remained the most popular party, though they tied with the Christian Democratic Union (CDU) in number of seats won. The major winner of the election was Labour for Bremen and Bremerhaven (AFB), a splinter from the SPD formed in January 1995 which espoused economic liberalism. The party entered the Bürgerschaft with 10.7% of votes cast and 12 seats.

After the election, Mayor Wedemeier resigned. The SPD and CDU subsequently formed a grand coalition under new SPD Mayor Henning Scherf.

== Parties ==
The table below lists parties represented in the previous Bürgerschaft of Bremen.

Name		Ideology	Leader(s)	1991 result	
Name		Ideology	Leader(s)	Votes (%)	Seats
SPD	Social Democratic Party of Germany; Sozialdemokratische Partei Deutschlands	Social democracy	Klaus Wedemeier	38.8%	41 / 100
CDU	Christian Democratic Union of Germany; Christlich Demokratische Union Deutschlands	Christian democracy	Ulrich Nölle	30.7%	32 / 100
Grüne	Alliance 90/The Greens; Bündnis 90/Die Grünen	Green politics		11.4%	11 / 100
FDP	Free Democratic Party; Freie Demokratische Partei	Classical liberalism		9.5%	10 / 100
DVU	German People's Union; Deutsche Volksunion	German nationalism		6.2%	6 / 100

== Election result ==
Summary of the 14 May 1995 election results for the Bürgerschaft of Bremen
Party	Votes	%	+/–	Seats	+/–
Social Democratic Party (SPD)	115,001	33.39	-5.4	37	-4
Christian Democratic Union (CDU)	112,301	32.60	+1.7	37	+5
Alliance 90/The Greens (Grüne)	44,977	13.06	+1.7	14	3
Labour for Bremen and Bremerhaven (AFB)	36,735	10.67	New	12	New
Free Democratic Party (FDP)	11,607	3.37	-6.1	0	-10
German People's Union (DVU)	8,503	2.47	-3.7	0	-6
Party of Democratic Socialism (PDS)	8,174	2.37	+2.4	0	±0
Others	7,142	2.07		0	±0
Total	344,440	100.00	–	100	–

Popular Vote
SPD	33.39%
CDU	32.60%
B'90/GRÜNE	13.06%
AFB	10.67%
FDP	3.37%
DVU	2.47%
PDS	2.37%
Other	2.07%

Bürgerschaft seats
SPD	37.00%
CDU	37.00%
B'90/GRÜNE	14.00%
AFB	12.00%
