= Mevissen =

Mevissen is a surname. Notable people with the surname include:

- Annemarie Mevissen (1914–2006), German politician
- Gerhard Mevissen (born 1956), German artist
- Gustav von Mevissen (1815–1899), German businessman and politician
- Mathilde von Mevissen (1848–1924), German activist and politician
