= 2003 Bremen state election =

State election in Bremen, Germany

- 25 May 2003

All 83 seats in the Bürgerschaft of Bremen 42 seats needed for a majority
- Turnout: 291,766 (61.3%) ▲1.2%
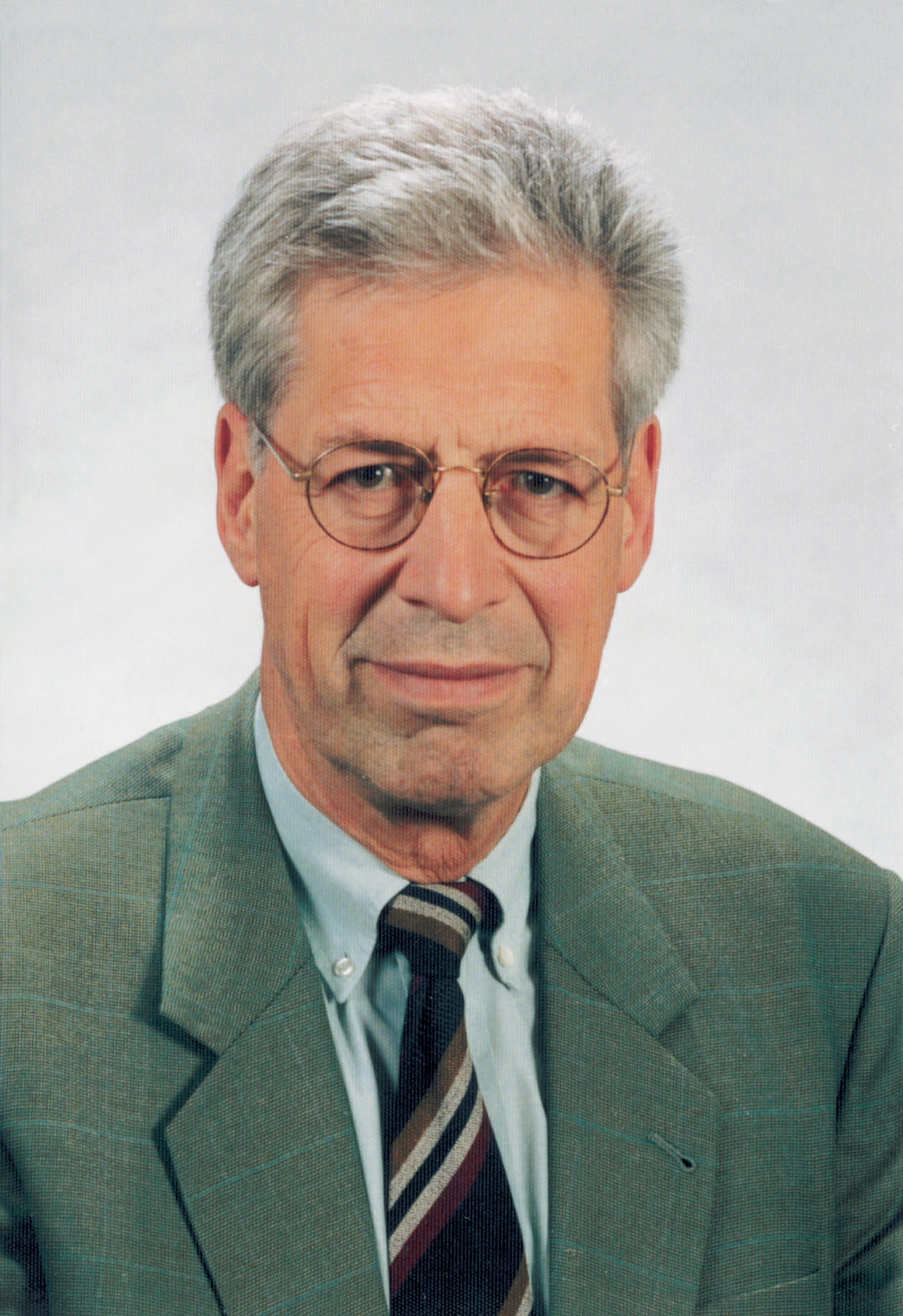
	First party	Second party	Third party
Leader	Henning Scherf
Party	SPD	CDU	Greens
Last election	47 seats, 42.6%	42 seats, 37.1%	10 seats, 8.9%
Seats won	40	29	12
Seat change	▼7	▼13	▲2
Popular vote	123,480	86,819	37,350
Percentage	42.3%	29.8%	12.8%
Swing	▼0.3%	▼7.3%	▲3.9%
	Fourth party	Fifth party
Party	FDP	DVU
Last election	0 seats, 2.5%	1 seat, 3.0%
Seats won	1	1
Seat change	▲1	0
Popular vote	12,294	6,642
Percentage	4.2%	2.3%
Swing	▲1.7%	▼0.7%
Mayor before election
Henning Scherf
SPD
Elected Mayor
Henning Scherf
SPD

The 2003 Bremen state election was held on 25 May 2003 to elect the members of the Bürgerschaft of Bremen, as well as the city councils of Bremen and Bremerhaven. The incumbent grand coalition of the Social Democratic Party (SPD) and Christian Democratic Union (CDU) led by Mayor Henning Scherf retained its majority and continued in office.

== Parties ==
The table below lists parties represented in the previous Bürgerschaft of Bremen.

Name		Ideology	Leader(s)	1999 result	
Name		Ideology	Leader(s)	Votes (%)	Seats
SPD	Social Democratic Party of Germany; Sozialdemokratische Partei Deutschlands	Social democracy	Henning Scherf	42.6%	47 / 100
CDU	Christian Democratic Union of Germany; Christlich Demokratische Union Deutschlands	Christian democracy		37.1%	42 / 100
Grüne	Alliance 90/The Greens; Bündnis 90/Die Grünen	Green politics		8.9%	10 / 100
DVU	German People's Union; Deutsche Volksunion	German nationalism		3.0%	1 / 100

== Opinion polling ==
Polling firm	Fieldwork date	Sample size	SPD	CDU	Grüne	DVU	PDS	FDP	Others	Lead
2003 state election	25 May 2003	–	42.3	29.8	12.8	2.3	1.7	4.2	6.9	12.5
Infratest dimap	13–15 May 2003	1,000	38	36	12	2	2	5	5	2
Forschungsgruppe Wahlen	5–8 May 2003	1,003	38	36	14	–	–	5	7	2
Forsa	24–30 Apr 2003	1,194	37	38	14	–	–	4	7	1
Infratest dimap	25–28 Apr 2003	1,000	42.5	34	13	–	2	4.5	4	8.5
Infratest	16 Apr 2003	?	42	35	13	–	–	4	6	7
1999 state election	6 June 1999	–	42.6	37.1	8.9	3.0	2.9	2.5	2.9	5.5

== Election result ==
Summary of the 25 May 2003 election results for the Bürgerschaft of Bremen
Party	Votes	%	+/–	Seats	+/–
Social Democratic Party (SPD)	123,480	42.32	-0.3	40	-7
Christian Democratic Union (CDU)	86,819	29.76	-7.3	29	-13
Alliance 90/The Greens (Grüne)	37,350	12.80	+3.9	12	+2
Free Democratic Party (FDP)	12,294	4.21	+1.7	1	+1
German People's Union (DVU)	6,642	2.28	-0.7	1	±0
Party for a Rule of Law Offensive (PRO)	12,876	4.41	+4.4	0	±0
Party of Democratic Socialism (PDS)	4,885	1.67	-1.2	0	±0
Others	7,420	2.54	2.5	0	±0
Total	291,766	100.00	–	83	–

Popular Vote
SPD	42.32%
CDU	29.76%
B'90/GRÜNE	12.80%
PRO	4.41%
FDP	4.21%
DVU	2.28%
PDS	1.67%
Other	2.54%

Bürgerschaft seats
SPD	48.19%
CDU	34.94%
B'90/GRÜNE	14.46%
FDP	1.20%
DVU	1.20%

== Sources ==
- The Federal Returning Officer
