= Annemarie Mevissen =

German politician (1914–2006)

- Born: Annemarie Gesine Schmidt; 24 October 1914; Bremen-Burglesum, Germany
- Died: 13 July 2006 (aged 91); Bremen, Germany
- Occupation: politician
- Known for: Bremen senator (1951-1975)
- Political party: SPD
- Spouse: Werner Mevissen (1911-1978)
- Children: Ulrike; Edmund
- Parent(s): Wilhelm Schmidt (1883-1975); Gesine Schmidt

Annemarie Mevissen (born Annemarie Schmidt: 24 October 1914 – 13 July 2006) was a German politician (SPD). She served between 1951 and 1975 as a Bremen senator. Between 1967 and 1975 she was deputy president (deputy mayor) of the state of Bremen ("Freie Hansestadt Bremen"). That meant that in 1967 she became the first woman to reach that position in any of the eleven states ("Bundesländer") of the German Federal Republic (West Germany).

== Life ==
=== Provenance and early years ===
Annemarie Gesine Schmidt was born in Werderland, a part of Bremen's Burglesum quarter, on the city's northern side, where she grew up alongside her elder brother Hans. She came from a traditionally Social Democratic (SPD) family. Wilhelm Schmidt (1883-1975), her father, was one of the most high-profile SPD politicians in Bremen during the Weimar years. He had been removed from public service in 1933 by the Nazis and later spent several years in a labour camp. Directly after the war Wilhelm Schmidt took a leading role in reconstructing the city's administration, and he was one of the authors of the Bremen constitution which came into force in 1947.

Annemarie Schmidt attended secondary school locally, in 1934 passing her school final exams ("Abitur"), which under more normal circumstances would have opened the way to university-level education. The Nazis had taken power at the beginning of the previous year and little by little transformed the country into a one-party dictatorship. She was blocked from training as a teacher because she was deemed "politically unreliable". That may have been because her father was a known critic of the government. Her involvement in the Young Socialists would also have counted against her. She was, however, able to find an apprenticeship in the book trade, which led to jobs successively in Leipzig, Marburg and Göttingen.

Through her work she met the young librarian Werner Mevissen in Leipzig. They were married in 1943. As 1945 began, Annemarie Mevissen was heavily pregnant. Her parents had relocated to a small house at Oberneuland on the eastern side of Bremen in 1934, and it was to this home that the young couple returned. Their daughter, Ulrike, was born almost at once, in January 1945. Around this same time Annemarie's father was liberated from the labour camp where he had been held, and the (now) three generation family were reunited. The Mevissens' son, Edmund, was born in 1948.

=== Politics ===
It would have been conventional for the mother of a new baby to stay at home and care for her child, but Gesine Schmidt, Annemarie's own mother, proved exceptionally able and enthusiastic both in managing the home and as a "hands-on" grandmother. Far from staying at home, Annemarie quickly plunged into public life outside the home, concentrating in the first instance on youth work. She gathered children from the refugee camps and farmsteads in the surrounding countryside and organised sports and drama based activities for them. A surviving picture from 1947 shows her holding her baby daughter while surrounded by "child-friends", standing in front of a large round tent that the US army of occupation had made available.

Through her father's contacts, Mevissen quickly found her way into city politics. He involved her in his work on the drafting of the Bremen constitution. In October 1946 she was a candidate for election to the city's constitutional assembly, which was the precursor body for a return to democratic city governance. Her election literature placed emphasis on the way that women's exclusion from political life had contributed to the poisoning of politics during the Nazi years, and how important it was that women should now take their place on the political stage. She included the phrase (already widely used by women candidates in the post-Nazi era) "equal pay for equal work". Although she was narrowly defeated by Friedrich Behrens in 1946, in 1947 Annemarie Mevissen was elected to the Bremen parliament ("Bürgerschaft"). Still aged only 33, she was the youngest member of the assembly. Not everyone was impressed. Many years later, her SPD colleague Luise Nordhold would recall: "Comrades were against it, simply because [she] was a woman" („Die Genossen waren dagegen, nur weil Annemarie Mevissen eine Frau war. "). Sources also place emphasis on the extent to which it was still unusual for SPD members, whose backgrounds were largely working-class, to have completed their schooling up to the level of the "Abitur" (secondary school leaving exam). In parliamentary debates the extent of her education enabled Mevissen to contribute, from the start, on equal terms with older male members of the leftwing parties.

While Annemarie was drawn into politics Werner Mevissen worked for three decades following the war as the highly effective director of the Bremen public library.

In 1951, still the mother of two pre-school age children, she was appointed to the senate by Mayor Wilhelm Kaisen, taking on the schools and youth portfolio. The senate reflected a grand coalition agreement, but the SPD usually dominated the Bremen senate, at this point holding seven of the fourteen places in it: Mevrissen would continue as the Senator for Youth Affairs till 1975 - with "Welfare" (today "social affairs") transferred to her departmental responsibilities in 1959.

In 1967 Mevrissen was elected to a mayoral position, becoming deputy to the Senate President, fellow SPDS member Hans Koschnick. This made her the first woman to be elected deputy head of any state in West Germany. She retained the position till 1975. That a woman should hold the position gave rise to such am unconventional situation that, at her own request, her official title was always given as "Bürgermeister" - using the male form of the word in German - rather than "Bürgermeisterin", the female form that would be used without hesitation today, now that the unspoken taboo on women reaching top positions in politics has been broken (at least in Germany). There is therefore, in the German language, a pleasingly ironical internal contradiction in the title of a biography that appeared in 2011 as "Frau Bürgermeister Annemarie Mevissen" (and not as "Frau Bürgermeisterin Annemarie Mevissen" ").

The newly elected deputy mayor came to national prominence in 1968 in connection with the Bremen tram riots of January 1968. Protests against public transport fare increases were genuine enough, but the passions arising were underpinned by wider political concerns on the part of many students in the context of Cold War tensions and in respect of issues such as the escalation of the Vietnam War. (Unlike the rest of northern West Germany, Bremen had hosted, from the end of the war till 1954, not just the British army, but also a succession of US army units.) Perceiving a risk that the rioting might "get out of hand", Annemarie Mevissen personally clambered onto a disused packing case and addressed the crowd, finding the right words to steer a dangerous public-order situation back towards dialogue. Background awareness of gender issues is apparent from the way that headline writers (and others) during this period liked to describe her as the "only man in the Bremen senate".

In February 1975, at her own wish, Annemarie Mevissen retired from public office. Despite being only a few months past her sixtieth birthday, she had by this time become the longest serving minister in any of West Germany's federal state governments ("Landesregierungen").

=== Active retirement ===
After dropping out of politics Mevissen gained recognition locally as an artist. Her pictures featuring Bremen themes regularly appear in exhibitions at the Bremen parliament building and elsewhere. She also wrote various books about the city.

== Celebration ==
- In 1975 Mevissen received the Bremen Medal of Honour in gold
- On 6 May 2005 her name was added to the Schedule of Bremen's honoured citizens
- The children's home Annemarie Mevissen in Bremen's Martin-Buber-Straße was named in her honour.
- On 12 November 2014 a hitherto nameless street in Bremen-Wallanlagen has been renamed as the Bürgermeisterin-Mevissen-Weg

== Output (selection) ==
- Am Rande der Stadt Bremen: Oberneuland. Hauschild, 1979
- Im Herzen der Stadt Bremen: Der Bürgerpark. Hauschild 1980
- Erzählte Bilder aus der Provence. Hauschild, 1982
- Erlebtes aus der Politik. Hauschild, 1984.
- Die Bremer Wallanlage. Hauschild, 1988.
- Hinter den Deichen: Die Wümmeniederung. Hauschild 1989
- Die Weser – Begleitet von Sagen, Märchen und Legenden. Hauschild, 1990
- Alte Parks am Rande der Stadt Bremen. Hauschild, 1992
- Vor den Toren der Stadt Bremen – das Oldenburger Land. Hauschild, 1993
- Mit Pinsel und Zeichenstift auf Reisen in Europa. Hauschild, 1994
