= 1991 Bremen state election =

Election in Bremen, Germany

← 1987	29 September 1991	1995 →

All 100 seats in the Bürgerschaft of Bremen 51 seats needed for a majority
- Turnout: 370,148 (72.2%) ▼3.4%
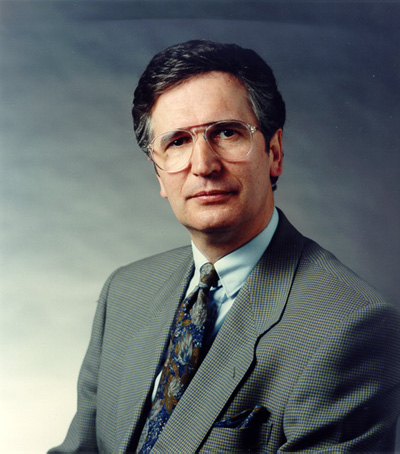
	First party	Second party	Third party
Leader	Klaus Wedemeier
Party	SPD	CDU	Greens
Last election	54 seats, 50.5%	25 seats, 23.4%	10 seats, 10.2%
Seats won	41	32	11
Seat change	▼13	▲7	▲1
Popular vote	143,576	113,512	42,096
Percentage	38.8%	30.7%	11.4%
Swing	▼11.7%	▲7.3%	▲1.2%
	Fourth party	Fifth party
Party	FDP	DVU
Last election	10 seats, 10.0%	1 seats, 3.4%
Seats won	10	6
Seat change	0	▲5
Popular vote	36,087	22,878
Percentage	9.5%	6.2%
Swing	▼0.5%	▲2.8%
Mayor before election
Klaus Wedemeier
SPD
Elected Mayor
Klaus Wedemeier
SPD

The 1991 Bremen state election was held on 29 September 1991 to elect the members of the Bürgerschaft of Bremen, as well as the city councils of Bremen and Bremerhaven. The incumbent Social Democratic Party (SPD) government led by Mayor Klaus Wedemeier lost its majority, suffering an 11.7-point swing against it. The SPD subsequently formed a traffic light coalition with The Greens and the Free Democratic Party (FDP), and Wedemeier was re-elected as Mayor.

== Parties ==
The table below lists parties represented in the previous Bürgerschaft of Bremen.

Name		Ideology	Leader(s)	1987 result	
Name		Ideology	Leader(s)	Votes (%)	Seats
SPD	Social Democratic Party of Germany; Sozialdemokratische Partei Deutschlands	Social democracy	Klaus Wedemeier	50.5%	54 / 100
CDU	Christian Democratic Union of Germany; Christlich Demokratische Union Deutschlands	Christian democracy		23.4%	25 / 100
Grüne	The Greens; Die Grünen	Green politics		10.2%	10 / 100
FDP	Free Democratic Party; Freie Demokratische Partei	Classical liberalism		10.0%	10 / 100
DVU	German People's Union; Deutsche Volksunion	German nationalism		3.4%	1 / 100

== Election result ==
Summary of the 29 September 1991 election results for the Bürgerschaft of Bremen
Party	Votes	%	+/–	Seats	+/–
Social Democratic Party (SPD)	143,576	38.79	-11.7	41	-13
Christian Democratic Union (CDU)	113,512	30.67	+7.3	32	+7
Alliance 90/The Greens (Grüne)	42,096	11.37	+1.2	11	+1
Free Democratic Party (FDP)	35,087	9.48	-0.5	10	±0
German People's Union (DVU)	22,878	6.18	+2.8	6	+5
The Grays – Gray Panthers (Graue)	6,157	1.66	New	0	New
The Republicans (REP)	5,694	1.54	+0.3	0	±0
Others	1,148	0.31		0	±0
Total	370,148	100.00	–	100	–

Popular Vote
SPD	38.79%
CDU	30.67%
GRÜNE	11.37%
FDP	9.48%
DVU	6.18%
Other	3.51%

Bürgerschaft seats
SPD	41.00%
CDU	32.00%
GRÜNE	11.00%
FDP	10.00%
DVU	6.00%
