= Wilhelm Kaisen =

German politician (1887–1979)

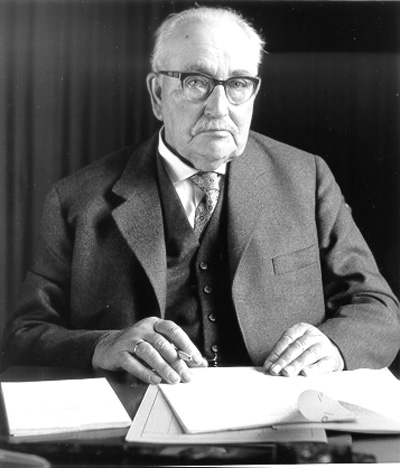

President of the Senate and Mayor of Bremen
- In office 1 August 1945 – 17 July 1965
- Deputy: Jules Eberhard Noltenius; Adolf Ehlers; Willy Dehnkamp
- Preceded by: Erich Vagts
- Succeeded by: Willy Dehnkamp

President of the Bundesrat
- In office 1 November 1958 – 31 October 1959
- Preceded by: Willy Brandt
- Succeeded by: Franz-Josef Röder

Personal details
- Born: 22 May 1887 Hamburg, German Empire
- Died: 19 December 1979 (aged 92) Bremen, West Germany
- Party: Social Democratic Party
- Spouse: Helene Kaisen
- Children: 4

Carl Wilhelm Kaisen (22 May 1887 – 19 December 1979) was a German politician from the Social Democratic Party of Germany (SPD) who served as the 2nd President of the Senate and Mayor of Bremen from 1945 to 1965. In 1958/59 he served as the 10th President of the Bundesrat. He became a symbolic figure of the German reconstruction in Bremen after 1945.

== Biography ==
Kaisen was born in the German city of Hamburg, and spent his youth there. His family's poverty did not allow him to visit a higher school or even receive a high school education. In 1905 he became a member of the SPD. After World War I, he moved to his wife's home city of Bremen. Influenced by his family, he got the SPD into the parliament of Bremen (Bürgerschaft). From 1919 to 1928 he was a journalist and editor-in-chief of the SPD newspaper Bremer Bürger-Zeitung. From 1920 to 1928 he was member of the Bürgerschaft. In 1928, Kaisen became the SPD Senator of Social Services in the Senate of Bremen. In March 1933, he was pressured to resign by the Nazis.

Kaisen was not involved in politics during the Nazism era. He spent his time with agricultural work in the suburb of Bremen-Borgfeld.

On 1 August 1945, the US military government made Kaisen mayor of Bremen. Supported by the Liberals as well as the Communists he tried to re-establish the political and economical structures of the Weimar Republic. He was re-elected by the people of Bremen during the first free elections after the war. In July 1965, after nearly twenty years in office, he resigned as mayor.

Kaisen was very popular with the general public, but less so within the SPD itself. His support for the decision to position Germany within NATO led to a break with SPD chairman Kurt Schumacher.

Kaisen died in Bremen on 19 December 1979.

== Honours ==
Although not well known in the rest of Germany, Wilhelm Kaisen is held in high regard in Bremen and Bremerhaven. A number of things were named in his honor:

- Wilhelm Kaisen High School in the Neustadt district
- Wilhelm Kaisen, a rescue cruiser of the Maritime Search and Rescue Service (in service from 1978 to 2012)
- Wilhelm Kaisen Bridge, the great Weser bridge in the center of the city
- A container terminal in Bremerhaven (since 1971)

There are also several streets and squares in both cities named after Kaisen and his wife. There is also a Wilhelm Kaisen statue at Herdentor near Bremen central station and a Wilhelm Kaisen bust, which is located in Borgfeld, a north-eastern district of Bremen.

== Literature ==
- Karl-Ludwig Sommer: Wilhelm Kaisen. Eine politische Biographie. Hrsg. von der Wilhelm-und-Helene-Kaisen-Stiftung Bremen, Verlag J. H. W. Dietz Nachf., Bonn 2000, 541 S., geb., ISBN 3-8012-0293-3
- Hans Koschnick, Hg.: Zuversicht und Beständigkeit. Wilhelm Kaisen. Eine Dokumentation. Bremen 1977. ISBN 3-87681-069-8.

== See also ==
- List of mayors of Bremen

Political offices
Preceded by Erich Vagts	Mayor of Bremen; 1945–1965	Succeeded by Willy Dehnkamp
