= Pfahl =

Pfahl is a German language metonymic occupational surname for someone who made posts and stakes or erected them. Notable people with the name include:

- Armin Pfahl-Traughber (born 1963), German political scientist, sociologist and government official
- John Pfahl (1939–2020), American photographer
- Wolfgang Pfahl (1947–2021), German politician
