= Erich Vagts =

German politician (1896–1980)

Erich Vagts (9 February 1896 in Cuxhaven – 20 February 1980 in Bremen) was a German politician who served as the 1st President of the Senate and Mayor of Bremen in 1945.

After finishing his final exams at the German secondary school Erich Vagts became a soldier during the First World War. In 1919 he began his studies of law and political science at the University of Tübingen and the University of Kiel. Vagts did not finish his studies but became director of a consortium of farmers in Güstrow which was typical for Germany in the time after the First World War. After his return to Bremen in 1925 Vagts began his political career. He became chief executive officer of the German National People's Party, the Deutschnationale Volkspartei (DNVP). From 1928 Vagts belonged to the Bürgerschaft of Bremen (city-state parliament). In 1931 Erich Vagts became chairman of the DNVP and two years later he was elected to the position of a senator for the health resort in the city state of Bremen.

On September 30, 1933 Vagts left the Senate of Bremen and became President of a supervising body for the villages in Bremen. He expanded his influence in 1938 as a representative of the region of Oldenburg in the German Reich.

On May 5, 1945 the allied forces appointed Vagts to provisional mayor, on June 6 to the Mayor of Bremen.

After a political affair involving communist and social democratic senators he was removed from office and arrested for 6 months. His successor became Wilhelm Kaisen, a member of the Social Democratic Party of Germany SPD.

In 1933 Vagts became President of the philharmonic society and was put in charge of the musical events in the municipal city of Bremen. He gave up the position in 1938/1939.

== Literature ==
- Herbert Schwarzwälder: Das Große Bremen-Lexikon. Edition Temmen, 2003, ISBN 3-86108-693-X
