= Willi Dehnkamp =

German politician (1903–1985)

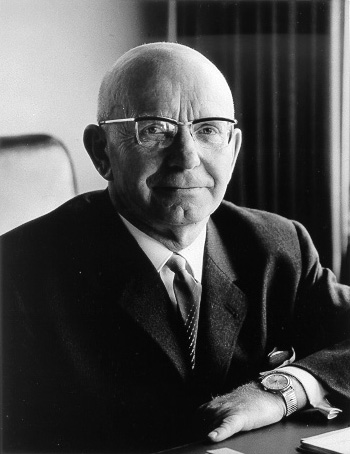
Willy Dehnkamp

Willy Dehnkamp (22 July 1903 – 12 November 1985) was a German politician of the Social Democratic Party (SPD) who served as the 3rd President of the Senate and Mayor of Bremen from 1965 to 1967.

== Biography ==
Willy Dehnkamp was born as the son of a workers family in Hamburg-Altona. He wanted to become a seaman but instead trained as a locksmith. At age 16 he became a member of the union of metal workers and shortly later he joined the Social Democratic Party of Germany.

Dehnkamp was president of the socialistic youth of Hamburg and took over the leadership of the SPD in the district of Blumenthal. During the municipal elections in 1933 he defeated his NSDAP-candidate. Ten days after publishing the results he was arrested for seven months. After his release from prison Dehnkamp began establishing the underground movement of the SPD which was forbidden during that time. In March 1935 the Gestapo arrested him for 2 years and 9 months. After his release on X-mast 1936 he had to join the army, was wounded and imprisoned for 3.5 years by the Russian army.

In 1949 the Senate of Bremen made him chief officer of Bremen-Blumenthal, followed by the position of Senator of Education on 29 September 1951. Between 26 November 1963 and 19 July 1965 he was mayor and vice-president of the Senate. Succeeding Wilhelm Kaisen he became President of the Senate. After the SPD lost its majority in the Senate in 1967 he gave up this position. Hans Koschnick followed him in this position. Dehnkamp retreated from politics but stayed a member of the German advisory council of education.

Dehnkamp died on 12 November 1985, aged 82, and was buried on the cemetery in Lüssum.

Political offices
Preceded by Wilhelm Kaisen	Mayor of Bremen; 1965–1967	Succeeded by Hans Koschnick
