= Charlotte Niehaus =

Charlotte Niehaus (born Charlotte Schnackenberg: 30 September 1882 – 19 February 1975) was a welfare pioneer, a politician (USPD, SPD and, between 1920 and 1933, a member of the Bremen state parliament ("Bürgerschaft").

After the war she did not return to mainstream politics. Nevertheless, according to one admirer she was a leading figure among those who helped recreate a democratic social structure in the young German Federal Republic, reversing the destructive ravages of National Socialism, and drawing on her experience of the social democratic welfare tradition that had blossomed in Bremen and elsewhere during the Weimar years.

== Life ==
=== Provenance and early years ===
Charlotte "Schnackenberg" was born in Ottersberg, a short distance to the east of Bremen. She was the third child of the carpenter / woodworker Friedrich Schnackenberg and his wife Katharine. She grew up in the village, attending the village school between 1888 and 1896. She spent a year as a kindergarten assistant and then moved to the city and in 1898 entered domestic service, working for the Laßmann family at their home in Bremen-Schwachhausen till 1904. That was when she married the tailor Hermann Niehaus. Their daughter, Bertha, was born later than same year. Their son, Hermann, was born in 1907.

=== City living and political engagement ===
The young family settled first in Bremen-Findorff and later in Bremen-Steintor, which were both central parts of the city. They took in a couple of lodgers and Charlotte Niehaus worked with her husband. Tailoring work was paid by the piece rather than by the hour, and in the summer they often found themselves sitting together stitching away from five in the morning till the light faded at the end of the evening. Hermann Niehaus was a trades union stalwart and Charlotte became politicised through the marriage. In 1908 she joined the Social Democratic Party (SPD), her husband having already taken the same step two years earlier. (It was not permitted for women officially to become members of political parties until 1908.) From the outset she involved herself in what was identified at that time as the party's "women's work" ("Frauenarbeit"), along with party work more generally. War broke out in July 1914 and Hermann Niehaus went off to fight, but he came back in 1915 with a serious wound to his arm, as a result of which he was no longer able to pursue his trade in tailoring. In the end he got a job with the city works department ("Bremer Stadtwerken"). As the front line slaughter and austerity on the frontline became ever more intense Charlotte Niehaus with her friend Anna Stiegler and a number of other comrades to switch her political allegiance to the newly launched Independent Social Democratic Party ("Unabhängige Sozialdemokratische Partei Deutschlands" / USPD). The 1914 decision by the SPD leadership to declare what amounted to a parliamentary truce on the issue of funding for the war gave rise to dissent from party activists from the outset, and 1917 was the year when the SPD finally split apart over the issue.

=== Parliamentarian ===
1919 was a year of uprisings in the ports and cities, but it was also a year of new beginnings. On 28 November 1919 Charlotte Niehaus became a USPD member of the Bremen National Assembly, which was mandated to draft a new constitution for Bremen, suitable for a newly republican Germany, now ruled according to democratic precepts. City elections took place in May 1920. Candidates must be aged at least 20, and could be either men or women. A direct voting system was applied: the USPD won 37 of the 96 seats in the Bremen state parliament ("Bürgerschaft"). One of them was won by Charlotte Niehaus. She continued to be re-elected without a break for the next thirteen years. In 1922, when the USPD itself broke up, most of its former members joined the Communists. Charlotte Niehaus was part of the substantial minority that rejoined the Social Democrats, however. The focus of her work in the parliament was on welfare issues. Political colleagues found her practical and hard working, but not a deep thinker During her thirteen years of membership she only delivered ten speeches in the chamber, preferring to work in the background. She was, notably, a co-founder of the Bremen Workers' Welfare ("Arbeiterwohlfahrt") organisation which she led from 1928 till the organisation was abolished - as matters turned out, temporarily - after 1933.

=== National Socialist years ===
Following the change of government in January 1933 the authorities lost no time in transforming Germany into a one- party dictatorship. The Bremen state parliament ("Bürgerschaft") ceased to function effectively in March 1933, though the city only formally lost its autonomous status in January 1934, with the coming into force of the Law for the recreation of the state. Charlotte Niehaus lived a very withdrawn existence and was not politically active during the twelve National Socialist years: she was spared arrest or serious persecution. She nevertheless had to undergo several thorough house searches, and was under constant surveillance on account of her political past. She was required to report regularly to the Gestapo office in the city. Hermann, her son, was detained for several months on account of "defeatist utterances" ("...wegen defaitistischer Äußerungen").

=== Postwar developments ===
In the immediate aftermath of the war Bremen became part of the British occupation zone. In 1947 it became instead an exclave of the American occupation zone. Niehaus did not stand for election to the newly relaunched state parliament ("Bürgerschaft"), but she did work as an advisor to the city's welfare department and she renewed her involvement with the Workers' Welfare ("Arbeiterwohlfahrt") organisation. In 1954, two years after the death of her husband and by now herself aged 74, she took on the leadership of the Bremen Workers' Welfare ("Arbeiterwohlfahrt" / AWO) for the second time. In addition, in June 1951 she became a founding member of the "Bremen Neighborhoods House Association" ("Vereins Nachbarschaftshaus Bremen e.V."), set up on the initiative of the American Unitarian Social Work Community ("amerikanischen Sozialwerks Unitariergemeinschaft"), in close co-operation with the AWO. Under the leadership, till 1964, of Helene Kaisen the association was able to provide a new form of open social welfare provision at their premises - subsequently renamed "Helene Kaisen House" - which at that time was otherwise unknown in West Germany.

During the 1950s one of her most important achievements was the establishment of a home for unmarried mothers and their children in the Bremen-Neustadt quarter (on the left bank of the Weser). It opened in 1959. The home also housed young working women. Alongside her AWO responsibilities Charlotte Niehaus also involved herself in maternal recovery work and with the Bremen Women's Committee ("Bremer Frauenausschuss" / BFA), briefly serving as chairman during the early year in 1947/48.

In 1961 she passed the leadership of the Bremen AWO to her SPD comrade Ella Ehlers. In recognition of her forty year leadership she was now unanimously elected honorary Bremen-AWO president. In 1969 her contribution was also celebrated with the award of the Marie-Juchacz-Plakette (plaque).

== Personal ==
Charlotte Niehaus suffered the personal tragedy of being predeceased not just by her husband but also, in 1956 and 1961, by her two children. She herself died in her ninety-third year, looked after during the final part of her life by her granddaughter, and sustained by a powerful enthusiasm for Skat.
