= Traffic light coalition =

Type of coalition government

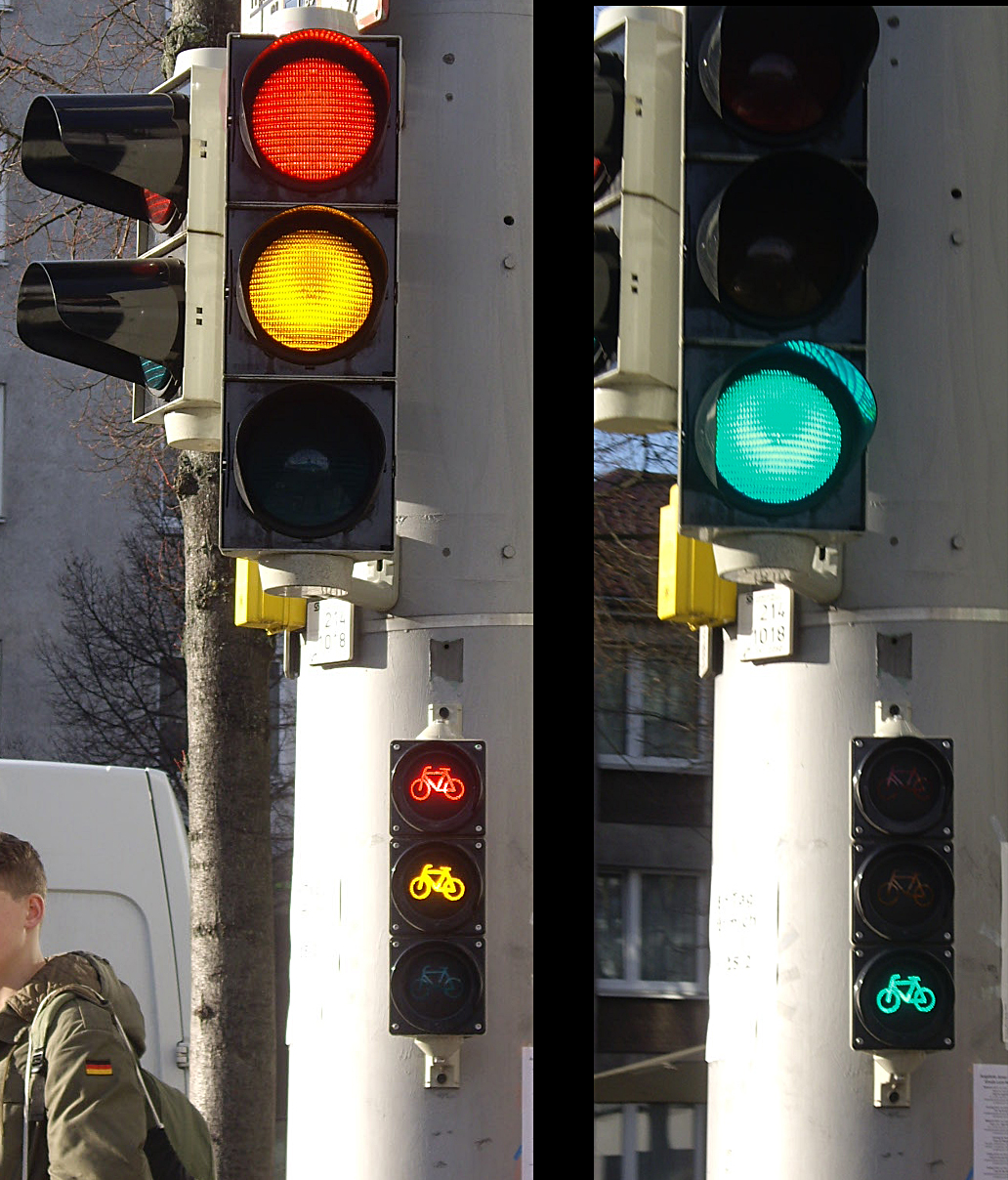
Traffic lights in Kassel. The three colours of the traffic lights are the colours of the parties in a "traffic light coalition".

In German politics, a traffic light coalition (German: Ampelkoalition) is a coalition government of the Social Democratic Party (SPD), the Free Democratic Party (FDP) and Alliance 90/The Greens. It is named after the parties' traditional colours, respectively red, yellow, and green, matching the colour sequence of a traffic light (Ampel). So far, the only instance of a traffic light coalition on a federal level in Germany has been in Olaf Scholz's cabinet between 2021 and its dissolution over disagreements in November 2024.

The term is also used for similar coalitions between social democrats, liberals and greens in other countries, which are frequently associated with the colours red, yellow, and green, respectively.

== History ==
At a state level, early traffic light coalitions occurred in Brandenburg between 1990 and 1994 and in Bremen between 1991 and 1995. Negotiations to form such a coalition following the 2001 Berlin state election were not successful; likewise, preliminary talks after the 2010 North Rhine-Westphalia state election led to no result. A traffic light coalition was formed in Rhineland-Palatinate following the 2016 Rhineland-Palatinate state election. The 2021 Rhineland-Palatinate state election marked the first time in German history that an outgoing traffic light coalition was replaced by a renewed traffic light coalition in a state election.

Logos of the Social Democratic Party, the Free Democratic Party, and Alliance 90/The Greens

Historically, there have been red–green coalitions between the SPD and the Greens (from 1998 to 2005) and social-liberal coalitions between the SPD and the FDP (from 1969 to 1982) in the Bundestag. Despite the common ground on cultural liberalism between the three parties, the FDP's economic liberalism and long association at the federal level with the conservative Christian Democratic Union (CDU) traditionally made such a coalition problematic, with former FDP chairman Guido Westerwelle explicitly ruling out this option for the 2009 federal election. Previously, the inconclusive 2005 federal election had produced media speculation about a traffic light coalition, but no such coalition was formed.

Following the 2021 federal election, the SPD emerged as the largest party in the Bundestag, with 25.7%, but did not have enough seats either to govern outright or together with the third place 14.7% Greens. With the SPD and the CDU ruling out a grand coalition with each other, a traffic light coalition was viewed as the most likely outcome by many in the media. On 24 November 2021, the SPD, Greens, and FDP announced that they had reached a deal to implement the coalition, with SPD candidate Olaf Scholz set to become chancellor. The coalition went into effect when Scholz and his cabinet took office on 8 December 2021. However, the coalition was dissolved on 6 November 2024 following disagreements between Scholz and his Finance Minister Christian Lindner, the leader of the FDP; after Lindner refused to support the planned 2025 federal budget, Scholz dismissed him and consequently all FDP ministers resigned, leaving a SPD-Greens minority government.

== Traffic light coalitions in other countries ==
=== Australia ===
In Australia, a "traffic light coalition" could refer to a coalition between the Labor Party, the Australian Greens and Australian Democrats. Though such a coalition was never formed, as Labor and the Greens never formed a coalition until the 2010 Tasmanian state election. However, following the 2001 Australian Capital Territory election, Labor formed a minority government supported by the Greens and the Democrats, the closest thing to a "traffic light" coalition ever experienced. In the lead up to the 2024 Tasmanian state election a coalition involving Labor, the Greens and the Jacqui Lambie Network was discussed. The JLN is not a liberal party but rather a big tent populist party, which however does use yellow as a party colour.

=== Austria ===
In Austria, the term Ampelkoalition has been borrowed from Germany to describe a theoretical coalition of the Social Democratic Party of Austria (SPÖ), The Greens, and a liberal party. In the 1990s, this referred to the Liberal Forum (LiF). In the 2010s, the term reemerged to describe a theoretical coalition of the SPÖ, Greens, and NEOS – The New Austria, the latter of which is the successor to the Liberal Forum. NEOS's colour is pink, rather than yellow.

=== Belgium ===
The Verhofstadt I Government of Belgium, headed by Prime Minister Guy Verhofstadt from 1999 to 2003, comprised liberals (the Flemish Liberals and Democrats and French-speaking Liberal Reformist Party), socialists (the Flemish Socialist Party and the French-speaking Socialist Party), and greens (the Flemish Agalev and the French-speaking Ecolo). However, as the political colours of the liberal parties were blue instead of yellow, it was known as the "purple-green" coalition.

=== Luxembourg ===
Following the 2013 general election in Luxembourg, negotiations started with the aim of forming a three-party coalition government comprising the Luxembourg Socialist Workers' Party (LSAP), the Democratic Party (DP) and The Greens in order to oust the Christian Social People's Party (CSV) of the incumbent Prime Minister Jean-Claude Juncker. This variant on the traffic light coalition is known as a "Gambia coalition" (Luxembourgish: Gambia(-)Koalitioun, Gambiakoalitioun), as the party colours match the flag of the Gambia, and Luxembourg's liberal party (DP) uses blue as its party colour rather than yellow.

=== Romania ===
In Romania the term of traffic light coalition has recently been described as a coalition consisting of Social Democratic Party (PSD), National Liberal Party (PNL) and the Hungarian Democratic Union of Romania (UDMR/RMDSZ). After political crisis of 2021 which resulted in the breakup of the center-right coalition between the PNL, the USR and the UDMR, a traffic light government was elected (also called the National Coalition for Romania) consisting of PSD, PNL and UDMR, Ciucă Cabinet.

As a result of the 2024 parliamentary election, the traffic light government formula between PSD, PNL and UMDR returned, this time under the Second Ciolacu Cabinet.

=== United Kingdom ===
In the United Kingdom the term has been used to describe a coalition between the Labour Party, the Liberal Democrats and the Green Party of England and Wales, notably that which has run the City of Lancaster district council from time to time, including from the 2019 election.

=== South Korea ===
For the April 2024 elections, the Justice Party and the Green Party announced the formation of an election alliance, the Green-Justice Party, and thus creating the start Korea's version of a left-wing traffic light coalition. The Labor Party announced in early 2025 that they would join the alliance, forming the full traffic light coalition. Since the impeachment of President Yoon Suk-yeol triggered a Presidential Election, the three progressive parties have announced that they will field a joint candidate.
