= Gerhard Mevissen =

German artist (born 1956)

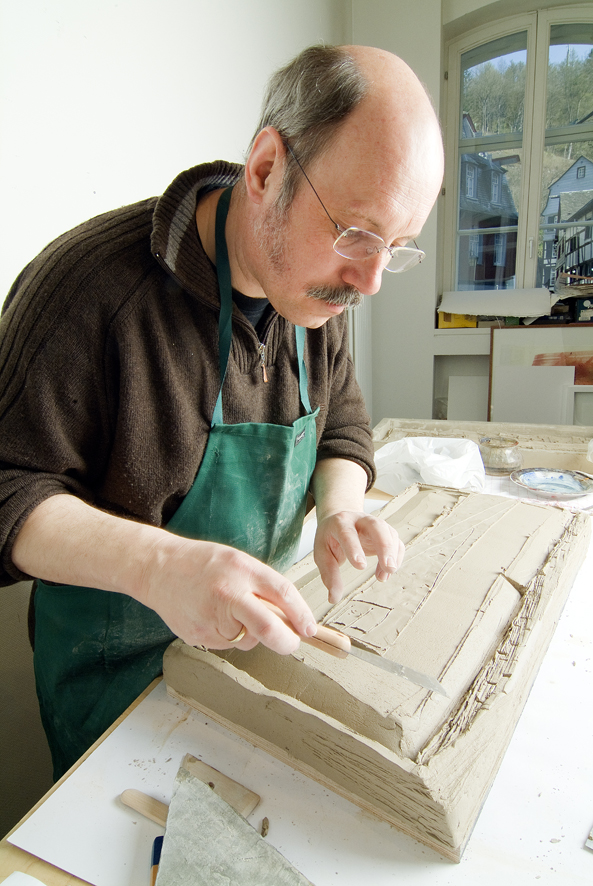
Gerhard Mevissen at work, 2008.

Gerhard Mevissen (born August 27, 1956) is a German artist whose main emphasis is on painting with watercolor and recently also the production of reliefs made of concrete.

== Life and career ==
Having studied theology in Bonn ( (Germany)) Gerhard Mevissen was trained in social pedagogy and art therapy. Since 1976 Mevissen has started to focus on drawing and water color painting; in 1978/79 he produced drawings during a six-month lasting stay in Madrid. Hereby, his devotion to art became even stronger so that in 1999 he became an autonomous artist.

== Awards ==
2001 Award of Arts by the German relief organization for blind people (Kunstpreis des Deutschen Blindenhilfswerks Duisburg)

== Exhibitions ==
- 2009
  - Lichtung Stillefeld II, Vernissage, Selfkant
  - Sommerausstellung International, office for cultural activities Bourg St. Andéol, France
  - Töne der Stille, Kontschthaus beim Engel, Luxembourg
  - Fünf Wunden, Bildsetzungen in 7 Kirchen, einer Kindertagesstätte u. dem St. Agatha-Krankenhaus, Cologne
- 2008
  - Bleibe im Treibenden, August-Pieper-Haus, Bischöfliche Akademie, Aachen
- 2007
  - Wat bleift?, Krypta der Basilika Belair, Luxembourg
  - Espace de Silence, Musek am Syrdal, Luxembourg Roodt-Syre
- 2002
  - Blindgänge Madrid-Berlin, Lehmbruck-Museum, Duisburg

== Books by Mevissen ==
In May 2007 Gerhard Mevissen published his first book "Stillespeicher" (ISBN 2959986792). It deals with his water color painting cycle "Stillespeicher".

In September 2009 his second book "Lichtung Stillefeld" was published. The book broaches the new concrete park called "Lichtung Stillefeld" in Höngen, Selfkant.

In March 2012 the book "Zurufe" (ISBN 978-99959-635-7-6) completed the trilogy.
