= Gustav Böhrnsen =

German politician (1914–1998)

Gustav Böhrnsen (24 January 1914 – 21 June 1998) was a German politician of the Social Democratic Party (SPD), who served as chairman of the SPD group in the Parliament of Bremen (the Bürgerschaft) from 1968 to 1971. He was elected to the Parliament of Bremen in 1955 and served as deputy chair of his party group (1966–1968), before being elected chair.

He was originally a member of the SPD, but in the 1930s, he became a member of the Socialist Workers' Party of Germany, the Young Communist League of Germany and the Communist Party of Germany. During the Nazi era, he was active in the anti-Nazi resistance, and was imprisoned from 1936 to 1939 as a political prisoner. In 1942, he was conscripted into the 999th Light Afrika Division, a penal military unit. He was taken prisoner of war by the Americans in 1943 and repatriated in 1946. After the war, he became a member of the SPD again and became active in the IG Metall union. He was elected chair of the works council of AG Weser, his employer, in 1951, and served in this capacity until 1979. The election of Böhrnsen, a social democrat, to this position, meant the communists were finally ousted from influence in the works council.

== Family ==
He is the father of SPD politician Jens Böhrnsen, who like his father, obtained the position as mayor of Bremen.

== Honours ==
A street in Bremen-Gröpelingen is named in his honour.
