= Henning Scherf =

German lawyer and politician

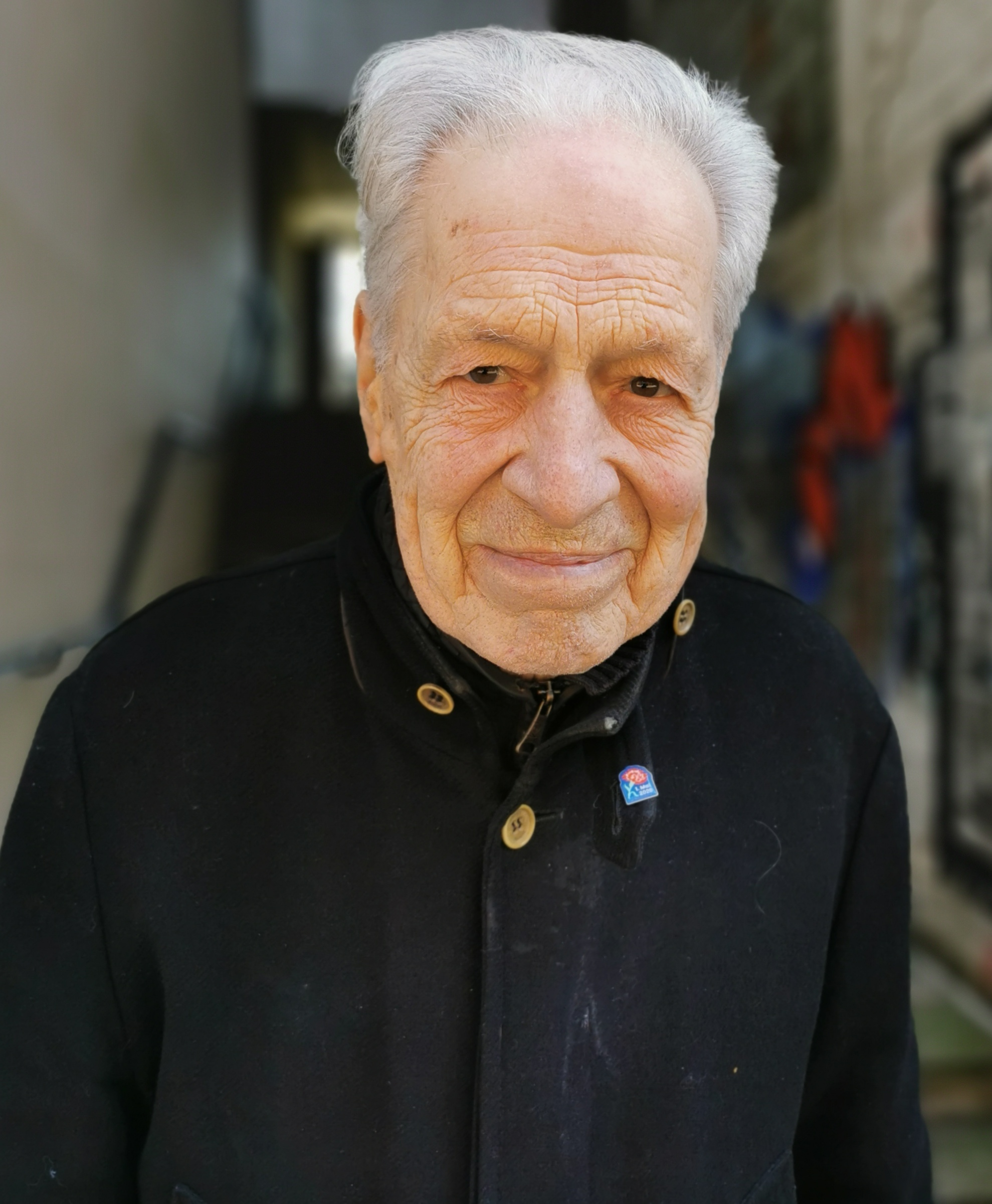
- Scherf (2026)

President of the Senate and Mayor of the Free Hanseatic City of Bremen
- In office 4 July 1995 – 8 November 2005
- Deputy: Ulrich Nölle; Hartmut Perschau; Peter Gloystein; Thomas Röwekamp
- Preceded by: Klaus Wedemeier
- Succeeded by: Jens Böhrnsen

Vice President of the Senate and Mayor of the Free Hanseatic City of Bremen
- In office 18 September 1985 – 11 December 1991
- President: Klaus Wedemeier
- Preceded by: Moritz Thape
- Succeeded by: Claus Jäger
Bremen Senator
Senator for Justice and the Constitution
In office 11 December 1991 – 8 November 2005
President	Klaus Wedemeier; himself
Deputy	Michael Göbel; Ulrich Mäurer
Preceded by	Volker Kröning
Succeeded by	Jens Böhrnsen
Senator for Education, Science and Arts
In office 6 February 1990 – 4 July 1995
President	Klaus Wedemeier
Deputy	Reinhard Hoffmann
Preceded by	Horst Werner Franke
Succeeded by	Bringfriede Kahrs
Senator for Health
Interim
In office 31 January 1987 – 26 January 1988
President	Klaus Wedemeier
Deputy	Friedrich Hennemann
Preceded by	Herbert Brückner
Succeeded by	Vera Rüdiger
Senator for Youth and Social Affairs
In office 7 November 1979 – 6 February 1990
President	Hans Koschnick; Klaus Wedemeier
Deputy	Hans-Christoph Hoppensack
Preceded by	Walter Franke
Succeeded by	Sabine Uhl
Senator for Finance
In office 27 September 1978 – 7 November 1979
President	Hans Koschnick
Deputy	Günter Stahl
Preceded by	Hans Stefan Seifriz (interim)
Succeeded by	Moritz Thape

Personal details
- Born: 31 October 1938 (age 87) Bremen, Free Hanseatic City of Bremen, Nazi Germany (now Germany)
- Party: Social Democratic Party (1963–)
- Spouse: Luise Scherf
- Children: 3
- Education: University of Freiburg; Free University of Berlin
- Occupation: Politician; Lawyer; Actor

Henning Scherf (born 31 October 1938) is a German lawyer and politician of the SPD party who served as President of the Senate and Mayor of Bremen from 4 July 1995 to 8 November 2005.

== Education ==
Scherf was born in Bremen. After studying law and social sciences from 1958 until 1962 in Berlin, Hamburg and Freiburg he worked for a Protestant students association (Evangelisches Studentenwerk) until 1964. In 1968 he received his law doctorate from University of Hamburg.

== Political career ==
Scherf has been a member of the Social Democratic Party of Germany since 1963.

Scherf went into politics after practicing as a lawyer in Bremen, and was elected to the Bremer Bürgerschaft (parliament) in 1971. From 1978 until 2005 he was a member of Bremen Senate (government) in various functions, including Senator for Finances, Senator for Youth and Social Issues, Senator for Health and Sport, Mayor, Senator for Education and Sciences and Senator of Law and Constitution. In 1995 Scherf was elected President of the Senate and Mayor of Bremen.

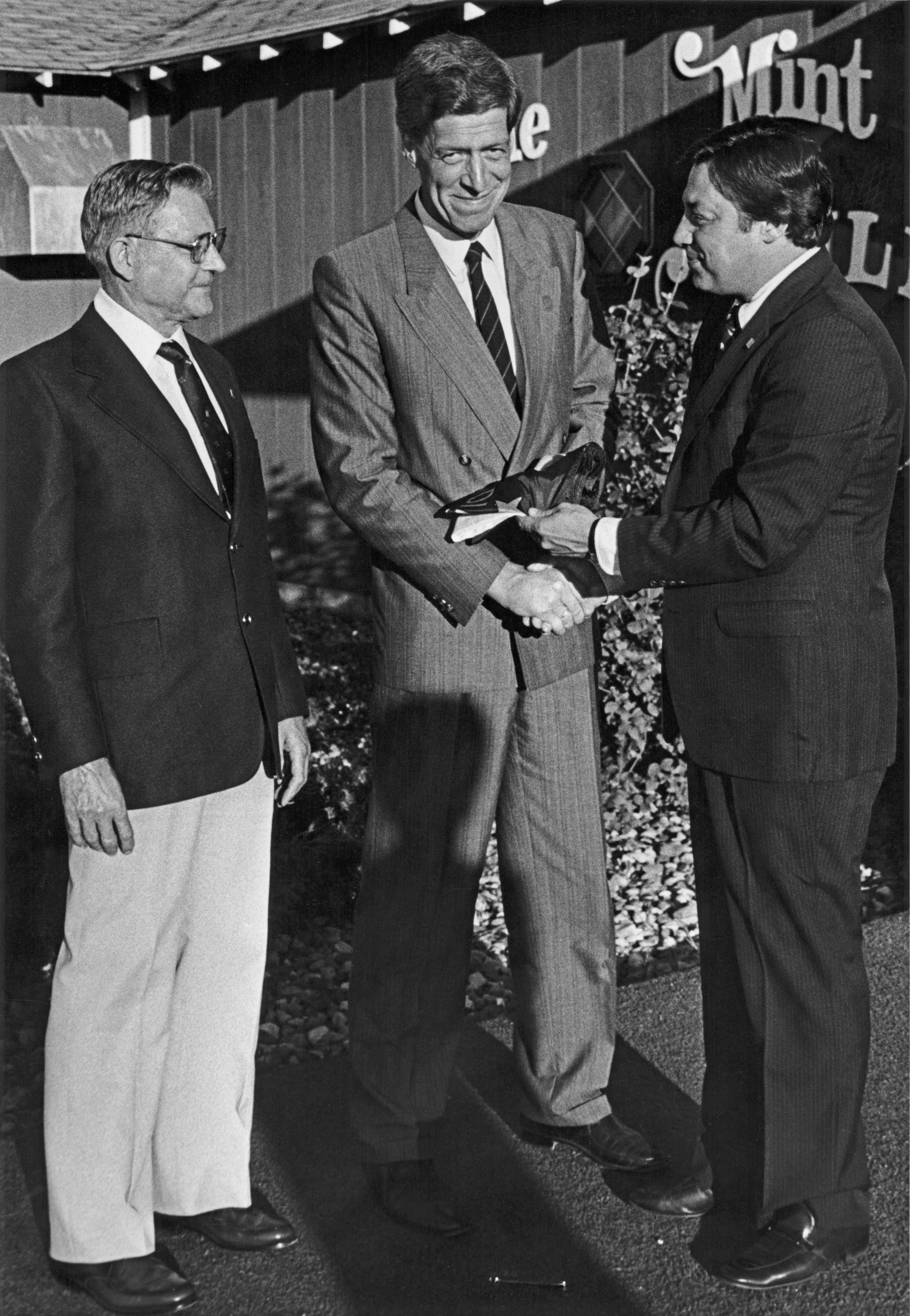
Scherf accepts an Indiana flag from members of the town council of Bremen, Indiana – 1986

He was also the head of the "Vermittlungsausschuss" (negotiations-committee) which resolves conflicts concerning legislation between "Bundesrat" and "Bundestag", the two houses of the German parliament at the federal level.

Scherf has been re-elected twice due to his popularity in Bremen. He is well known for his warm and friendly character despite his looks (he is 2 m tall). His diplomatic skills, especially in forging compromises and running negotiations, are considered legendary, not only by members of his own party.

For some time Scherf was urged by the people to run for the German Presidency (Bundespräsident) which he declined because of family reasons.

== Other activities ==
- Max Planck Institute for Demographic Research, Member of the Board of Trustees
- Gustav Heinemann Civic Award of the SPD, Chairman of the Board of Trustees

== Personal life ==
Henning Scherf married his wife Luise in 1960. The couple has three children and nine grandchildren.

He is well known for going to work by bicycle and refusing to accept a car and a driver provided by the city. He also has the habit of only drinking warm water with his meals.
