= Hartmut Perschau =

German politician (1942–2022)

Hartmut Perschau MEP
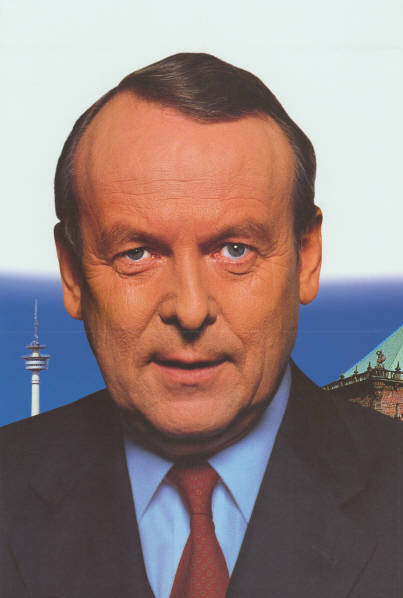
- Perschau in 1999

Member of the Hamburg Parliament
- In office 17 April 1974 – 2 October 1989

Member of the European Parliament for Germany
- In office 1989–1991

Personal details
- Born: Hartmut Jörg Heinz Perschauz; 28 March 1942 Danzig, Prussia, Germany
- Died: 25 July 2022 (aged 80) Bremen, Germany
- Political party: Christian Democratic Union of Germany
- Children: 2

Hartmut Jörg Heinz Perschau (28 March 1942 – 25 July 2022) was a German politician. He was a member of the Hamburg Parliament from 1974 to 1989, and a member of the European Parliament for Germany from 1989 to 1991.

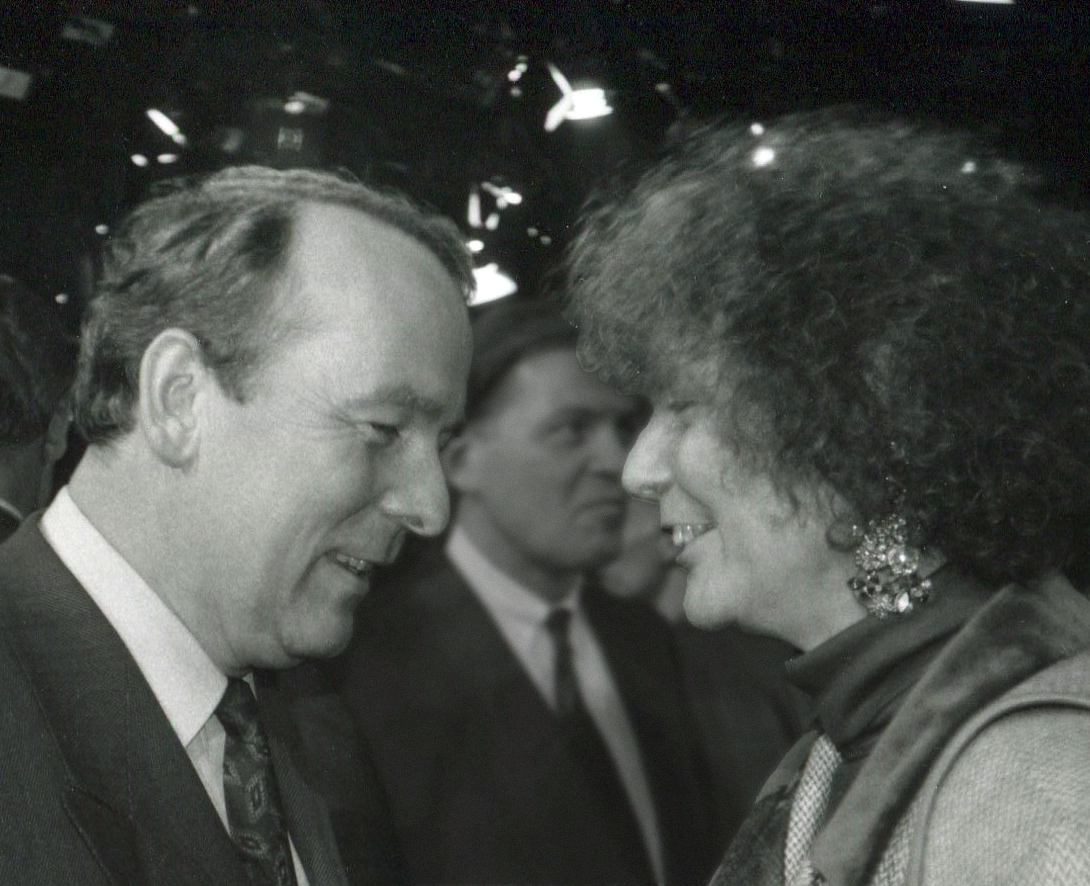
Perschau (left) with Christa Randzio-Plath in 1990

Perschau died in July 2022, at the age of 72.
