= Hans Koschnick =

German politician (1929–2016)

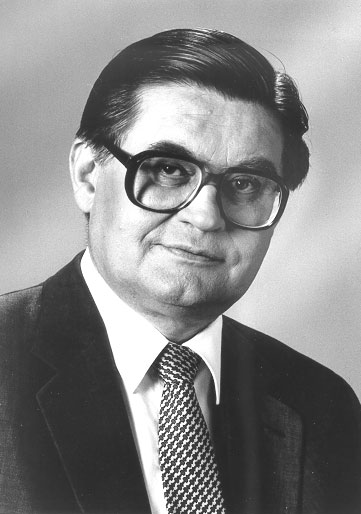
- Hans Koschnick

Mayor of Bremen
- In office 28 November 1967 – 17 September 1985
- Preceded by: Willy Dehnkamp
- Succeeded by: Klaus Wedemeier

President of the Bundesrat
- In office 1 November 1970 – 31 October 1971
- Preceded by: Franz-Josef Röder
- Succeeded by: Heinz Kühn
- In office 1 November 1981 – 31 October 1982
- Preceded by: Werner Zeyer
- Succeeded by: Johannes Rau

Personal details
- Born: 2 April 1929 Bremen, Weimar Republic (now Bremen, Germany)
- Died: 21 April 2016 (aged 87) Bremen, Germany
- Party: SPD
- Spouse: Christine Koschnick (m. 1954)
- Children: 1

Hans Koschnick (2 April 1929 – 21 April 2016) was a German politician (SPD) and elder statesman. He was the President of the Senate and Mayor of Bremen from 1967 to 1985, the President of the Bundesrat in 1970/71 and 1981/82, and afterwards served as a member of the Bundestag, the German federal parliament, from 1987 to 1998. Between 1994 and 1996, Koschnick was the EU administrator of Mostar.

== Biography ==
=== Early life ===
Koschnick grew up in the Gröpelingen neighborhood of Bremen. His childhood was shaped by his parents' activism. His father, who was a trade unionist and official of the Revolutionäre Gewerkschafts-Opposition, was arrested on the evening of 1 May 1933, the day before the Nazis stormed union offices all over Germany. He was charged with high treason for having organized a May Day rally and made a speech and was sent to a zuchthaus and then Sachsenhausen concentration camp, before being released "on leave" in 1938. In 1943, he was drafted into military service and the next year, sent to Finland.

His mother was arrested for acting as a courier between several German Resistance groups and spent one year. She refused to join the German Labour Front (DAF) and "learn" the Hitler greeting, causing her to frequently lose her job until she finally secured a position as a sugared goods sales clerk and was relatively removed from DAF spot checks. These interruptions were combined with constant absences, so Koschnick grew up with his grandparents.

=== Politics ===
He joined SPD in 1951 and became a member of Bremen state parliament in 1955.

On 26 November 1963, he was elected as Senator of Interior Affairs in the Senate under the leadership of Wilhelm Kaisen (SPD), successing Adolf Ehlers. After Kaisen's resignation, Koschnick was also Deputy President of the Senate and Mayor of the Senate of Willy Dehnkamp (SPD) from 20 July 1965.

After the new parliament elections, he became Mayor of the city Bremen and President of the Senate on 28 November 1967, i.e. head of government of the federal state of Bremen. During his reign, he was also Senator of Church Affairs from 1971 and Acting Senator for Economics and Foreign Trade in 1970 and Senator for Building for a few months in 1978 after the resignation of Senator Hans Stefan Seifriz (SPD).

In his reign, it fell among things like the Bremen tram riots in 1968, the founding of the Bremen university (1971), the town friendship between Bremen and Haifa, as the first town friendship of a German city with city in Israel (1978, both became twin towns in 1988), the swearing-in ceremony in Bremen in 1980 with violent riots, the Expansion of the Bremerhaven container terminal (1978-1983) and the Bremen freight traffic center in the 1980s, as well as the construction of a new Mercedes-Benz automobile plant in the district of Sebaldsbrück (1979-1982) for up to 18,000 employees.

From 1971 to 1972 and from 1981 to 1982 he was Prime Minister of Bremen and President of Federal Council. From 1983 to 1985, he was also a representative of the Federal Republic of Germany for cultural affairs within the framework of the Franco-German cooperation agreement.

From 1970 to 1991, Koschnick was a member of the federal execute committee of SPD and from 1975 to 1979 deputy SPD chairman and thus deputy to Willy Brandt. At that time, Koschnick pushed Ostpolitik forward and signed the first West German-Polish town twinning with Gdańsk on 12 April 1976.

After almost 18 years as Prime Minister and 22 years in the Senate, he resigned at his own request on 17 September 1985. His successor was Klaus Wedemeier, chairman of the SPD parliamentary group in Bremen.

=== Post-Senate politics ===
From 1987 to 1994, Koschnick was a member of the German Bundestag as a directly elected member of the Bremen-West constituency. He was deputy chairman of the foreign affairs committee, foreign policy spokesman a possible foreign minister in the early 1990s.

From 23 July 1993 to 2 April 1996, Koschnick was appointed by the European Union as EU Administrator of Mostar in Bosnia and Herzegovina, coordinating the reconstruction, administration and infrastructure of the war-torn city.

In 1994, Croatian nationalists attacked Koschnick with grenades, destroying his hotel room in Mostar but leaving him unharmed. A second attack in 1996 also failed. An angry Croatian crowd attacked Koschnick in his armored company car during a demonstration. The Croatian police remained passive. With the help of his escort and thanks to the armor protection of his limousine, he was able to escape unharmed.

In 1996, he declared his resignation from the EU Council of Foreign Ministers in Brussels a month after the 2nd assassination attempt after an emergency meeting of EU foreign ministers decided to make concessions to the Croat leadership responsible for the attack rather than support Koschnick's position.

He died on 21 April 2016 at his home in Bremen, at the age of 87.

== Honours ==
Although not well known in the rest of Germany, Hans Koschnick is held high regard in Bremen and Bremerhaven. A number of things were named in his honor:

- Prix France-Allemagne in Paris (1983)
- Honorary citizen of the Polish city Gdańsk (1994)
- Bremen medal of honor in Gold (1994)
- Kassel citizens price "The Glass of Reason" (1996)
- Hessian Peace Prize (1997)
- Honorary doctorate of the Haifa University (1997)
- Honorary citizen of the Hanseatic city of Bremen (1999)
- German-Polish Prize (2003)
- Honorary doctorate of the Bremen University (2004)
- Bremen Airport Hans Koschnick is named after him (2017)
- Bremen made a Bürgermeister-Koschnick-Platz (Mayor Koschnick Square) in Gröpelingen, a district in Bremen where he grew up (2023)

Political offices
Preceded by Willy Dehnkamp	Mayor of Bremen; 1967–1985	Succeeded by Klaus Wedemeier
