= Wolfgang Pfahl =

German politician (1947–2021)

Member of the Bürgerschaft of Bremen
- In office 31 October 1997 – 2007

Personal details
- Born: 23 June 1947 Bremerhaven, Allied-occupied Germany
- Died: 24 December 2021 (aged 74)
- Party: CDU

Wolfgang Pfahl (23 June 1947 – 24 December 2021) was a German politician. A member of the Christian Democratic Union of Germany, he served in the Bürgerschaft of Bremen from 1997 to 2007. Pfahl died on 24 December 2021, at the age of 74.
