= Klaus Wedemeier =

German politician

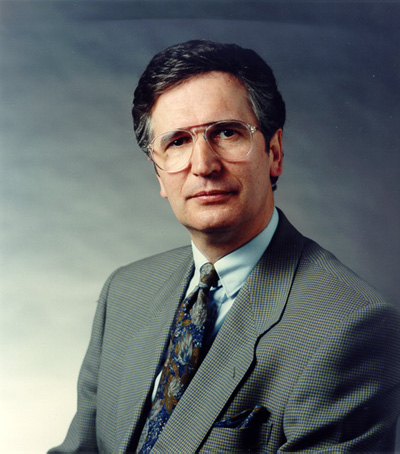
Klaus Wedemeier.

Klaus Wedemeier (born 12 January 1944 in Hof an der Saale) is a German politician (SPD) who served as the 5th President of the Senate and Mayor of Bremen from 1985 to 1995 and as the 47th President of the Bundesrat in 1993–94.

Political offices
Preceded by Hans Koschnick	Mayor of Bremen; 1985–1995	Succeeded by Henning Scherf
