= Peter Gloystein =

German banker

- Born: 25 November 1945 (age 80); Bremen, Germany
- Occupation(s): German banker, and Christian Democratic Union party politician.

Peter Gloystein (born 25 November 1945 in Bremen, Germany) is a German banker and Christian Democratic Union party politician. His banking career was mainly with Commerzbank and BHF-Bank in Frankfurt. From September 2004 until May 2005 he was the Lord Mayor and Senator for Economics and Harbours, as well as Senator for Culture in the Free Hanseatic City of Bremen, but he resigned following an incident in which he poured champagne over a homeless person. At present he works as a business consultant.

== Qualifications, profession, family ==
Gloystein was born in 1945 in Bremen, Germany. After leaving school he studied Business Management at the University of Hamburg achieving his PhD in 1977 with a thesis titled "The promotion of industrial restructuring by funding instruments of the European Community", which was later published as a book entitled "Financing of industrial restructuring through the EC".

From 1971 to 1975 he worked as scientific lecturer at the HWWA-Institut für Wirtschaftsforschung in Hamburg. Following this he moved on to investment banking at the WestLB in Düsseldorf (1975–1981). Gloystein then went on to work at the Commerzbank AG where he remained until 1999. First he was in charge of finance planning in the central department for Coordination and Planning in Frankfurt. In 1986 he moved on to be Head of the Stuttgart Branch. In 1990 he became deputy member of the board and one year later member of the board of the Commerzbank AG. In 1999 Gloystein moved on to become member of the board of the BHF-Bank and at the same time member of the Executive Committee Europe of the ING Group, Amsterdam. He became speaker of the board (CEO) of the BHF-Bank in 2000 in charge of controlling, credit-risk management, law, auditing and corporate communication. Gloystein resigned from the BHF and ING in 2002 as a result of differing opinions on future business strategy in the German market.

At the end of the 1990s, Gloystein was member of the board of the European Banking Association and the German Member of the Maas-Commission, which was formed by the European Commission for the technical preparation of the European Monetary Union.

In August 2004 the CDU nominated him as successor to Harmut Perschau, who had to resign due to health problems, and on 8 September 2004 he was voted in as the lord mayor and Senator for Economics and Harbours, as well as Senator for Culture in Bremen.

Gloystein is widowed with two children.

== Controversy ==
In Bremen Wine Week, on 12 May 2005, he poured a magnum of sparkling wine over a homeless man who was standing near the podium from which Mr Gloystein was speaking. Gloystein was described as laughing in the face of the crowd's boos and hisses. The homeless man burst into tears. Mr Gloystein later on offered compensation which was declined by the homeless man, responding that he is not going to be bribed. Mr Gloystein said that he had, in fact, intended to pour the wine into the man's mouth, but that he had turned away.

Mr Gloystein apparently later met the homeless man again and they parted "on friendly terms". Police confirmed that the homeless man was pressing charges against Gloystein for the incident. Mr Gloystein later resigned over the incident, following pressure from the media and opposition parties.

== Present activities ==
Gloystein has returned to business. He is a business consultant with focus on finance and cultural management, until 2008 in Bremen and since then in Düsseldorf. The consultancy business (M & A) was initially based on the function as advisory director of the Investment Bank Lincoln International, Frankfurt/Chicago, and from 2011 to 2022 as chairman of the supervisory board of the Deutsche Mergers & Acquitions AG, Düsseldorf, and from 2007 to 2016 as chairman of the supervisory board and till 2018 as chairman of the advisory board of the rating agency Scope. From 2018 until the beginning of 2022, Peter Gloystein worked in the project business with Fakt AG in Essen and the SUNfarming Group in Erkner near Berlin, up until 2023 he was a member of the advisory board of the private equity company Allistro Capital GmbH (Frankfurt) and since 2022 chairman of the supervisory board of the DAIDALOS Investment Advisors GmbH. In mid-2023, Peter Gloystein ended his activity as a management consultant; his only remaining commercial activity is the DAIDALOS mandate.

Peter Gloystein is also active in various cultural institutions and until 2022 he was chairman of the board of the association supporting the Cultural Project Hombroich, Neuss, and general manager of the Urban Planning Corporation Raumortlabor Hombroich gemeinnützige Stiftungs GmbH, Neuss. Currently he is chairman of the Friends Association of the Teatro La Fenice, Berlin, and member of the board of the Friends Association of the Deutsche Oper am Rhein, Düsseldorf/Duisburg. Until 2009 Gloystein was also active in the Friends Association of the Bayreuth Music Festival, first as longstanding member of the advisory board of the Friends Association and in 2009 as chairman of the executive board. He resigned from this position at the beginning of 2010. Since 2014 he has been chairman of the Board of Trustees of the Johanniter Hospital Bethesda in Mönchengladbach.

== Cultural engagements ==
- Honorary member of the Advisory Board of the for the Promotion of the Artistic and Cultural Center of Hombroich, Neuss
- Chairman of the management board of the Friends of the Teatro la Fenice e. V., Berlin
- Member of the Board of Trustees of Friends of the Deutsche Oper am Rhein Düsseldorf/Duisburg
- Co-sponsor of the Wagner Museum, Venice, Vice Chairman of the Board of Directors of the Fondazione Internazionale Richard Wagner di Venezia, Venice
