= List of mayors of Bremen =

The Free Hanseatic City of Bremen, which is one of the states of Germany, is governed by the Senate of the Free Hanseatic City of Bremen. The Senate is chaired by the president of the Senate, who is the head of government of the city-state. The president of the Senate and another member of the senate both hold the title mayor (Bürgermeister).

== List ==
=== Free Hanseatic City of Bremen (1945–present) ===
President of the Senate and Mayor of Bremen

Political party: SPD

Portrait	Name (Born–Died)	Term of office			Political party	Senate
Portrait	Name (Born–Died)	Took office	Left office	Days	Political party	Senate
1	Wilhelm Kaisen (1887–1979)	31 July 1945	20 July 1965	19 years, 354 days	SPD	I II III IV V VI VII
2	Willy Dehnkamp (1903–1985)	20 July 1965	28 November 1967	2 years, 141 days	SPD	I
3	Hans Koschnick (1929–2016)	28 November 1967	18 September 1985	17 years, 294 days	SPD	I II III VI V
4	Klaus Wedemeier (born 1944)	18 September 1985	4 July 1995	9 years, 289 days	SPD	I II III
5	Henning Scherf (born 1938)	4 July 1995	8 November 2005 resigned	10 years, 127 days	SPD	I II III
6	Jens Böhrnsen (born 1949)	8 November 2005	17 July 2015	9 years, 251 days	SPD	I II III
7	Carsten Sieling (born 1959)	17 July 2015	15 August 2019	4 years, 29 days	SPD	I
8	Andreas Bovenschulte (born 1965)	15 August 2019	Incumbent	7 years, 37 days	SPD	I II

Mayor, deputy of the president of the Senate

Name (Born–Died)	Took office	Left office	Party
Theodor Spitta (1873–1969)	6 June 1945	28 December 1955	Free Democratic Party
Jules Eberhard Noltenius (1908–1976)	28 December 1955	21 December 1959	Christian Democratic Union
Adolf Ehlers (1898–1978)	21 December 1959	26 November 1963	Social Democratic Party
Willy Dehnkamp (1903–1985)	26 November 1963	19 July 1965	Social Democratic Party
Hans Koschnick (1929–2016)	19 July 1965	22 November 1967	Social Democratic Party
Annemarie Mevissen (1914–2006)	22 November 1967	3 November 1975	Social Democratic Party
Walter Franke (1926–2015)	3 November 1975	7 November 1979	Social Democratic Party
Moritz Thape (1920–2019)	7 November 1979	17 September 1985	Social Democratic Party
Henning Scherf (born 1938)	17 September 1985	11 December 1991	Social Democratic Party
Claus Jäger (born 1943)	11 December 1991	2 November 1993	Free Democratic Party
Ralf Fücks (born 1951)	2 November 1993	23 February 1995	Alliance 90/The Greens
Ulrich Nölle (born 1940)	4 July 1995	16 September 1997	Christian Democratic Union
Hartmut Perschau (1942–2022)	16 September 1997	13 July 2004	Christian Democratic Union
Peter Gloystein (born 1945)	8 September 2004	12 May 2005	Christian Democratic Union
Thomas Röwekamp (born 1966)	25 May 2005	29 June 2007	Christian Democratic Union
Karoline Linnert (born 1958)	29 June 2007	15 August 2019	Alliance 90/The Greens
Maike Schaefer (born 1971)	15 August 2019	5 July 2023	Alliance 90/The Greens
Björn Fecker (born 1977)	5 July 2023	Incumbent	Alliance 90/The Greens

== See also ==
- Timeline of Bremen
