= Senate of Bremen =

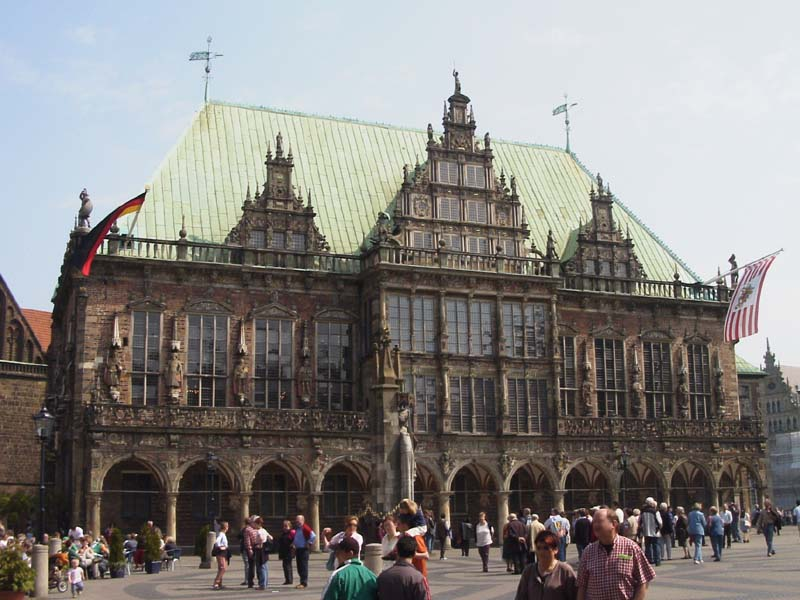
Bremen Town Hall, seat of the Senate of Bremen

The Senate of the Free Hanseatic City of Bremen (German: Senat der Freien Hansestadt Bremen) is the government of the German city-state Free Hanseatic City of Bremen. Various senate-like institutions have existed in Bremen since medieval times. The modern-day Senate is headed by a President, elected by the Parliament of Bremen, and the President's deputy, elected by the Senate. Both officials hold the title of Mayor. The position of President of the Senate corresponds to the position of Minister-President in most other states of Germany, while the senators are cabinet members similarly to ministers in other states.

From 2005 to 2015, Jens Böhrnsen served as President of the Senate and Mayor. In July 2015, Carsten Sieling became new President of the Senate and Mayor. Andreas Bovenschulte took over the position in 2019.

== See also ==
- List of mayors of Bremen
