= Uberman =

Uberman may refer to:

- Übermensch, Friedrich Nietzsche's Superman
- Uberman's sleep schedule, a polyphasic sleep cycle

== See also ==
- Oberman, a surname
- Obermann, a surname
- Ooberman, an English band
