= Peter Blachstein =

German journalist (1911–1977)

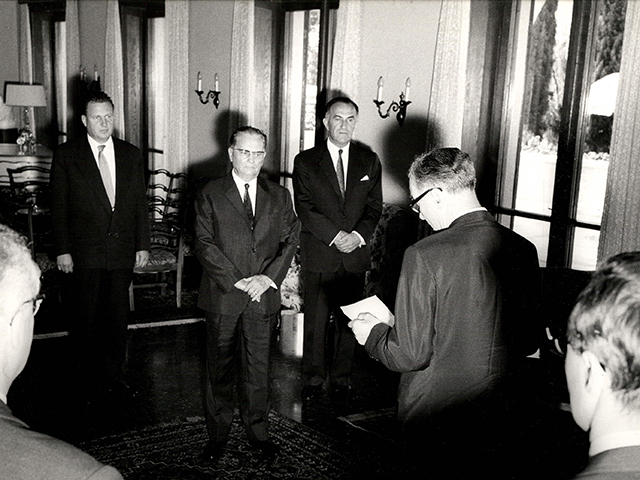
- Peter Blachstein meeting President of Yugoslavia Josip Broz Tito, 6 June 1968

Member of the Bundestag; from Hamburg
- In office 7 September 1949 – 31 May 1968
- Preceded by: Constituency established
- Succeeded by: Claus Arndt
- Constituency: Hamburg I (1949–1953); State list (1953–1957); Hamburg III (1957–1965); Eimsbüttel (1965–1968)

Personal details
- Born: 30 April 1911 Dresden, Germany
- Died: 4 October 1977 (aged 66) Hamburg, West Germany
- Party: Social Democratic

Peter Blachstein (30 April 1911 – 4 October 1977) was a German journalist and politician. During the middle 1930s he spent time in the Hohnstein Concentration Camp, but he was released and participated in the Spanish Civil War on the anti-fascist side. The rest of the Nazi years he spent outside Germany, mostly in Norway and Sweden. Following the restoration of diplomatic relations between West Germany and Yugoslavia, in 1968 he became West Germany's ambassador in Belgrade.

== Early life and education ==
Peter Blachstein was born in Dresden. His father, Max Blachstein, was a businessman who worked in the textiles sector. His mother, Gertrud Blachstein (born Gertrud Welsch), worked as a librarian. As he was growing up the family lived at George-Bähr-Straße 4, a city centre address. Between 1917 and 1929 Blachstein attended the local junior and secondary schools ("Volksschulle" & "Gymnasium") but, unusually with this type of school, he left without passing his school leaving exams ("Abitur"). Still in 1929, he embarked on a traineeship in the book trade, but quickly abandoned this. By now he had resolved to become a journalist. He applied for and obtained a special dispensation from the regional Ministry of Economics to enroll at the Technische Hochschule Dresden) despite never having completed his school exams. He studied here between 1929 and 1933, focusing on Economics and Germanistics, which included significant study of history and literature. He also found time to attend lectures at Dresden's theatre school: he was thereby a "guest student" with Erich Ponto (drama), Josef Gielen (theatre direction) and Fritz Busch (opera).

== Political career ==
=== Weimar Republic ===
While still at school he was a member of the German-Jewish Youth Association (" Deutsch-Jüdischen Jugendgemeinschaft " / DJJG) and of the German-Jewish Comradely Hikers League ("Kameraden, deutsch-jüdischer Wanderbund"). In 1931/32 he led the Dresden region DJJG group. In 1928 he had joined the Young Socialists, and in 1929 became a member of the Social Democratic Party ("Sozialdemokratische Partei Deutschlands" / SPD). As a student he financed his studies by working as a journalist. He was already writing for left of centre newspapers such as the Dresdner Volkszeitung, for Breslau's Sozialistische Arbeiterzeitung and for the young persons' newspaper, Junge Pioniere. His principal journalistic focus was on the arts and culture.

The early 1930s were years of surging political tensions. The German-Jewish Hiker League was dissolved in Easter 1932 as a consequence of increasing tensions between right-wing nationalists and socialist member. Later that year Blackstein joined the "Free German-Jewish Youth" ("Freie Deutsch-Jüdischen Jugend") group, which was concerning itself with educating Jewish youngsters on the merits of socialist approaches and attitudes. The political tensions of the times were also reflected inside the Social Democratic Party (SPD). Towards the end of 1931 Max Seydewitz was one of several SPD members expelled from the party for breaches of party discipline. Those excluded responded by setting up the Socialist Workers' Party ("Sozialistische Arbeiterpartei Deutschlands" / SAPD). Seydewitz was a local man, and Blachstein reacted by switching from the SPD to the new SAPD. In Dresden he established a youth wing for the SAPD. He was also entrusted with what was termed, in the spirit of the time, Agitprop work in the Dresden area, and it was in this context that he set up a political cabaret group called "Die Nebelspalter" (loosely "The fog destroyers") which campaigned for the SAPD in the two general elections of 1932. (The SAPD was not very successful electorally, however.) Although the focus of his journalistic work remained on the arts, he was also writing in support of the fight against the introduction of military sports ("Wehrsport") and of voluntary labour service ("Freiwilliger Arbeitsdienst") which the government was promoting as a remedy against the very high levels of unemployment which accompanied the economic depression that had been triggered by the Wall Street Crash back in 1929.

=== Nazi Germany ===
The political backdrop changed rapidly after the Nazi power seizure in January 1933. The new government lost very little time in transforming Germany from a democracy into a one-party dictatorship. Blachstein initially remained in Dresden as a member of the city's SAPD leadership group. His political activity was now illegal. Responding to an SAPD leafleting operation, between 1 May and 8 May 1933 approximately 90 SAPD activists were arrested. Peter Blachstein was one of them. He was taken to Dresden Jail where his interrogation involved serious physical torture. On 28 February 1934 he was transferred from Dresden Jail to Hohenstein Concentration Camp, where he remained until August 1934. Later he would use his experience from the inside of the Nazi prison system in a theater play "Ein Prozeß" ("A trial"), published and first performed in Oslo in 1938.

The old president's death, in August 1934, was marked by a fourth so-called Hindenburg Amnesty. Blachstein was among those released. However, he was forbidden to work and, after returning to Dresden where he now lived with his parents, he was kept under police surveillance. He remained keen to continue with his political activity, but this was not a realistic option as long as he remained in Dresden. At the end of 1934 he had a meeting with the national leader of the SAPD leader, Walter Fabian (still sometimes in Germany, but now "underground"). Fabian's advice was that if he could find no way of working in Germany he should go abroad. Blachstein was at an increased risk of arrest as long as he remained in Germany because his Jewish provenance was a matter of public record. In January 1935 he fled to Czechoslovakia, where by now Fabian himself was based. He remained in contact with the SAPD leadership, from whom he received an instruction, in July 1935, to relocate again, this time travelling via Gdingen and Copenhagen to Oslo, Norway.

=== Exile ===
He arrived in Oslo in August 1935. He was given a post as a secretary with the "International Bureau of Revolutionary Youth Organisations" ("Internationalen Büro revolutionärer Jugendorganisationen" / IBRJ), a combined grouping that linked member organisations of the "Socialist Youth International", and essentially, for many purposes, an exiled continuation of the Socialist Youth League of Germany ("Sozialistischer Jugend-Verband Deutschlands" / SJV). The IBRJ operated under the auspices of what was known, at this time, as the "London Büro". The Oslo affiliate was led by Willy Brandt, with whom Peter Blachstein was able to build a relationship of mutual trust. The two men worked closely together. One of Blachstein's principal jobs involved producing the International Youth Bulletin ("Internationalen Jugend Bulletin""). He was also entrusted with organising and implementing a theoretical training programme for the IBRJ, designed to help create a united front against fascism. It was only several years later, after Stalin's political purges and his own more personal experiences of Stalinist communism in action during his time in Spain, that Blachstein would become implacably opposed to any sort of political alliance with the communists.

In the summer of 1936 Blachstein travelled to Paris, by now a principal centre for exiled left-wing German politicians. Here he met up, again, with Walter Fabian. He also went to Brussels where he took part in an international worker's congress of opposition to war. The war that preoccupied the congress was the Spanish Civil War which had erupted suddenly in the middle of July 1936. During the course of the congress it was determined that the Oslo IBRJ office should relocate to Barcelona. This was the context in which, in November 1936, as the Oslo IBRJ secretary, Peter Blachstein moved to Barcelona.

=== Spanish Civil War ===
In Barcelona he joined the Spanish Republican Army and the POUM ("Partido Obrero de Unificación Marxista" - a Spanish Communist Party). He became a member of the executive committee of the POUM and also served a leading role in producing propaganda for the POUM and for the exiled SAPD. His was given the rank of lieutenant in a "shock battalion", but sources indicate that he was kept away from the actual fighting.

Inside the SAPD, the first part of 1937 saw an intensification of differences over attitudes to a possible political party of the united left or a Popular front, and more precisely over the party's approach to the Soviet Union. The differences led to Peter Blachstein's exclusion from the SAPD. Others excluded at the same time included his political mentor Walter Fabian and Erwin Ackerknecht: the three became the focus of a short-lived political grouping known as "Neuer Weg" ("New Way"). Blachstein was also affected more directly by the intense political tensions radiating out from Moscow, based on Stalin's suspicions - not entirely unfounded - that there might be comrades in the Soviet Union and further west in Europe who favoured an alternative Soviet leader. The POUM, of which Blachstein was a member, backed a broadly Trotskyist vision for a communist future and its members therefore became targets for Soviet agents. In June 1937 Blachstein was arrested in Barcelona by communist secret police and accused of spying for Franco and working for the Gestapo. With approximately 100 other foreign detainees he was taken to a large garage which had been adapted for use as an ad hoc prison. Because of the appalling hygiene he soon fell ill with Tuberculosis, as a result of which he was transferred to a sanatorium controlled by anarchist comrades. Helped by Spanish friends, in January 1938 he succeeded in escaping back to France.

=== Return to Scandinavia ===
On labour camps:

It is not annihilation through work that defined the Nazi Concentration Camp system, but work without regard for annihilation. That was absent from the Soviet labour camps which lacked the cruelty and deathly fury that characterised the SS-camps where the very purpose of the place was destruction and extermination

Es ist nicht Vernichtung durch Arbeit, was das Kennwort des KZ-Systems war, sondern ‚Arbeit ohne Rücksicht auf Vernichtung'. Deshalb fehlt dem russischen System auch der Zug der absichtlichen Grausamkeit und der Tötungswut, die den SS-Lagern charakteristisch war und die nur durch den Vernichtungs- und Ausrottungszweck erklärbar sind.

-- Peter Blachstein 1948

In France he met up with Walter Fabian and started working for Fabian's newspaper department. However, short of money and still in poor health, he quickly decided he would be better advised to return to Oslo. After a period recovering from an operation in connection with his Tuberculosis, he started working in the secretariat of the International Labour Front Against War which had been jointly created in September 1938 by the (Dutch) Revolutionary Socialist Party, the (British) Independent Labour Party, the (Spanish) POUM and the (exiled German) "Neuer Weg" group. The new organisation's purpose was to gather and disseminate information about the Spanish Civil War.

In the April 1940 Norway was over-run by German troops. Blackstein fled to Sweden where he was initially interned for several months, before being given permission to live in Uppsala. In his Swedish exile he found time to refresh his college studies, revisiting topics in Economics, History and Literature. He also found work as a journalist. Along with that he was able to stage several plays by Danish authors. Working with an Uppsala University student theatre group he was deeply involved in the translation and production of several plays by Bertolt Brecht. On top of that, in 1943 he was employed by the Racial Biology Institute at Uppsala University as a lecturer and archivist. On the political front he was also an active member of the Swedish-based group of German trades unionists (" Landesgruppe Schweden der Auslandsvertretung der deutschen Gewerkschaften (LDG)"). Within the LDG he opposed the mainstream view, manifesting a certain mistrust of the motives of the allied powers. He was also uncompromising in his opposition to any whisper of a united front between communist elements and social democratic elements in the LDG.

War ended, formally, in May 1945. Blachstein remained in Sweden until the early summer of 1947, working in Stockholm as secretary to the International Rescue and Relief Committee (IRRC). A central part of his work involved organising the sending of food parcels to Germany. (He continued to work for the IRRC even after his return to Germany.)

=== New beginnings ===
In February 1945, a large part of Dresden had been destroyed, and after May 1945 his home city was part of a large chunk of what had been central Germany that found itself administered as the Soviet occupation zone. When he returned to occupied Germany on 6 or 27 May 1947 he settled not in Dresden but in Hamburg, at that time administered as part of the British occupation zone. This meant that after 1949, when the occupation zones were relaunched as the US Sponsored German Federal Republic (West Germany) and the Soviet sponsored German Democratic Republic (East Germany), Peter Blechstein was based in "capitalist" West Germany. In the western occupation zones a return to a multi-party political structure was being implemented, and Blachstein joined the Social Democratic Party ("Sozialdemokratische Partei Deutschlands" / SPD), while supporting himself successfully as a free-lance journalist.

He soon obtained a post with the Hamburger Echo as Feuilleton editor. Shortly after this he was elected to chair the local Hamburg-Eimsbüttel SPD. He continued to serve as a member of the regional party executive between 1948 and 1976. He also had an ambition to become involved in national politics, and in 1949 stood successfully for election to the Bundestag. He remained a member for nearly two decades, until October 1968. Between 1954 and 1968 he was a member of the party leadership team in the assembly, and increasingly focused on foreign policy issues, serving as the Home Affairs and Foreign Policy committees. He was a member of the Inter-Parliamentary Union and of the advisory council to the Western European Union. In terms of political philosophy he remained on the left wing of the party and was accordingly critical of the Godesberg Program, although his criticism was more rigorously analytical than politically beguiling, and his approach failed to generate widespread support.

Between 1955 and 1968, he was a member of the administrative council of the broadcaster Norddeutscher Rundfunk. He also took a particular concern in refugees, founding the German Committee for Spanish Refugees in 1958.

== Later life ==
In May 1968 Blachstein resigned from the Bundestag in order to take up an appointment as West Germany's ambassador to Yugoslavia. In June 1969 poor health forced him to retire from the position, however.

After a period of recuperation his health improved, and between 1970 and 1972 he found himself working directly for Willy Brandt, employed as an officer of the Government Press Service. After this, until his death of 4 October 1977, he again worked as a free-lance journalist.

== Personal life ==
Peter Blachstein seldom mentioned his family in public, or even privately with friends. He had a brother and a younger sister. Blachstein himself was a committed atheist who could never understand how a national government could simply decide who was Jewish and who was not: he robustly rejected the conflation of race and religion. He came from a humanist background. However, the German government under Adolf Hitler took a different view, and the identification of his family as Jewish placed them at increased risk when Nazi antisemitism became an underpinning of government policy. Blachstein's parents spotted the dangers in good time, and while Peter Blachstein remained in Europe his parents and his two siblings emigrated to the United States. From here they successfully rescued at least some of their assets from Germany, which a couple of years later would have been impossible. In the 1950s Blachstein began making regular visits across the Atlantic to see his family. His sister pursued a successful career as an academic. His brother took over the delicatessen that their parents had started. The brothers were not on particularly good terms: Peter Blachstein nevertheless liked to serve his friends "Blachstein delicacies" from the family shop, which he had brought back from his latest American trip ("Blachstein Gewürze, alle mitgebracht aus Amerika").

Peter Blachstein never married. His fiancée was killed, in barbaric circumstances under the Nazi regime.

== See also ==
- Germany–Yugoslavia relations
