= Enderle =

Enderle is a German surname.

Notable people with this surname include:

- August Enderle (1887–1959), German politician
- Dick Enderle (1947–2008), American football player
- Irmgard Enderle (1895–1985), German politician
- Nathan Enderle (born 1988), American football player
- Sebastian Enderle (born 1989), German footballer
