= Sozialistischer Schutzbund (Germany) =

Sozialistischer Schutzbund ('Socialist Protection League', abbreviated SSB) was a paramilitary formation in Weimar Germany, linked to the Socialist Workers' Party of Germany (SAPD). SSB was active between 1931 and 1933. The organization mainly acted as guards at election campaign meetings. SSB also guarded offices of the party and the Socialist Youth League of Germany. The SSB wore a uniform with blue shirts, red armbands and dark blue caps. SSB earned a degree of respect for its discipline.

SSB was formed by members of the Reichsbanner Schwarz-Rot-Gold. At the time of the founding of the organization, the SSB had some 100 members. SSB made its first public appearance in Zwickau on 8 November 1931. Some 500 SSB members paraded through the city. On 6 December 1931 a SSB march with 500 participants took place.

In 1932 the Communist Party of Germany (Opposition) (KPD(O)) dissident Karl Borromäus Frank joined SAPD, and was appointed as the national chief of SSB. Frank was expelled from the party later the same year.
