= Ledebour =

Ledebour is a surname. Notable people with the surname include:

- Carl Friedrich von Ledebour (1786–1851), German-Estonian botanist
- Georg Ledebour (1850–1947), German journalist and politician
