= Council for a Democratic Germany =

US-based, Germany-focused political organization

The Council for a Democratic Germany (CDG) was founded on 3 May 1944 in New York City. Its founding was a reaction to the founding of the National Committee for a Free Germany in Moscow in July 1943. Some of the founding members brought experiences of previous similar organizations with them, such as the Lutetia-Kreis. The Council saw itself as representing all German people. Its membership included socialists, social democrats, communists, middle-class democrats, former members of the Centre Party, writers, artists, and scientists. This gathering of exiles was to serve as a platform for opinion-shaping and exerting political influence. The chairman was Paul Tillich, a Protestant theologian at the Union Theological Seminary in New York. He gave the Council its specific political-theological shape. No other exile organization brought together a similarly wide spectrum of figures in politics and the arts.

== Work ==
The CDG commented on current events of the war and political developments. One example is the "Declaration of the Council for a Democratic Germany after the Allied invasion in Normandy on 6 June 1944". In different committees, detailed plans for the reconstruction of society after the war were discussed.

On the whole, it must be said that international developments did not conform to the CDG's declaration.

It called for:

1. A right of national self-determination, also for Germany
2. Cooperation between the Western powers and Russia, for which the intellectual groundwork had been prepared through the cooperation in the CDG between bourgeois and communist figures

The international developments that went against the CDG's plans were:

1. The Allied demand for German unconditional surrender meant that, for the foreseeable future, national self-determination would not apply to Germany
2. The increasing distance and hostility between the Western Allies and the Soviet Union, which developed into the Cold War

Unresolvable differences between bourgeois and left-wing members over the Potsdam Agreement and its political and economic consequences signalled the end of the CDG in autumn 1945. It was never formally dissolved.

The section of the memorandum discussing health policy was largely written by Käte Frankenthal, Felix Boenheim, and Kurt Glaser

== Founding members ==
The 19 members of the founding committee were:

- Paul Tillich, Siegfried Aufhäuser (SPD)
- Horst W. Baerensprung (Social Democrat)
- Friedrich Baerwald (Centre Party)
- Felix Boenheim (Communist Party of Germany)
- Bertolt Brecht (writer)
- Hermann Budzislawski (Socialist)
- Frederik J. Forell (Confessing Church)
- Kurt Gläser (Revolutionäre Sozialisten Deutschlands)
- Albert Grzesinski (SPD)
- Karl Frank (Neu Beginnen)
- Paul Hertz (SPD)
- Hans Emil Hirschfeld (Social Democrat)
- Joseph Kaskell (Deutsche Blätter (a German exile newspaper))
- Julius Lips (left-wing Social Democrat)
- Alfons A. Nehring (linguist)
- Otto Pfeiffenberger (lawyer)
- Albert Schreiner (Communist Party of Germany)
- Jacob Walcher (Socialist Workers' Party of Germany)

Elisabeth Hauptmann functioned as "Executive secretary".

Thomas Mann had been involved in the plans for the CDG, but did not become a member. Although he agreed with large parts of the declaration, he felt its publication was too early. He also felt that the CDG should adopt a more critical approach to their home country, and to the crimes committed by Germans.
