= Stefan Szende =

Hungaro-Swedish political scientist, politician, journalist and writer

- Born: István Szende; 10 April 1901; Szombathely, Vas, Austria-Hungary
- Died: 5 May 1985 (aged 84)
- Occupations: political scientist politician journalist writer high-profile concentration camp survivor
- Political party: KMP; KPDO; SAPD; SPD
- Spouse: Elisabeth "Erszi" Csillag (1901–1997)
- Children: Barbara Cecilia Szende/Baron
- Parent(s): Max (1872–1921) & Elisabeth (1874–1944) Szende

Stefan Szende (born István Szende: 10 April 1901 – 5 May 1985) was a Hungaro-Swedish political scientist, politician, journalist and writer who during the Nazi years became an anti-fascist resistance fighter and a victim of the concentration camp system.

== Life ==
=== Hungarian provenance and early years ===
István Szende was born in Szombathely, then on the western edge of the Hungarian part of Austria-Hungary. Max Szende (1872–1921), his father, was an insurance company worker. With his elder brother László, István grew up in a prosperous liberal-Jewish family and acquired a sold classical education, largely free of Jewish religious elements. He attended school locally, moving on to a Roman Catholic secondary school. Szombathely was a multi-cultural city. His mother Elisabeth (1874–1944), who came from a German-speaking family, ensured that he grew up fluently bilingual, and he also learned a third language, French, to a high standard at school.

He later wrote that it was as a result of observing the material hardship of his own family's domestic servants, of reading the works of writers such as Émile Zola and Friedrich Nietzsche, and of the senseless carnage of the First World War battlefields that his political awareness was triggered while he was still at school. On leaving school he took a job as a bank clerk, but he soon abandoned this. Later in 1919 he both joined the Hungarian Communist Party and enrolled at the University of Vienna in order to study Philosophy, a career ambition which implied another decade of scholarship. It was around this time that he came under the influence of the Hungarian left-wing philosopher György Lukács.

=== Vienna and Budapest ===
In the end, he stayed at Vienna University only till 1921, which was the year in which his father died. He returned to Hungary, which in 1918 had become a separate country. He did not return to Szombathely, however, but relocated to Budapest where his brother László, now a newly qualified architect, was living. Still aged only 20, he enrolled at the university, studying Law and Political sciences. By now he was finding publishers for book reviews and short essays. He also intensified his contacts with political intellectuals. After a brief period of radical and communist government, the new Hungarian state had become conservative and authoritarian which made open support for communism dangerous. Szende moved in socialist left-wing circles in which membership of the Social Democratic Party provided a mantle of acceptability for his continuing interest in Marxist philosophy, an area in which by now he was also lecturing.

He concluded his studies in 1924 and received his doctorate from Budapest University in 1925. By this time it seems that he was devoting more time to political activity. In 1926 he was arrested and accused of having "insulted the Minister for Justice" in an article he had written. On a second occasion, he was arrested for "inciting class hatred" in a lecture delivered to members of the Metal Workers' Trades Union, and accused of "insulting the national honour" in another article. Facing the prospect of a trial and a longer jail term, when he was released from investigative detention in 1928 he fled the country, emigrating a second time to Vienna. By this time his widowed mother and brother had distanced themselves from his political activity, and while they remained in Hungary, Stefan Szende, now in enforced exile, was stripped of his Hungarian nationality. He would remain legally stateless for the next twenty-two years. Supported by the Soviet sponsored International Red Aid workers' welfare organisation, he found his Viennese home, initially, in a refugee camp.

He met another Jewish refugee from Hungary at the refugee camp. Elisabeth "Erszi" Csillag (1901–1997) was an opera singer by training. The two of them married in 1929 and moved into a two-room city apartment, still receiving some financial support from International Red Aid, supplemented by occasional payments for published articles. Szende also resumed his academic career, returning to the study of philosophy. It was probably in 1930 that he received his second doctorate, this time from the University of Vienna.

Despite the Austrian doctorate, life in Vienna remained precarious. At the end of 1929, he was excluded from the Communist Party in the context of internal party splits that echoed political rivalries in Moscow that centred round Stalin. Exclusion from the party meant the loss of most of his social contacts, many friends, and separation from what he regarded as his natural political home. On a more practical level, once he had concluded his studies the authorities would no longer extend his residence permit. He, therefore, decided to move again, this time to Berlin. Initially, he was not accompanied by Erszi who was by now pregnant, and who returned to Hungary where she stayed with her mother. Accordingly, while Stefan Szende was trying to become established in Berlin, on 26 November 1930 the couple's daughter, Barbara Cecilia, who later became a physician, was born in Budapest.

=== Berlin ===
In Berlin Szende rented a small room on the south side of the city centre (Hallesches Tor). He was short of money and hungry. His expulsion the previous year from the Communist Party meant there was no instant network of supportive comrades. In the end it was through his wife, still in Budapest, that he gained an entry into the socialist milieu through an old friend from Yugoslavia who was living in Berlin. He was introduced to Kostja Zetkin whose mother, Clara Zetkin, despite having herself been recently been excluded from the Communist Party, was already an iconic figure for the German left. On Clara Zetkin's recommendation he joined the newly formed Communist Party of Germany - Opposition (" Kommunistische Partei Deutschlands" / KPO), an alternative Communist Party set up by some of those excluded by the increasingly hardline Communist Party of Germany. He was not hugely active within the PO, but he nevertheless later recalled that his time in it had provided a welcome release from the "social fascism precepts" ("Sozialfaschismusthese") characteristic of the mainstream communist parties as politics became more polarised. Through the KPO he was also able to gain an extensive knowledge of the German labour movement and a deep understanding of the political currents of the time. This provided a sound basis for his own future political development and helped him read the unfolding political situation as it evolved through the 1930s.

In 1932 the KPO itself split apart. Stefan Szende, along with Jacob Walcher, Paul Frölich and August Enderle, was among approximately 1,000 members who transferred from the KPO to the new Socialist Workers' Party ("Sozialistische Arbeiterpartei Deutschlands" / SAPD). The SAPD originated as a desperate move to unite the political left in order to confront and block the seemingly unstoppable advance of populist nationalism represented by the National Socialist German Workers' Party ("Nationalsozialistische Deutsche Arbeiterpartei" / Nazi Party). Szende got to know the SAPD leader, Max Köhler, after which he became far more politically active in the SAPD than he had been in the KPO. One young member of the SAPD was Herbert Karl Frahm, later known as Willy Brandt, who would write of Szende's strong intellectual and spiritual leadership within the party's Berlin group ("[er hat] ... eine geistig führende Rolle in unserer Berliner Gruppe gespielt"").

=== Nazi Germany ===
The Nazi take-over at the start of 1933 completely changed the political backdrop, and after the Reichstag fire at the end of February 1933 the new government accelerated the transformation of Germany into a one-party dictatorship. Having already anticipated that the period of Nazi government would be no passing trend, but a sustained and long-term threat, the SAPD was in many ways better prepared to transform itself into an underground movement than the larger Communist Party and SPD. Szende was quick to respond to the challenge of sustaining party political work under conditions of illegality. His choice of a party cover name, "Stefan", nevertheless indicates a certain naivete in aspects of his approach. In August 1933 the Gestapo broke the national leadership of the SAPD, which included the arrest of the party's Berlin region leader, Max Köhler. Stefan Szende now took over the party leadership in Berlin.

He himself was arrested by the Gestapo on 22 November 1933. As a survivor, he was later able to write about his experiences during the ensuing months in considerable detail. Other SAPD party activists were arrested at the same time. Since Szende was both the leader, for Berlin, of the illegal SAPD and a foreign stateless Jew, he was in particular danger from the sinister fantastical obsessions of his captors.Those arrested were taken to the "Maikowski House", a former trades union building in Berlin-Charlottenburg which had been taken over as a head office by local Nazi para-militaries (SA). His interrogators included Karl Ernst and Prince August Wilhelm, a younger son of the former Kaiser. During the next few weeks Szende was repeatedly interrogated and badly tortured, but the torturers, for reasons of their own, took care to see to it that he did not actually die. He was repeatedly asked about his part in the international Jewish-Bolshevik conspiracy in which the interrogators insisted he was involved. They also repeatedly asked him about his connections with Leon Trotsky who at this stage was evidently demonised by the followers of Hitler just as thoroughly as by the followers of Stalin.

On 1 December 1933 the SAPD prisoners were transferred to the "Columbia House" concentration camp at Berlin-Tempelhof where nightly torture sessions by the SS guards were part of the routine. For interrogation sessions, Szende was taken to the Gestapo main office at Prince Albrecht Street 8 where his lead interrogator, Commissar von Plotho, had special responsibility for investigating the SAPD members. Szende was again identified as a Jewish intellectual foreigner and as a socialist, which meant he was singled out for special persecution back in the "Columbia House" concentration camp. By this time he was suffering not merely from the daily beatings at the concentration camp, but also from the long term injuries to his genitals, which were treated cruelly and painfully with Silver nitrite by a doctor who was entirely open in sharing his conviction that his patient was a member of the International Jewish Conspiracy.

Christmas 1933 and the new year holiday passed largely unremarked, but on 5 January 1934 the prisoners were moved again, now to the newly opened Oranienburg concentration camp a short distance to the north of the city. Szende's description of their welcome at Oranienburg closely mirrors the experiences of others: it involved verbal abuse and beating along with more "refined torture scenes" in the showers. Most internees were allowed periods of rest, but Jews were singled out for a more relentless routine. On his first day at the camp Szende was taken to the infamous "Room 16" where he had his first encounter with Obersturmführer Hans Stahlkopf, who held a position of responsibility at the Oranienburg concentration camp.

His wife also found out about his transfer to Oranienburg. She had, by this time, relocated from Budapest to Berlin, though it is not clear whether she was accompanied by their three-year-old daughter, or whether the child had been left with her grandmother in Budapest. The day after Szende's transfer to Oranienburg, Erszi wrote a letter to the Hungarian consul in Berlin, pleading for help in arranging permission for her to visit her husband whom she probably had not seen since his arrest the previous autumn. The application was successful and she was permitted a visit to the concentration camp.

Daily life in the camp began with work allocation. With Max Fürst and another Jewish inmate, Szende was in the first instance placed on bathhouse duty, which was considered a "dirty" job allocated to Jewish inmates. Szende did not consider it a dirty job, at least when compared to cleaning the toilets which was the other related "dirty" job allocated to Jewish detainees. Bathhouse duty involved half an hour transporting hot water for the baths of prisoners and their guards which was physically strenuous but did allow for a human level of contact with the guards, including one young SA guard who recognised Szende. Even when he was (relatively) fortunate in the work allocated to him, Szende nevertheless suffered the same discrimination as other Jewish detainees. All the inmates slept in a single barrack-dormitory, but the Jews were separated out and grouped together. From the middle of January 1934 the Jewish inmates were all required to wear a Star of David armband, something which later the Nazis also introduced outside the concentration camp. Szende slept next to the well-known anarchist Erich Mühsam: during daylight hours the two men played chess together and exchanged political insights on Marxism–Leninism. Szende noticed that Mühsam, like him, underwent more visits to "Room 16" for interrogation-torture sessions than the other Jewish internees. (Erich Mühsam was murdered at the Oranienburg concentration camp in July 1934.}

In several of his subsequent published writings, Stefan Szende describes in considerable detail the extreme sadistic pleasure taken by Obersturmführer Hans Stahlkopf in the regular torture sessions. In some of the other concentration camp guards and administrators it was occasionally possible to detect glimpses of humanity beyond the inhuman cruelty, but Stahlkopf was driven by a passionate antisemitism and took an unconfined delight in inflicting physical pain.

In February 1934, after more than a month in Oranienburg, Szende and other inmates were fastened into so-called "Stehbunker", which were wooden containers with a footprint of approximately two feet by two feet, into which victims were placed and confined so that they could neither sit nor crouch. The devices were placed in the cellar, and inmates were obliged to remain standing in them. Szende was placed in one for four days and nights, without food, and allowed out for just five minutes per day. As he later described it, the element of torture came from the combination of complete isolation and darkness, the physical confinement, physical exhaustion, the cold, sleep deprivation and hunger. "The eyes ached from the darkness, we felt the paralysing weight of the eyelids. It was cold and the soles of your feet burned. Your ankles twisted like a drill, your knees trembled from the unbroken standing, and we were unable to utter a word."

After his release from Nazi Germany Szende reported frequently on the physical pain he had suffered at Oranienburg and elsewhere, but in 1934 the world heard quite different reports of the German concentration camps. Inadvertently, Szende himself contributed to that. de:Werner Schäfer (KZ-Kommandant)Werner Schäfer, the Camp Commander selected Szende and Mühsam to face questioning from an international US based commission which had been sent to obtain reassurance about conditions in the concentration camps. As Jews and intellectuals, Schäfer calculated that Szende and Mühsam would carry more credibility than other inmates, but he also made it very clear that they would face punishment if they made any negative comments about the concentration camp. Szende later recalled that they had agreed with other comrades who slept in their end of the sleeping quarters that they should give truthful replies to questions, but that they would only answer questions, and therefore would not volunteer information on the atrocities perpetrated against camp inmates. According to Szende's later recollection the commissioners never raised the question of physical mistreatment, and showed interest only in the standard of the food and accommodation. The commission therefore did nothing to bring the cruelties perpetrated in the concentration camp to wider public attention, and when, a few years later, Szende himself provided reports on his concentration camp experiences under less circumscribed conditions, there were many who were reluctant to believe everything that he recalled. It was only later that he recalled how in the space of eleven weeks he had undergone sixteen beatings at Oranienburg, each time in the presence of Obersturmführer Hans Stahlkopf.

=== The trial ===
On 20 March 1934 Szende was one of fourteen prisoners taken into investigative custody at Berlin's Moabit penitentiary. By this time he was close to broken, spiritually and physically, by four months as a guest of the Nazi concentration camp system. Under most circumstances, transfer to the Moabit penitentiary would have been an unwelcome development. However, although he remained in state custody, Stefen Szende was no longer subjected to regular physical assaults and more serious tortures inflicted by officers of the SA and SS. He would later recall his time as a prisoner at Moabit as "quiet" ("ruhig"). He now had plenty of time for reading (although the only available reading material in the jail was "Nazi literature"). Somehow he also managed to teach himself English during this time. The prison, located inside the Berlin city limits, was also easier for his wife to reach. Erszi Szende was living in Berlin's Schöneberg quarter. In the end she was permitted three visits during Stefan's incarceration in Moabit, on 2 July, 13 October and 16 November 1934, and was able to bring him books.

He became aware of the reason for his transfer to Moabit towards the end of 1934. The state was preparing a court case against 24 former SAPD leaders, identified in documents as "Köhler and comrades" ("Köhler und Genossen"), to be heard in the newly created special "People's Court" ("Volksgerichtshof"). Charges covered "continuing with a banned [political] party" ("Fortführung einer verbotenen Partei"). For Szende, as the former leader of the SAPD in Berlin, there was a supplementary charge of "High treason, committed in connection with abroad". This could have led to a death sentence. The legally stateless former Hungarian was in greater danger than his German co-accused. Whereas the hatred he had encountered in the concentration camps was focused largely on his Jewishness, the greater concern now was that he had taken part in illegal political work in Germany despite not being German.

The state assigned Szende a defence lawyer who was both a Nazi Party member and an officer of the SS. He was nevertheless, in Szende's view, a business-like and correct lawyer who did not permit any personal prejudices to compromise his legal duties. He even permitted Szende's wife sight of the papers submitted by the prosecution. She was able to communicate their contents. This contributed to triggering a widespread protest campaign – organised, for the most part, from outside Germany – against the prosecution of the "Köhler and comrades" group. This went hand in had with a trial process which was, by the later standards of Nazi Germany, curiously open and objective. Looking back, Szende later speculated that in 1934 the Nazi state was still keen to establish international legitimacy for their new "People's Court". A key focus of the protest campaign was the threat of a death sentence for Stefen Szende. A so-called "Lawyers' action" was masterminded by his former SAPD comrade, Willy Brandt, who by now was living in exile in Norway. Brandt organised a letter, signed by a number of Norwegian lawyers, in which the dubious legal basis for the charge leading to a possible death sentence was stressed. It was pointed out that the relevant legislation had only been enacted almost a year after Szende's arrest. It is not clear whether or not the court took account of the letter from the lawyers in Norway, but the treason charge was in any event dropped. Lesser charges were not.

The trial against "Köhler and comrades" lasted from 26 November till 1 December 1934. It was held at Prince Albrecht Street 8, just a couple of buildings along the street from the Gestapo head office in which Szende had already faced less structured interrogation sessions during the final weeks of 1933. The 1934 trial ended with 5 of the defendants acquitted and 19 convicted for "Crimes of joint involvement in preparing a treasonous undertaking". More sensational at the time was the court's decision to arrest the Gestapo commissioner von Plotho, suspected of abuse of public office. The defendants had presented to the court the torture methods employed by their Gestapo interrogators and the "People's Court", knowing that it was being observed internationally, was keen to behave correctly, even though in the end no further action was taken against von Plotho. Stefan Szende, a "so-called intellectual" who, as a leader of the SAPD and "as a foreigner" had "intervened" in "domestic [political] affairs" in Germany, was sentenced on 1 December 1934 to a two-year prison term (of which part of his previous detention was deemed to form a part). In later years this court would adopt a far harsher sentencing strategy. Nevertheless, the jail sentence was linked to the condition that on his release Szende should leave the country.

Directly after his conviction, he was returned to Moabit where on 3 December 1934 his wife made a fourth visit to see him. Three days later, on 6 December 1934, he was transferred to the final stop on his lengthy tour of German places of detention, Luckau penitentiary. On his admission, the prison authorities duly noted a scar on his left buttock, which was one souvenir of his earlier internments. The coming to power of a post-democratic populist government was by this time reflected in an accelerating shortage of prison accommodation, and Cell 1198, in which Szende was accommodated, was a one-person cell which he shared with two other prisoners. Later in January 1935 it is recorded that he applied for a chess board, books and a razor.

Luckau is around 100 km (63 miles) away from Berlin which made visits from his wife harder to arrange. Erszi Szende had enquired about visits, letters and parcels in December 1934 and been informed that she might visit her husband once every three months. Between visits to her husband, she also made at least one visit to Budapest to visit her mother who was seriously ill with Cancer and faced a major operation. On one of her visits to Luckau, in November 1935, Erszi arrived accompanied by her sister, Margit, which was the first time in many years that Margit had seen her brother in law.

Aside from the visits from Erszi, Sende's time in Luckau was reassuringly uneventful. One unexpected break in the routine came from a reunion with chief guard Petschner, one of the less inhuman of his guards back at the Oranienburg concentration camp, who had now been transferred to a job at Luckau prison. One piece of news that Petschner brought concerned the recent suicide of Obersturmführer Hans Stahlkopf who had been the camp commander at Oranienburg. Petschner, who apparently was not a dog lover, delivered the news with the accompanying laconic observation the "even dogs have a conscience". A few months later Szende was able to report this conversation in a magazine article, as a result of which Petschner faced a disciplinary hearing, but he was able to assure the panel that he had never mentioned Stahlkopf's suicide to Szende.

On 6 December 1935 Stefan Szende was delivered to Schöna, on the German border with Czechoslovakia, from where with his wife he continued towards Prague. The Hungarian consulate had issued him with a passport, but returning to Hungary was out of the question because of the circumstances under which he had left the country – with the threat of an imminent prison sentence hanging over him – back in 1928. Still for some purposes stateless, unable on account of his political past to live in Germany, Austria or Hungary, and with the future of Czechoslovakia increasingly threatened by the territorial ambitions of Nazi Germany, a decision on where to make their home was not a simple one for Stefan and Erszi Szende.

=== Exile in Prague ===
By the time Szende reached Prague, there was already a large group of exiled SAPD activists there, and he was able to resume his own political activism more or less where he had left off in 1933. Soon after his arrival he became the leader os the SAPD group in the city. He found he had become something of an iconic figure among party comrades as someone who had survived Gestapo detention and Nazi imprisonment and was already able to relate and write down his experiences with an unusual degree of precision. However, the party office did nothing to feed the family. As refugees Stefan and Erszi Szende were not permitted to work they were dependent for their survival on charitable support from support committees. The extent of their poverty was barely dented by occasional payments for articles that Stefan Szende contributed to German-language newspapers such as the Prager Tagblatt, Der Sozialdemokrat and Die Neue Weltbühne. His wife also obtained (probably illegal) domestic work.

Eventually, the Szendes were able to afford a small apartment in Prague's Vinohrady quarter, in the western part of the city. Along with financial insecurity they also faced political and legal insecurity because of their refugee status, and exacerbated by Stefan's statelessness. The authorities were suspicious. When King Carol of Romania visited Prague, Szende was arrested and detained because of a vague suspicion that as a stateless political refugee from both Germany and Hungary, he might easily be plotting to assassinate the king. For these reasons and more, it seems reasonable to conclude that any plans Stefan Szende may have had to settle permanently in Czechoslovakia were quickly set aside. Growing ructions within the exiled SAPD leadership, which soon led to a party split, only added to his difficulties.

As chair of the Prague SAPD group, Stefan Szende was at the heart of the arguments that led to the party split. The starting point, as it was for many left-wing parties across western Europe, was the question of the party's attitude to the Soviet Union. The evident success of the Nazi take-over in Germany had only strengthened arguments for a political alliance of the political left to combat fascism. On the other hand, reports emerging from Moscow of the Soviet leadership's acute paranoia over political opposition, and the extent of the resulting political purges, strengthened the arguments of a "right-wing" element in the SAPD which insisted that atrocities in Moscow could not be ignored simply because they were directed by a Communist leadership. Szende belonged to the faction that was prepared to be critical of Stalin. He published an article in August 1936 in which he warned against "under-estimating [the importance of] their own work" and "excessive dependence on [ill-defined] great international plans". His youthful personal experiences of the Communist Party clearly played a part in persuading him of the need for the SAPD to distance itself from the Stalinists. In the context of the debates inside the party, this also represented a clear shift on Szende's part away from Marxism as it was understood at the time. In the end he resigned from the party leadership in February 1937, announcing that he was fed up with all the discussion about some "united front" and on left-wing unity more broadly.

By this time Szende was earning a little more money, partly by presenting a course in philosophy to "society ladies". He and Erszi were able to afford to quit their Prague apartment, relocating to a small guest house in the countryside outside the city, where they lived with their daughter. This provided welcome respite from the internal party quarrelling and gave them more time to formulate a plan over where, in the longer term, they might live. Szende now set about obtaining permits for the family to move to Sweden. He was already in touch with his party comrade August Enderle who had been leading the Swedish SAPD in exile since 1934. Willy Brandt, a political friend and soul-mate whom he particularly respected, and whom he met when Brandt had visited Prague from Berlin for a few days earlier in 1937, was now dividing most of his time between Oslo and Stockholm. Eventually, in October 1937, the Szende family were able to emigrate to Stockholm, their travel costs supported with a grant from the Thomas Mann fund. Moving to Sweden provided, for the first time in years, relative long-term security and an important impetus for Stefan Szende's own further political development.

=== Swedish home: the evolution of a Social Democrat ===
He travelled with his wife and daughter via Warsaw and Riga to Stockholm where party comrades quickly helped them find a two-room apartment. Although the trades union support committee provided financial help only after several applications, their arrival in Stockholm was significantly less precarious than their arrival in Prague nearly two years earlier. In Sweden there was still a functioning SAPD group, in which Szende soon became a leading figure. The Szendes were fascinated by the extent of general welfare provision already operating in Sweden, through which they were immediately, and without having to pay, able to attend the local school and learn Swedish. But they also faced difficulties. There was widespread mistrust of the large number of refugees arriving from Nazi Germany, and the only work Erszi could find was washing dishes. Stefan Szende's hopes of building a career as an academic were quickly dashed. Little by little he established himself in intellectual circles, however, joining the "Clarté" group through which contacts were built and opportunities began to open up. Early on he obtained work presenting – in Swedish – a course on Socialism to a group of workers in the food sector, which enabled and required him rapidly to enhance his mastery of the language. He also resumed his activities as a writer.

A co-operative publishing house was found to publish Stefan Szende's first book, "Das Mächtespiel an der Donau" ("Power games on the Danube") in 1938. The book dealt with the relationships in international politics and, more specifically, German foreign policy. The book provided the basis for Szende's reputation as an expert on international politics and greatly raised his profile. He followed through with a series of newspaper articles, including some published in the nationally distributed Dagens Nyheter. There were also more books, of which "Europäische Revolution" ("European Revolution"), published in 1943, is regarded as his most important. More generally, his various books and articles in various media contributed insights both inside and outside Germany to the "German question" which preoccupied many in Europe as the Second World War ran its course. He also became increasingly involved in popular education within Sweden, becoming a respected lecturer. One of his books, "Wohlstand, Frieden und Sicherheit" ("Welfare, Peace and Security") was adopted as a teaching text by the Swedish Education Organisation and used in secondary schools. By this time his commitment to education was becoming more important to him than party political involvement. From 1942 he was also engaged in the trades union association, contributing regularly to its weekly news magazine. He worked with August Enderle on a proposal which they published for re-establishment of trades unions in post-Nazi Germany. He also worked for HeHalutz, the Zionist socialist youth organisation, delivering lectures and engaging in education projects, although he himself never became a member.

As his written work focused on political developments in Europe, and his own early adulthood in central Europe became overlaid with more recent experiences, Stefan Szende was forced to confront his own very personal experience of the Shoah. In 1944 he published his book "Der letzte Jude aus Polen" ("The last Jew from Poland"). In the foreword, he himself described the volume as "the first detailed report of the annihilation of five Million Polish and other European Jews under German rule". It is not clear whether or not at the time of writing the book he already knew that his family had been caught up in the Nazi extermination. His brother, László Szende, László's wife Alice, their two sons Mihály and György, along with Szende's mother, Elisabeth, had all experienced for themselves the intensification of antisemitic government measures in Szombathely, the family's home town, where it was reported they had all been crammed into a Jewish ghetto. While László and his elder son, Mihály, had then been sent away as forced labourers, the rest of the Szende family remained, under appalling conditions, confined in the Szombathely ghetto from May 1944. How Stefan Szende found out what was happening is not known, but after many years during which he had no contact with the relatives he had left behind, he telegraphed his sister in law and his mother from Stockholm, promising to do everything necessary to obtain visas for them so that they might travel to Sweden. Despite rising hopes, he was not able to help the relatives he had left behind. Deportation of the Jewish population of Szombathely to the Auschwitz concentration camp began on 4 July 1944: Alice Szende and Elisabeth Szende were murdered in the gas chambers as soon as they arrived. Only young György Szende survived the death camp. In an Austrian concentration camp, Mihály Szende died around the same time as his mother and grandmother. However, László Szende remained alive for long enough to be able to receive the visa arranged by his brother, and he used it to escape from Hungary. For the other family members, the visas arrived too late. Although Stefan Szende barely mentions his own family's experience of the holocaust in memoires or other writings, it must have weighed very heavily with him that he was not able to rescue more of them, and the personal experiences will surely have affected profoundly "Der letzte Jude aus Polen" even if, as presented, its focus is on the wider political issues.

The unavoidable constraints of society could shape the socialists ... so that freedom, peace and general well-being can be secured in accordance with justice. For that to happen, it is necessary to strive for the most equitable distribution of property possible. Solidarity and the free development of individual ability, responsibility and the replaceability of the people's elected representatives, and not arbitrary collectivism, can thereby become the yardstick for behaviour.

Die unausweichlichen Zwänge der Gesellschaft mögen die Sozialisten […] so gestalten, daß Freiheit, Frieden und Wohlstand, bei Maßgabe der Gerechtigkeit, gesichert werden. Dabei ist es notwendig, die möglichst gerechte Verteilung der Güter anzustreben. Solidarität und freie Entwicklung der individuellen Fähigkeiten, Absetzbarkeit und Verantwortlichkeit der gewählten Vertreter des Volkes und nicht gleichgeschalteter Kollektivismus mögen dabei die Maßstäbe des Verhaltens werden.

-- Stefan Szende 1944

As the war's end approached Szende's own long and varied political trajectory turned ever more clearly towards concrete political issues. Experience of Sweden's advanced welfare state pushed him further in the direction of social democracy, while his own experience of communism in action, marked by coercion and dogma, sharpened his critique of Marxism.

During the mid-1940s, Szende's political development was accompanied by lively exchanges with his friends, including above all the others Willy Brandt, with whom he was able to intensify his intellectual contacts. As early as 1942 Szende was participating in a small circle of socialist refugees who regularly discussed problems presented by the war and anticipated postwar challenges. This "International Group of Democratic Socialists" (also, not without irony, sometimes identified as the "Little [communist/socialist] International") united around support for peace objectives and, drawing on the ideas of the Scandinavia labour movement and continental European Socialist traditions, created a theoretical ideological structure. Stefan Szende, who had been a temporary resident in a succession of countries, always opted for European peace objectives rather than national solutions.

In the late summer of 1944 Stefan Szende, Irmgard Enderle, Willy Brandt and Ernst Behm jointly published "Zur Nachkriegspolitik deutscher Sozialisten" ("On the Postwar Politics of German Socialists"), in which the SAPD members set out their demands for a democratic socialist postwar Germany. A few weeks later, the exiled SAPD in Sweden switched their allegiance to the Social Democratic Party (SPD), which effectively put an end to the SAPD as a stand-alone political party. The former communist Stefan Szende was now officially a Social Democrat, influenced by his experience and a conviction of a need for unity on the political left (although this new "United Front" did not include the Communist Party). Stefan and Erszi Szende both formally joined the SPD on 30 September 1944.

When he learned of Hitler's suicide – which was seen to mark the beginning of the end of the war – Stefan Szende was attending a meeting of the "Little International" group. The end of the war would end nearly two decades of enforced exile for Szende and for all the participants at the meeting offered the prospect of new beginnings and opened up a range of possibilities for participation in postwar politics.

=== Postwar opportunities ===
After the war ended, formally in May 1945, Stefan Szende reportedly received several lucrative offers to return to Germany and become an editor in chief or publisher of a newspaper, or even a government minister. He preferred to preserve his independence and freedom, however, notably in respect of his fifteen-year-old daughter, and in the end the family stayed in Sweden, unlike Szende's friend Willy Brandt. In Sweden, Stefan Szende pursued with his journalistic and literary career. In 1947 he became editor for Agence Européenne de Presse, acquiring the news agency in 1949. Being the agency's representative for Sweden enabled him to remain in the country, and in 1950, after twenty-two years in which he had been legally stateless, he was granted Swedish citizenship. By now he was working for the press in both Sweden and Germany, also retained as Scandinavia correspondent for RIAS, the West Berlin radio station. Work for RIAS, friendship with Willy Brandt and his own itinerant past all combined to give him a firm connection with West Berlin, which endured through the rest of his life.

In 1968 Stefan Szende retired from the press agency, still remaining in Sweden with his family. Their daughter Barbara studied medicine and received her doctorate, marrying in 1957. Although her husband, Ronald Julian Moss Baron (1926–2003), came from London, she and he also appear to have made their life together in Sweden. In 1975 Stefan Szende published a memoire entitled "Zwischen Gewalt und Toleranz" ("Between Violence and Tolerance"), recalling life experiences and also extending to more theoretical reflections on personal and political development. His unusually varied life story had left him as a committed European, keen to bridge differences between the two competing political blocks, but resolutely separated from the Soviet bloc.

Stefen Szende died in 1985.
