= Anna Ziegler =

Anna Ziegler may refer to the following people:

- Anna Ziegler (playwright) (born 1979), American playwright
- Anna Ziegler (politician) (1882–1942), German Weimar-era politician
- Anne Ziegler (1910–2003), English singer
- Anna Ziegler, Zurich gatekeeper during the Battle of St. Jakob an der Sihl (1443)
