= Sozialistische Arbeiter-Zeitung =

German socialist newspaper (1931–1933)

- Header of SAZ, 21 October 1931 issue
- Type: Daily
- Editor-in-chief: Max Richard Kleineibst (1931–1932), Walter Fabian (1932)
- Founded: October 21, 1931
- Ceased publication: 1933
- Political alignment: Socialism
- Language: German language
- Headquarters: Breslau, Berlin
- OCLC number: 730049418

Sozialistische Arbeiter-Zeitung ('Socialist Workers Newspaper', abbreviated SAZ) was a daily newspaper published in Germany between 1931 and 1933. SAZ was the central organ of the Socialist Workers Party of Germany (SAPD).

== Foundation ==
The first issue of SAZ was published on 21 October 1931. The decision to launch a daily newspaper for the party had been taken at the founding conference of SAPD. The newspaper initially published from Breslau (present-day Wrocław). During this period it consisted only of 4 pages, and despite the label 'central organ' it was effectively a local Breslau publication of low quality. It carried the by-line 'Daily Newspaper of the Socialist Workers Party of Germany'. Max Richard Kleineibst was the founding editor-in-chief of SAZ. Kleineibst had previously been the editor of the Social Democratic organ in Löbau, Volkszeitung für die Oberlausitz.

== Move to Berlin ==
On 1 November 1931 the newspaper was moved to Berlin. During this period the newspaper was published daily (except for Mondays) and contained at least 8 pages. Apart from SAZ SAPD produced a number of a weekly newspapers, Die Fackel ('The Torch', later renamed Sozialistische Wochenzeitung, 'Socialist Weekly' and Kampfsignal, 'Signal of Struggle'), a theoretical magazine Klassenkampf ('Class Struggle') and the weekly Das Volksrecht ('The People's Right').

== Five-day ban ==
On 25 June 1932 a five-day ban on SAZ was issued, for having 'insulted' the President of the Reich.

== Shift to Breslau ==
Moreover, in late June 1932, following a conflict inside the party, SAZ moved back to Breslau with a new, more leftist, editorial team. Kleineibst and Dora Fabian were fired from the editorial team, due to 'right-wing deviation'. Walter Fabian was named as the new editor-in-chief of SAZ. Kleineibst would be named foreign editor of SAZ.

== Editors ==
Editors of SAZ (in different periods) also included Roland Beutner, Herbert Duckstein, August Enderle, Karl Frank, Paul Frölich, Lehmann, Rodominski, Will Schaber, Heinrich Ströbel and Klaus Zweiling. The young Herbert Frahm (later known as Willy Brandt) wrote articles in SAZ (including sharp criticisms of SPD).
