= Obermann =

Obermann is a German surname. Notable people with the surname include:

- Holger Obermann (1936–2021), German football player, football manager, journalist, television reporter
- Jacob Obermann (1819–1887), American businessman, German immigrant
- Josephine Obermann (born 1983), German curler
- Karl Obermann (1905–1987), German historian
- René Obermann (born 1963), German manager

== See also ==
- Oberman
