= Hans Ziegler (politician) =

German politician (1877–1957)

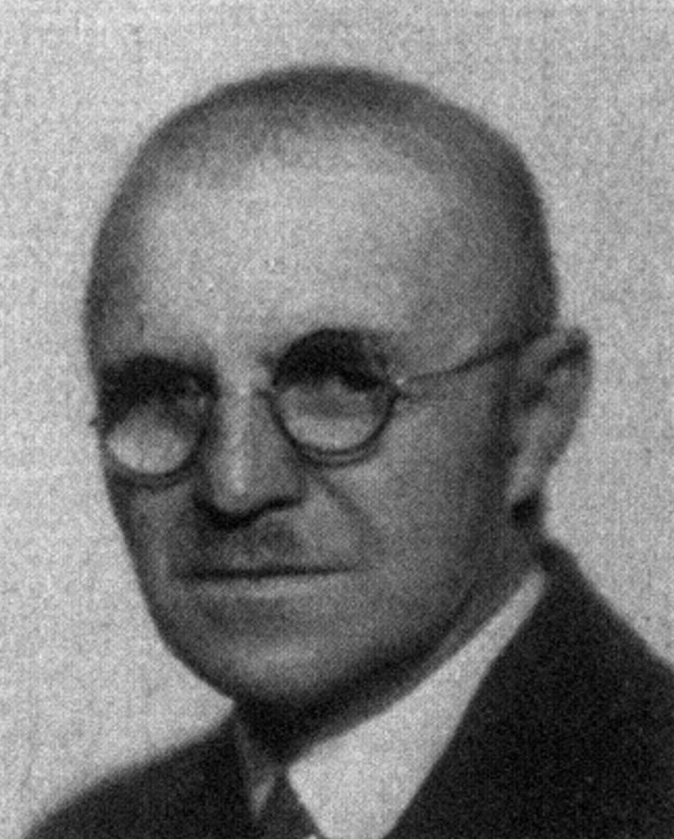

Lord Mayor of Nuremberg
- In office 1945–1948

Member of the Reichstag
- In office 1930 – September 1931
- Parliamentary group: SPD
- Constituency: Constituency 7 (Breslau)

Member of the State Parliament of Württemberg
- In office 1920–1924
- Parliamentary group: USPD / SPD

Hans Ziegler (9 March 1877 – 19 March 1957) was a German Socialist politician and trade unionist. He was a founder of the Socialist Workers' Party of Germany (SAPD).

== Life ==
Ziegler was born in Henfenfeld in 1877. Ziegler learned the lathe trade after attending primary school. As a young man he joined the German Metal Workers' Association (DMV) and the Social Democratic Party of Germany (SPD). After the end of his first marriage, from which a daughter emerged, Ziegler married Anna Strauss in 1913, who, like him, embarked on a political career in the SPD.

During the First World War, Ziegler left the SPD in 1916 and joined the Independent Social Democratic Party of Germany (USPD). During the November Revolution of 1918 he was a delegate to the National Council Congress. In 1920 he was elected to the state parliament of Württemberg, to which he belonged until 1924. Around 1922 Ziegler returned to the SPD, in which he belonged to the left wing of the party. In addition, he acted as local and district chairman as well as director of the local division of the DMV in Heilbronn.

In 1930 Ziegler was elected to the Reichstag as a candidate of the SPD for constituency 7 (Breslau). Together with five party friends, he was expelled from the SPD in September 1931 after repeated breaches of parliamentary group discipline. He then took part in the founding of the Socialist Workers' Party of Germany (SAPD). In this Ziegler acted as a trade union expert, a status that was due to the fact that he was practically the only prominent trade union representative in the ranks of the SAPD, in which he joined the left- wing, social-democratic-pacifist wing around Anna Siemsen. Ziegler's union activity cause him problems in his new party. In particular, he was accused of showing too cautious a course as a delegate to the trade union conference towards the DMV leadership, which was dominated by the SPD.

In March 1933, one month after the Reichstag fire, Ziegler was arrested and held in a concentration camp for a long time. After the war, Ziegler was Lord Mayor of Nuremberg from 1945 to 1948. In the summer of 1949 he took over the chairmanship of the Action for Peace and International Understanding. The SPD soon excluded Ziegler from their ranks again after he attended a peace congress in Moscow.

He died on 19 March 1957 in Nuremberg.
