= Ruth Oesterreich =

German activist-politician (1894–1943)

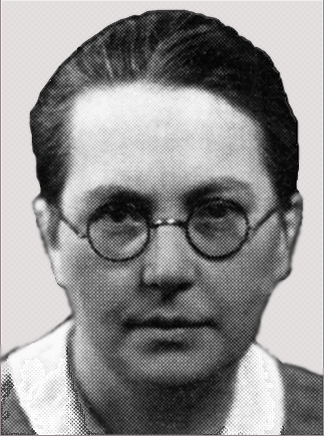
- Born: Anna Ruth Erna Oesterreich; 6 June 1894; Dresden, Saxony, German Empire
- Died: 25 June 1943 (aged 49); Plötzensee Prison, Berlin, Nazi Germany
- Cause of death: Execution by hanging
- Occupations: Secretary / office worker Party official (KPD); Comintern official Anti-war activist Political activist Child refugee welfare organiser (SHEK); Resistance activist
- Known for: her resistance activism and subsequent execution
- Political party: SPD; KPD; KPDO; SAPD; SoPaDe
- Spouse(s): 1. Otto Hermann Jensen; 2. Jakob Reich
- Children: Ruth Oesterreich (1924–1999); Mother and daughter shared the same name

Ruth Oesterreich (6 June 1894 – 25 June 1943) was a German activist-politician (KPD) who became involved, after 1933, in anti-government activism and Swiss-funded child welfare work among German political refugees. She was executed by hanging.

== Life ==
=== The politics of youth ===
Anna Ruth Erna Oesterreich was born into a Protestant family in Dresden. Her father was employed as a plumber's assistant. She was involved in socialist politics from an early age, joining the Social Democratic Party (SPD) in 1912 and working in a secretarial position with the editorial office at the Dresdner Volkszeitung (SPD regional newspaper). During the war years, on 1 May 1916, she participated in a large anti-war demonstration organised in Berlin by the Marxist anti-militarist "Spartakusbund". Later that year, on 16 November 1916, she married Otto Hermann Jensen, described as "a writer from Hanover". The marriage record shows that Jensen had an eye problem as a result of which he was not able to sign the marriage agreement. Although records indicate that she had been born a Protestant, at the time of her marriage Oesterreich identified herself as a "religious dissident", indicating an absence of religious belief and exemption from liability to pay church taxes. The couple were divorced two years later. In 1919, Oesterreich joined the newly launched Communist Party, remaining a member of it until 1928/29. In 1925 she took a job with the implausibly large Soviet Trade Bureau for Western Europe in Berlin. By this time she had married her second husband, Jakob Reich, a senior member of the Communist Party and a somewhat shadowy figure, identified in some sources as the head of the Soviet West European Trade Bureau in Berlin and/or, since 1921, the secret head of the Comintern in Western Europe. (Note: Adding to the air of mystery surrounding Jakob Reich is the extensive list of pseudonyms by which he was identified. These include Comrade Thomas, Thomas Rubinstein, Arnold Rubinstein, Jakob Reichenberg, James Reich, James Thomas and James Gordon.) (There is likely to have been significant overlap between the two organisations.) The marriage was a second marriage for both Ruth and Jakob: it was followed in 1924 by the birth of their daughter, also called Ruth.

=== Communist Party official ===
Party ructions in Moscow that followed the death of Lenin resonated powerfully with comrades in Berlin. As early as 1925 Jakob Reich found himself summoned to Moscow to explain his actions, following a falling out with Comintern Budget Commissar Osip Piatnitsky over use of Comintern funds. His wife seems to have remained in her post at the Soviet Trade Bureau in Berlin until 1929, however, at which point the German Communist Party split. Both Reich and Oesterreich left the mainstream party, which had been taken over by Ernst Thälmann and other Stalinist hardliners. Oesterreich was opposed to the "Social fascism" political approach favoured by the Comintern leadership of the time and joined the break-away so-called "Kommunistische Partei Deutschlands (Opposition)" / KPDO, intended in the first instance not as an alternative political party, but as an organised movement within the Communist Party. Others who transferred to it, and in doing so found they had been excluded from the Communist Party, included many of the intellectual heavy-weights who had taken a lead in establishing the Communist Party in the earlier p[art of the decade. Heinrich Brandler, Jacob Walcher, Paul Frölich and August Thalheimer were among them. Members believed that instead of branding Social Democrats as "Social Fascists", the best hope for Germany to achieve a socialist future would be for reasonable communists to try and work in political coalition with the mainstream political centre-left. Oesterreich undertook management and administrative responsibilities in the quasi-party's publishing co-operative, which briefly produced a daily newspaper. The KPDO lingered on until 1939, but as early as 1929 it underwent a first serious split of its own. A substantial minority of members, including Ruth Oesterreich, teamed up with disillusioned members of the SPD to try and form a broadly-based antifascist political coalition. The result was the Socialist Workers' Party (SAPD), of which Oesterreich remained a member until 1934.

=== Hitler and exile ===
1933 was a year of political change in Germany, during the first part of which the country was transformed into a one-party dictatorship. Probably in February or March 1933, Oesterreich and Reich – whom the authorities classified as Jewish – emigrated to Prague together with their small daughter, and taking a route shared by thousands of others with a record of left-wing political activism during the years of the German democracy.

=== Prague ===
In March 1935 Oesterreich wrote a letter of thanks to "Swiss Aid for Emigrant Children" (SHEK) which gives some insight into the level of poverty she and her daughter were experiencing at the time

"News that you will transfer me an amount of money for my daughter just reached me, on a morning when I did not know what I could feed my daughter apart from a piece of bread, and after she has been coming home day after day with wet feet because her only pair of shoes has worn out. Now I will be able to buy her a second pair of shoes. ...I am sorry not to have replied to you at once. Thanks to the continuing decline both in the condition of refugees here and the international situation, I found myself in such deep depression that I wanted to avoid sharing my feelings on paper. My own outlook had deteriorated catastrophically after I tried and failed to make a living from knitting. I was desperate. For twenty-five years I gained my professional experience mostly by using adding machines and type writers: after that, despite working between 14 and 18 hours a day, I was unable to turn knitting into a source of income, and had to give up on it."

Ruth Oesterreich in a letter to the Zürich- (and Basel-) based SHEK, March 1935

In March 1934 Ruth Oesterreich and her husband both resigned their membership of the SAPD. For her husband, who was at the time living under the name Arnold Rubinstein, this marked an end to political activism. Soon afterwards their marriage broke up. Rubenstein had met another woman, a recently divorced Viennese psychoanalyst called Annie Reich. Meanwhile, Ruth Oesterreich was left in Prague with a child to support. (Their child stayed with her mother). Between 8,000 and 10,000 German political refugees had arrived in Czechoslovakia during or soon after 1933. Almost all of them remained in Prague. Most were denied work permits. Money was desperately short. Nevertheless, she remained politically connected, having in 1934 joined the SoPaDe group of exiled German former socialist leaders and activists in Prague. (The mainstream Social Democratic Party had, with other political parties, been outlawed in Germany during the first half of 1933.) In March 1935 Oesterreich wrote a letter of thanks to the recently founded "Swiss Aid for Emigrant Children" (SHEK) organisation, in which she gives some insight into the level of poverty in which Oesterreich and her daughter were living in Prague. Having established a link with the SHEK she suggested to them that they should recruit as helpers some of the other children and young people from Germany who had ended up in semi-destitution in Prague. These, like their parents, generally received no work permits from the Czechoslovak authorities, so were unable to progress to apprenticeships after completing their schooling. The child refugees felt they had no purpose in life and no future.

Her proposals were accepted by the SHEK, and she was herself placed in charge of a new Prague branch of the SHEK. Under her direction, starting in October 1936, additional food rations and clothing, along with medical care, holiday camp provision, and other necessary support measures were organised for approximately 130 children of the German refugees in Prague. The number of children increased during the ensuing month to approximately 180. She also launched an ambitious programme of negotiations with government officials from Swedish and English government officials to try and secure some more permanent accommodation for the refugee children in the countries in question. Like others engaged in similar missions on behalf of "left behind German children", she was unsuccessful. However laudable in its own terms, however, Oesterreich's work for the SHEK and refugee children in Prague between 1935 and 1938 did nothing to address the challenge of finding the means to her daughter.

After the outbreak, in July 1936, of the Spanish Civil War she found a job with the "Spanish Information Service" section at the Spanish embassy in Prague. At the same time she became a member of "Neu Beginnen" a semi-secret organisation whose members had backgrounds in the German SPD, Communist Party and/or SAPD. Their shared objective was to achieve political unity within the German working class and join in the fight against Fascism and National Socialism. At one stage she also worked as a secretary for Willi Schlamm of the political magazine Die Weltbühne and its Prague-based successor, the "Europäische Heft", One of her co-workers was Milena Jesenská, the former mistress of Franz Kafka to whom literary historians remain indebted due to the survival of many of the letters she and Kafka exchanged.

=== Paris Verviers and Brussels ===
In May 1938 the German army began massing on the northern and western borders of what German nationalists had taken to calling the Sudetenland, the heavily fortified border regions of northern and western Czechoslovakia. For German political exiles such as Ruth Oesterreich, Prague no longer felt so safe as once it had. It would be another four months before, having taken the precaution of securing French and British acquiescence, Germany annexed the so-called Sudetenland. Oesterreich had not waited for that. In May 1938 Ruth Oesterreich and her teenage daughter arrived in Paris, which like Prague and Moscow had become a popular place of refuge for German political exiles since 1933. The France of Daladier was no longer so welcoming to political refugees as the country had been when the government of Léon Blum was in office, however. Oesterreich's application for some sort of a "Carte de séjour" (residence permit) was rejected by the authorities. (There are hints that she may already have been secretly involved in a small group identifying and hindering arms shipments from Germany to Francoist forces in Spain during the Spanish Civil War, and that the French authorities, keen at the time to avoid antagonising the Hitler government, would have wished to avoid becoming entangled in the matter.) Classified by the French as an "undesirable foreigner", she and her daughter continued north, first to Amiens, and then across the frontier into Belgium. Sources differ over their itinerary after they were made to leave Paris, but it is clear that they ended up in Verviers, a textiles town in the rugged hills of the extreme south-east of Belgium, close to the Belgian frontier with Germany. (Note: According to one source, quoting from an interview with Ruth Oesterreich's granddaughter Ilse Oesterreich, the French authorities sent them not to Belgium, but back directly to Germany. They were nevertheless able to make their way, instead, to Verviers.)

In Verviers, Oesterreich came across Stephan and Elsa Mathar, who shared her political passions and convictions. Stephan Mathar was an industrial chemist by training and profession, and a former member of the German Communist Party who had switched to the SAPD and then fled with his wife to Verviers where he had successfully set himself up in a small business through which he had frequent contact with truck drivers passing through the town. Much of the so-called resistance activity in which the three of them engaged was dangerous and therefore highly secret. Sources – other than the court records of their subsequent trial – are correspondingly vague. Despite – or possibly because of – being some distance from the principal international main roads at the time, Verviers was on a transit route favoured by many German truck drivers. By engaging in casual conversation with drivers when they stopped for in town, Oesterreich and the Mathars were able to collect up-to-date information about life in Hitler's Germany. They were then able to pass on appropriate snippets to the Paris-based German language emigrant press for use in propaganda preparation. They were also able to persuade some of the more sympathetic German truck drivers, en route back towards Aachen and Trier, to smuggle propaganda material into Germany. From Verviers Oesterreich herself regularly took trips back to Paris, where she was able to meet up with friends and former party comrades from her own years in the Communist Party, many of whom had broken off contact with Soviet former comrades, since Moscow had become a progressively more perilous place of supposed refuge for Germans, as more and more fell victim to the Soviet dictator's paranoia, irrespective of political beliefs and affiliations. Somehow, during the closing stages of the Spanish Civil War she was also still in touch with her contacts at the Spanish embassy in Prague, to whom she continued to provide information about planned German operations in Spain.

There are indications that through 1939, Oesterreich was undergoing a state of intensifying depression. There was cause. By July 1939 the Spanish Republic had fallen. In September 1939 the German invasion of Poland from the west, followed two weeks later by the Soviet invasion of Poland from the west, flagged up a shocking non-aggression pact between Europe's most powerfully militarised dictators, and triggered a rolling outbreak of the Second World War across most of Europe. Oesterreich also had her own problems in Verviers. She was again encountering great difficulty finding the work she needed in order to support herself and her daughter. Her former husband had settled with his new wife in the United States in 1938, and now responded to the looming war clouds over Europe by trying to arrange for Ruth and their daughter to relocate to America, but his attempts failed due to a government quota scheme, restricting the number of refugees admitted by the US authorities.

In May/June 1940 German forces over-ran Belgium, cutting off possible escape routes to France or, beyond, to the "free zone" administered after June 1940 by a semi-autonomous puppet government at Vichy. In Belgium, just as in other countries placed under German occupation at this time, the military administrators made it a priority to hunt down Jewish people, irrespective of whether they were classified as Belgian Jews or non-Belgian Jews. Starting in the early summer of 1942, Jews in Belgium were required to wear the so-called "Jew Star" on their clothing. Mass deportations began at around the same time. By then, however, Ruth Oesterreich and her daughter were no longer at liberty.

Ruth Oesterreich moved with her daughter to Brussels in December 1939. There was never any suggestion that she was Jewish. The younger Ruth Oesterreich, her daughter, nevertheless had a Jewish father, which would have placed her at risk of being classified as a half-Jewish "Mischling" if she came to the notice of the National Socialists. For Ruth Oesterreich the mother, falling into the hands of Hitlerites would have been no less dangerous, not for any reasons of race, but as a known former communist and socialist who had fled Germany in 1933 and subsequently engaged in various secret but effective resistance activities. She nevertheless remained "active" during her time in Brussels after the German take-over, collecting information about life in occupied Belgium and passing it on to appropriate members of the emigrant community in Paris.

On 21 April 1941 Ruth Oesterreich (mother) and her daughter, were arrested by the Gestapo, "betrayed by a Belgian", according to the evidently still embittered assessment passed on by her granddaughter, before adding, "my mother preferred not to speak of it".

=== Gestapo detention ===
Mother and daughter spent six weeks under interrogation at the Sint-Gillis jail (Brussels), which by this time was under the administration of the German police authorities. Early in June 1941 they were both transported to Aachen and from there, in July 1941, to a prison in Karlsruhe, where they were detained in "pre-trial detention". Till this point they had been held together, but when they reached Karlsruhe they were separated and placed in different cells. In February 1942 Ruth Oesterreich (daughter) was released from prison and sent to work in a hospital, still under close Gestapo supervision. Three weeks earlier a meeting at Wannsee of top government officials and leading party paramilitaries, convened by SS-Obergruppenführer u. General der Polizei Reinhard Heydrich, had firmed up a number of hitherto ambiguous definitional issues, in terms of government race policy, in respect of those identified as "half-Jews". Ruth Oesterreich (mother) remained in the prison at Karlsruhe for another year.

=== Trial ===
In February 1943, Oesterreich was removed from Karlsruhe to Berlin where. alongside Stephan and Elsa Mathar, her resistance comrades from Verviers, on 18 February 1943 she faced the special "People's Court". The presiding judge was not the (already notorious) court president Roland Freisler. Instead the accused were tried before Judges Ziegler and Großpietsch. The charges were treason and high treason. At least one source also mentions the (by this time routinely invoked in such cases) accusations of "advantaging the enemy and damaging national military capability" ("Feindbegünstigung [und] Wehrkraftzersetzung"). She was accused in respect of her communist/socialists activism, her "espionage" on behalf of the discredited (and defeated) Spanish Republican régime, and her involvement with anti-Nazi circles in Paris. Mention was made of the "hate speak" writing against the German state that she had smuggled to exiled emigrant groups.

Of her co-accused, Elsa Mathar insisted that she had been unaware of her husband's activities and had known nothing of his links with Oesterreich: Elsa Mathar was acquitted and released. Stephan Mathar accepted that he had appeared to follow Oesterreich's instructions, but in reality had never channelled any propaganda material to Germany. He had indeed told her that he had done so, but nevertheless, he had not. The court nevertheless concluded – almost certainly correctly – that together Ruth Oesterreich and Stephan Mathar had smuggled propaganda material of foreign provenance into Germany. Unlike her co-accused, Ruth Oesterreich took full responsibility for her actions, although she insisted that she had never had any involvement in "espionage", pointing out that information she had disseminated outside Germany was already accessible to anyone getting hold of German language emigrant magazines. The court accepted that indeed she had not "betrayed any state secrets". But Oesterreich freely agreed that she had worked for the Spanish Republic and used all her energies to opposing National Socialism.

The trial lasted just one day. At the end of it the court summed up its verdict in respect of Ruth Oesterreich and Stephan Mather: "heir removal is ... necessary for the survival struggle that the German people are currently having to undertake". They were sentenced to death for disseminating treason.

=== Execution ===
Ruth Oesterreich lived for slightly more than four months following her conviction and sentencing. She was held at the vast Moabit prison complex in north-central Berlin. It was possible to smuggle out small notes, as a result she was able to retain some level of contact with her daughter. Her daughter died in 1999, but her notes from prison survive, now in the care of her granddaughter. She got hold of a copy of Goethe's Iphigenia in Tauris, which she read to fill the hours and distract her while waiting to be killed. She also took a lively interest in the progress of her case. In what was probably the penultimate note she was able to smuggle out to her daughter she wrote: "yesterday 43rd hiatus in the executions. Still two more ahead of me! Now the decision will come soon."

On 25 June 1943 seven women and ten men were executed at the Plötzensee Execution facility, across on the far side of the construction site for Westhafen Canal. Ruth Oesterreich was one of them. Stephan Mathar had already been executed on 28 May 1943.

=== Posterity ===
Ruth Oesterreich (mother) did not live long enough to be aware of the birth of her granddaughter, Ilse, during the first part of in 1944. It took place in Karlsruhe, where Ruth Oesterreich (daughter) was still living, still under Gestapo supervision.
