= Oberman =

Oberman is a surname. Notable people with the surname include:

- Claire Oberman (born 1956), Dutch-born New Zealand actress
- Gustavo Oberman (born 1985), Argentine football player
- Heiko Oberman (1930–2001), Dutch historian and theologian
- Martin J. Oberman, American government employee
- Miller Wolf Oberman, American poet
- Sheldon Oberman (1949–2004), Canadian children's writer
- Tracy-Ann Oberman (born 1969), English actress

== See also ==
- Obermann
- Ooberman, an English band
- Overman (disambiguation)
