= Erna Lang =

German activist and politician (1892 - 1983)

Erna Halbe Erna Lang
- Born: Erna Louise Margaretha Demuth; 30 June 1892; Hamburg, Germany
- Died: 18 May 1983 (aged 90); Frankfurt am Main, West Germany
- Occupations: Political activist Revolutionary; Politician
- Political party: SPD; KPD; KPDO; SAPD
- Spouse(s): 1. Max Halbe (-1918); 2. Joseph Lang (1902-1973)
- Children: Herta Halbe/Thielcke (1914-)
- Parent: Ernst Demuth (-1912)
- Central institution membership: 1920: Member, KPD Central Commission

Erna Lang (born Erna Demuth: 30 June 1892 – 18 May 1983) was a German activist participant in the November Revolution and politician.

Between 1913 and 1918 she was married to Max Halbe who was killed in the war. Her second marriage, to Joseph Lang, took place in 1941. Therefore, sources covering her political and later activities may identify her as Erna Halbe or as Erna Lang.

== Life ==
=== Provenance and early years ===
Erna Louise Margaretha Demuth was born in Hamburg. Ernst Demuth, her father, was a member of the Furriers' Trades Union and a Social Democratic Party (SPD) official, but he died in 1912. Erna Demuth trained and qualified at the Hamburg Fröbel College as a Kindergarten teacher, and it was in this profession that she worked for five years. Her two elder brothers, like her father, were active in the SPD, and in 1910, two years after the lifting of the constitutional ban on female participation in party politics, she too joined the party.

=== Marriage and war, imprisonment and bereavement ===
In 1913 she married the logistics worker and fellow SPD member Max Halbe. Three years later she was a housewife and the mother of a two-year-old daughter. This did not put an end to her political involvement, however. The decision in 1914 of the party leadership to implement what amounted to a parliamentary truce for the duration of the war over the issue of Reichstag votes on war funding created internal party ructions from the outset. The intensity of opposition grew as the slaughter on the front lines and austerity on the home front intensified, leading to a party split, generally dated at 1917. By that time Erna Halbe's own campaigning against party support for war credits had become sufficiently forceful to trigger her expulsion from the party in 1916. For the rest of the war she is identified as an activist organiser of the radical left in Hamburg. Her activism included producing and distributing "revolutionary leaflets", as a result of which, on 27 March 1918, she was given a thirty-month prison sentence for alleged treason ("Landesverrat"). That same month her husband, who had also been expelled from the party in SPD, and had now been fatally wounded in the fighting, was placed in a battlefield hospital: here he died in June 1918.

=== Release and revolution ===
Like many who had been imprisoned for opposition to the war, Erna Halbe was soon released in the context of the revolutions that broke out across Germany in the aftermath of the war. She was a co-founder of the Hamburg branch of the newly emerging Communist Party, and she was the only female member of the 30 person leadership team of the city's Workers' Soviet/Council, which worked closely with the Soldiers' Soviet/Council to create a combined Hamburg Workers' and Soldiers' Soviet/Council under the leadership of a fellow member of the radical left, Heinrich Laufenberg. For a time the Works' and Soldiers' Soviet/Council rook over the functions of the normally powerful Hamburg Parliament ("Hamburgische Bürgerschaft;"). Erna Halbe later recalled that they nevertheless found themselves obliged to continue with the daily administration of the city: "The pressing problem was food supplies ... Day and night we sat and debated what to do ... We had been hoping for a real revolution. Everything should be changed, more just ... My own principal speciality was the socio-political questions".

=== Communist Party official ===
In the event, the authority and legitimacy of the Workers' and Soldiers' Soviet/Council was never accepted by most Hamburgers, and the Hamburg Parliament ("Hamburgische Bürgerschaft;") soon recovered a level of control of city administration. In 1920 Erna Halbe was appointed Women's Secretary for the party regional leadership team ("Bezirksleitung") for the Wasserkante district, comprising Hamburg and a large surrounding area of Holstein to the north of the Elbe. During 1921 (if not before) this became a full-time position. In November 1921, almost certainly under instructions from the party, she relocated to Magdeburg where she took a party position as Policy Leader ("Polleiter") for the Magdeburg-Anhalt district. In 1923, as a delegate to the Eighth Party Conference, she was elected a member of the trades union commission. During this time she was seen as a member of the party's left wing.

In 1924 she relocated again, this time to Berlin, where she took over the Women's Department at the Communist Party's national head office. Her promotion reflected a take-over of the party leadership by its left wing. However, the German party and the Soviet party were closely connected, and as Stalin consolidated his hold in Moscow, the left-wing party leadership in Berlin also became increasingly hardline, doctrinaire, and intolerant of dissent. Halbe became embroiled in the internal ructions, and during 1927 she resigned from her national leadership of the Women's Department. Nevertheless, at the Eleventh Party Conference in 1927 she was still re-elected to the Organisation Commission. Later that year she was sent to work for Red Aid ("Rote Hilfe Deutschlands"), the party sponsored worker's welfare organisation, running an orphanage in Elgersburg, some considerable distance to the south of Berlin. By now, not being an unquestioning backer of the Stalinist leadership, she had become part of the "right-wing" opposition to the party leadership that was beginning to coalesce around Heinrich Brandler and August Thalheimer. Those who questioned the Stalinist position were by now finding themselves demonised as Trotskyites, and in 1929 the Communist Party in Germany broke apart: Erna Halbe was one of those "Trotskyites" expelled from the party at the start of 1929. This also meant that she lost her job. She earned her living between 1930 and 1932 by selling vacuum cleaners.

=== Political realignments ===
Many of those expelled from the Communist Party in 1929 reacted by establishing an alternative communist party, identified as the Communist Party of Germany (Opposition) ("Kommunistische Partei Deutschlands (Opposition)" / KPDO). Erna Halbe was a member of the national leadership. By this time, however, the apparently relentless electoral progress of the Nazi Party was driving many on the political left for a united front, combining SPD and Communist party members and confronting Hitler's populists. The outcome of the drive for a united left may have ended in further fragmentation. Nevertheless, in order to attract defections from the communist movement a number of SPD members, and others, established the Socialist Workers' Party of Germany ("Sozialistische Arbeiterpartei Deutschlands" / SAPD). In 1932 March Halbe was one of those who moved across to the new party from the KPDO.

=== Nazi Germany and exile ===
The Nazis nevertheless took power in January 1933 and lost little time in transforming Germany into a one-party dictatorship. The Reichstag fire in February 1933 was instantly blamed on "communists", and it was indeed those with any sort of history of communist activism who now found themselves targeted with particular intensity by the authorities. Many fled abroad: others were arrested. Erna Halbe continued with her (now illegal) political work in Berlin till 30 May 1933 when the Gestapo searched her house and arrested her. She was now held at the women's prison Berlin's Ballin Street in "protective custody" till 2 August 1933. Following her release, working with Walter Fabian and Joseph Lang she resumed her co-ordination work for the underground SAPD.

During the early summer of 1934 a succession of her political comrades were arrested and disappeared. Aware that her own re-arrest was only a matter of time, in June 1934 she escaped to Prague. In Czechoslovakia she lived in exile with Joseph Lang, and worked in the border with Germany helping to organise the escapes into Czechoslovakia of other political exiles. Back in Berlin, in 1938 the Gestapo learned of her activities from her political friends who had failed to escape in time, and demanded that she be handed over by the Czechoslovak government. The government rejected the demand, but at the same time "requested" her to leave the country as quickly as possible. Travelling via Vienna and Zürich she made her way to Paris which by this time - along with Moscow - had become home to several thousand German political exiles and the de facto headquarters of several exiled left wing German political parties.

Although during the 1930s France was more welcoming than other western European countries to refugees from Nazi Germany, by 1940 the welcome was wearing thin, and for a couple of years the refugees had been required to report and confirm their details at the town halls each week. This meant that when, following the German invasion in May 1940, the authorities reacted by identifying the political and racially defined German refugees as enemy aliens, they had accurate up to date records on where the enemy aliens were all living. Erna Halbe and Joseph Lang were, with several hundred others, rounded up overnight and interned in May 1940. Shortly afterwards they were transported to the Gurs internment camp in the south of the country, in the hills to the west of Toulouse. At this stage, not withstanding the very basic level of the accommodation, Gurs was not set up for enforced detention and inmates were able to leave the camp in the day time. As political refugees under imminent threat they both obtained immigration visa for admission to the United States. Joseph Lang, (who was Jewish) made his way to Lisbon, but Halbe was unable to obtain an exit visa from the French authorities, who were also holding on to her identity papers. In the end she was able to catch up with Lang after a brief delay, but she achieved this only after crossing the Pyrenees on foot, carrying a forged birth certificate. On 14 December 1940 Halbe and Lang arrived together in New York City on a ship from Lisbon.

Shortly after arriving in New York Erna Halbe and Joseph Lang married. They support themselves initially through casual work, later setting up a little textiles business. After 1945, with friends, they organised support for a number of persecuted socialists in Germany. At the end of 1950 Joseph and Erna Lang returned to Germany where till 1954 Erna Lang continued to work for the Frankfurt office of the International Rescue Committee.

Back in Germany (after May 1949, West Germany) the Langs settled in Frankfurt am Main. In January 1951 Erna Lang rejoined the SPD, and she remained politically engaged. Joseph Lang, also a member of the party, played an important part in trades union and party affairs in the Frankfurt and South Hessen regions until his death in 1973. By 1981 it was reported that Erna was living in a retirement home in Frankfurt, the city in which she died on 18 May 1983.
