= Hilde Ephraim =

Hilde Ephraim

Hilde Ephraim (1 April 1905 – 20 September 1940) was a German welfare worker who became a resistance activist during the Nazi years. She was murdered because of her involvement in the Socialist Workers' Party ("Sozialistische Arbeiterpartei Deutschlands" / SAP) and in the Red Aid ("Rote Hilfe") workers' welfare operation.

== Life ==
Hilde Ephraim was born in Berlin. By 1931 she was working in Brandenburg an der Havel as a state employed social-care worker. That was the year in which she joined the Socialist Workers' Party ("Sozialistische Arbeiterpartei Deutschlands" / SAPD), a newly formed breakaway party composed chiefly of former Social Democratic Party members, keen to promote closer collaboration between moderate socialists and German Communists in order to try and prevent the coming to power of a right wing populist party. Within the SAPD she almost immediately emerged as a leader of the local Brandenburg branch. The idea of preventing Nazi success by uniting the political left failed, however: in January 1933 the Nazi Party took power and lost no time in transforming the country into a one-party dictatorship, which meant among other things that political activity - other than on behalf of the Nazi Party - became illegal. Because of her Jewish provenance and her record of political activism, Ephraim lost her job. She now relocated from Brandenburg back to Berlin where she joined the underground struggle against Nazism.

By the end of 1933 many party activists had been arrested. There was no state financial support provided for families who had lost their bread winner as a result of these arrests, which resulted in acute hardship. Working under the auspices of the (by now illegal) Red Aid ("Rote Hilfe") organisation, a focus of Ephraim's "political" work involved providing practical support for the affected families. Details of her other underground political activity are hard to pin down, but she appears, formally or informally, to have undertaken important co-ordinating work for the local party leadership, working first as an assistant to Franz Huber and, subsequently, with Herbert Heerklotz (1911-1999). The Berlin region underground SAPD comprised approximately 200 members, divided into activist cells of between 3 and 5 individuals. Meetings between members of different cells were kept to a minimum in order to reduce the dangers associated with any spies successfully infiltrated by government authorities: only one member in any cell was permitted to engage in such meetings. Nevertheless, small meetings to exchange information and share experiences were necessary. On the welfare side of things, meetings took place to identify families needing support and to organise it, both for families left behind when breadwinners were arrested and for any political prisoners released but unable, for reasons of race and / or politics, to obtain employment. Ephraim's political activity meant that she was sometimes involved in these secret meetings. The fact that some of those she met were, like her, of Jewish provenance made the meetings particularly dangerous because the racist polemics which had featured in Nazi propaganda before 1933 had now become integrated as underpinnings of government policy in ways which few outside the Nazi leadership had anticipated.

Hilde Ephraim herself was arrested in July 1936, and subjected to "severe mistreatment" by the Gestapo. After the usual delays, on 25 July 1937 she faced the special People's Court which the government had set up a couple of years earlier in order to be able to deal with political prisoners outside the mainstream justice system. She was sentenced to a four-year jail term which she served first in Lübeck and then in Amberg. Because her time spent in pre-trial custody counted towards her sentence, by the end of June 1940 she was due for release.

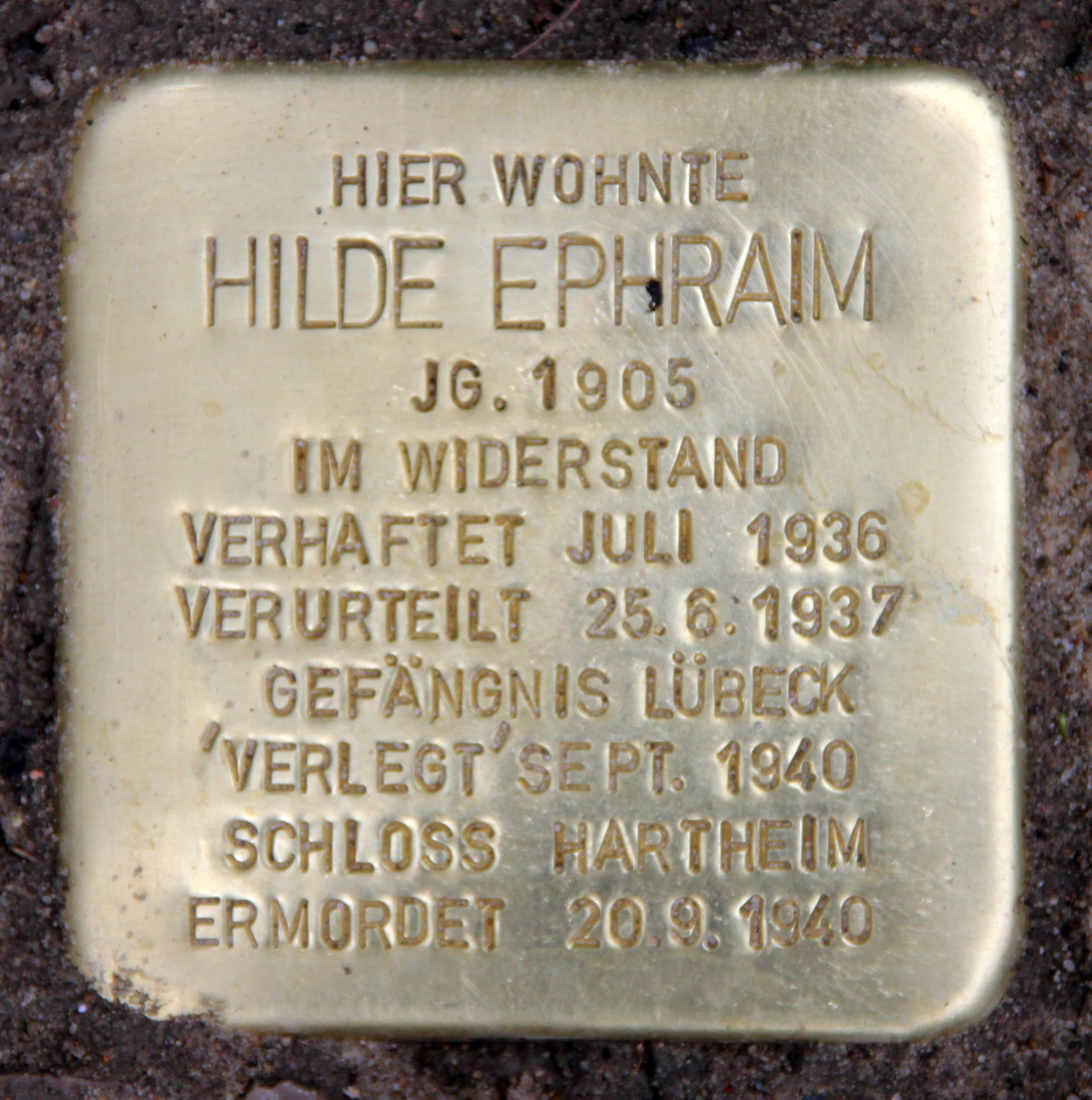
A "Stolperstein" (memorial tablet) has been set in the ground outside the address at Bayerische Straße 20 in Berlin-Wilmersdorf where Hilde Ephraim lived.

Ephraim did not take well to life in prison. She may have been subjected to further physical mistreatment. At least once she refused to eat, becoming very weak and confused. Elise Tiel (1915-2005) was able to visit her, for the last time, in August 1940 at a detention centre near Munich. Tiel later reported that she had no longer been able to recognise her friend. By this time Ephraim was so physically wasted that she was classified as "no longer fit to be transported" ("nicht mehr transportfähig"). Nevertheless, the next month she was transported, in the context of the infamous "Aktion T4" programme, to the Hartheim Killing facility (sometimes translated in English as the "Hartheim Euthanasia Centre") in Hartheim Castle near Linz. Here she was killed on 20 September 1940. Surviving files show that in order to conceal the precise circumstances of her death, her family were wrongly informed that she had died in far away Chelm. Because of this, some subsequent sources, relying on official documents from the Nazi period, still give the place of her death as Chelm.
