= Overman =

Overman may refer to:

== Entertainment ==
- Overman (film), a 2015 South Korean film
- Overman King Gainer, a Japanese anime television series
- Overman, an alternative version of Superman in DC Comics
- Overman, a Brazilian superhero created by Laerte Coutinho

== Other uses ==
- Overman (surname)
- Friedrich Nietzsche's concept of the Übermensch, occasionally translated "Overman" (as opposed to, e.g., "Superman")
- A supervisor, especially in the coal mining industry
- Overman Act, an American law that increased presidential power during World War I
- Overman Committee, a subcommittee of the United States Senate Committee on the Judiciary
- Overman rearrangement, a chemical reaction
- Overman Wheel Company, an American bicycle manufacturer
