= Socialist Workers' Party of Germany =

Socialist Workers' Party of Germany Sozialistische Arbeiterpartei Deutschlands
- Leader: Kurt Rosenfeld; Max Seydewitz; Heinrich Ströbel
- Founded: 1931; 95 years ago
- Banned: 1933; 93 years ago
- Merger of: KPD-O (1932); USPD
- Split from: SPD
- Headquarters: Berlin, Weimar Republic
- Newspaper: Sozialistische Arbeiter-Zeitung
- Youth wing: Socialist Youth League of Germany
- Paramilitary: Sozialistischer Schutzbund
- Membership: 25,000 (1931); 15,600 (1933)
- Ideology: Centrist Marxism; Democratic socialism
- Political position: Left-wing
- International affiliation: International Revolutionary Marxist Centre
- Colours: Red

The Socialist Workers' Party of Germany (German: Sozialistische Arbeiterpartei Deutschlands, SAPD, sometimes called simply the Sozialistische Arbeiterpartei, SAP) was a centrist Marxist political party in Germany. It was formed as a left-wing party with around 20,000 members who split off from the SPD in the autumn of 1931. In 1931, the remnants of the USPD merged into the party and in 1932 some Communist Party dissenters also joined the group as well as a part of the Communist Party Opposition. Nevertheless, SAPD membership remained small. From 1933, the group's members worked illegally against Nazism.

== History ==
=== 1931–1933 ===
The Socialist Workers' Party of Germany (SAPD) emerged as a left-wing splinter of the SPD in the autumn of 1931. It was formed when six members of the SPD Reichstag faction (Kurt Rosenfeld, Max Seydewitz, August Siemsen, Heinrich Ströbel, Hans Ziegler and Andreas Portune) were expelled for breaking party discipline. The newly-founded party was joined by other SPD left-wingers (including some well-known politicians such as Anna Siemsen and Käte Frankenthal), its youth association, the SAJ, a part of the KPO around Paul Frölich, Jacob Walcher, August Enderle, August Ziehl and Heinrich Galm, some groups and individuals from the conciliator faction of the KPD such as Heinrich Stahmer, the remaining USPD around Theodor Liebknecht, the Socialist League of Georg Ledebour, the Working Group for Left Socialist Politics around Fritz Küster, an entryist group of the Red Fighters around Bernhard Reichenbach (expelled in 1932) as well as well-known independent Marxist intellectuals such as Fritz Sternberg.

The SAPD was largely unable to achieve a breakthrough at the electoral level. It won state parliament seats in Hesse and city and district council seats in its municipal strongholds of Offenbach, Geesthacht, Breslau, Dresden, Zwickau and, above all, some smaller communities in the Vogtland; in the Vogtland village of Morgenröthe-Rautenkranz, the party received an absolute majority of votes and seats in the municipal elections on 13 November 1932. It did not succeed in attracting independent leftists or critical SPD and KPD members.

The SAPD vehemently advocated a united front of the SPD, KPD, trade unions and other mass organizations of the workers' movement against fascism; this was not successful due to the rejection of this strategy by the leading party bureaucracies. Together with the KPO and the Lenin League, the SAPD held a series of anti-fascist rallies and discussion events at which the idea of a united front was propagated.

At the beginning of 1933, factional disputes within the SAPD came to a head when the majority of the executive committee around Rosenfeld and Seydewitz advocated a dissolution of the party in favour of the SPD and KPD. The left wing opposed this and, already under illegal conditions, held a party conference at which a new executive committee was elected. Barely a tenth of the then 15,600 members supported the right wing's call for dissolution. The background to this dispute was the dissatisfaction of a majority of members with the moderate left-wing social democratic and pacifist course of the party leadership and former Reichstag deputies. The SAPD left (around the former KPO members Fröhlich and Walcher, the intellectuals Sternberg and Klaus Zweiling and the leadership of the SJVD) sought to build a new revolutionary party and a new communist international. In this context, the SAPD belonged to the London Bureau, an alliance of left-wing socialist and independent communist parties such as the POUM, the British ILP and the Dutch RSP and OSP, and in 1934 conducted merger negotiations with Leon Trotsky's International Communist League. The SAPD was also affiliated to the International Revolutionary Marxist Centre, but it broke with the main party of that international (the Independent Labour Party) over the question of the united front and popular front.

The SAPD published the daily newspaper Sozialistische Arbeiter-Zeitung, the weekly newspaper Die Fackel, several regional newspapers such as Kampfsignal (Berlin), and the previous theoretical organ of the SPD left, Der Klassenkampf. Young members and sympathizers of the SAPD joined together to form the Socialist Youth Association (SJVD), which had around 8,000 to 10,000 members (the SAPD had around 25,000 at its peak). The SAPD exerted a certain influence on the pacifist German Peace Society (DFG), especially since its executive chairman Fritz Küster was also a member of the SAPD board, and in various cultural organizations of the labor movement (Freidenker, Arbeitersportbewegung). The SAPD's influence in the unions remained rather moderate. The party had its headquarters in Berlin-Mitte on Schillingstrasse.

=== Exile and illegality ===
From 1933 onwards, the SAPD's members worked illegally against the Nazis. Over half of the party's membership took part in the resistance, a much higher proportion than in the SPD and KPD. In Berlin, there was close cooperation between members of the SAPD and the left-wing socialist Red Shock Troop, which at the time had up to 500 members. This resulted in an official "fighting alliance", which was announced on July 18, 1933 in the SAPD leaflet "Information from Politics and Economy". Together, both groups planned the "renewal of the workers' movement on the basis of revolutionary principles". The alliance became largely ineffective at the end of 1933 and beginning of 1934 due to mass arrests in Berlin resistance circles. Many SAPD members, especially those known to the public, emigrated; many of those who remained in Germany were locked up in prisons or concentration camps; some, such as Ernst Eckstein and Franz Bobzien, were murdered. After most of the SAPD structures had been broken up in 1937 and 1938, only smaller groups and circles remained, which continued to be active (some until the end of the war in 1945).

In exile (the exiled executive was in Paris), the SAPD took part in the Lutetia Circle, an attempt to find a German popular front. Members of the party fought during the Spanish Civil War in the workers' militia of the POUM, in the Rovira unit. A relief fund, the Ernst Eckstein Fund, was set up to support comrades in need or who had been captured. In 1937, a group of members led by Erwin Ackerknecht, Walter Fabian and Peter Blachstein were expelled from the party after they had criticized the SAPD's overly uncritical stance towards the KPD and the Moscow Trials. The expelled members formed the Neuer Weg group. In 1939, the contacts between exile and underground groups largely broke down due to the outbreak of the Second World War; the exile structures themselves showed tendencies towards disintegration (among other things, the exile leadership broke up into rival groups around Walcher and Frölich), while the still active groups in Sweden (which still maintained individual contacts with members in northern Germany) and Great Britain (which had already joined the Union of German Socialist Organisations in Great Britain in 1941) moved closer to the SPD again. As a result, the SAPD was not re-founded after the end of the war.

=== Postwar ===
After the end of the war in 1945, most members of the SAPD in the western zones joined the SPD after a discussion between the later SPD chairman Kurt Schumacher (operating from his office in the Linden-Mitte district of Hanover) and Otto Brenner, representing the SAPD. Others, especially in the Soviet zone, also joined the KPD or later the SED, such as Klaus Zweiling, Jacob Walcher, Max Seydewitz and Edith Baumann. Attempts to re-establish a decidedly left-wing socialist party at local level, such as the Workers' Party (AP) under Heinrich Galm in Offenbach or the SAP under August Ziehl in Geesthacht, failed. Some former SAPD members, such as Fritz Lamm, played an important role in the independent radical left of the 1950s and 1960s, while others joined the Workers' Politics Group, which followed in the tradition of the KPO.

=== Willy Brandt and the SAPD ===
In his home town of Lübeck, the young Herbert Karl Frahm, later known as Willy Brandt, joined the SAPD against the advice of his mentor Julius Leber. In his autobiography, Brandt wrote:

In autumn 1931, Nazis and German nationalists, the SA and Der Stahlhelm joined together to form the "Harzburg Front". [...] It was just at this time that the left wing of the social democrats split off, as a result of measures connected to organisation and discipline by the party leaders. A few Reichstag assemblymen, a number of active party groups – above all in Saxony – and not least a large proportion of young Socialists followed the people who were calling for the founding of a Socialist Workers' Party.

In 1934, the youth of SAPD took part in the foundation of the International Bureau of Revolutionary Youth Organizations. The congress was held in the Netherlands and broken up by Dutch police. Several SAPD delegates were handed over to German authorities. The congress then re-convened in Lille. Brandt was elected to the Secretariat of the organization and worked in Norway for the Bureau.

Willy Brandt eventually became the leader of the SPD, one of West Germany's major political parties of the modern era, being elected Chancellor of Germany in 1969.

== Notable members ==
=== Party leaders ===
- Kurt Rosenfeld (September 1931 – March 1933)
- Max Seydewitz (September 1931 – March 1933)
- Heinrich Ströbel (September 1931 – December 1931)
- Jacob Walcher (after March 1933)

=== Reichstag deputies ===
- Andreas Portune
- Kurt Rosenfeld
- Max Seydewitz
- August Siemsen
- Heinrich Ströbel
- Hans Ziegler
- Paul Frölich (former)
- Georg Ledebour (former)
- Anna Siemsen (former)

=== Landtag deputies ===
- Käte Frankenthal
- Heinrich Galm
- Hermann Gebhardt
- Hans Marckwald
- Theodor Liebknecht (former)
- Heinrich Stahmer (former)
- Rosi Wolfstein (former)
- August Ziehl (former)

=== Intellectuals ===
- Walter Fabian
- Hans Mayer
- Fritz Sternberg
- Klaus Zweiling

=== Journalists ===
- Herbert Frahm (later changed his name to Willy Brandt)
- Maria Grollmuß
- Fritz Küster
- Bernhard Reichenbach
- Stefan Szende

=== Trade unionists ===
- Otto Brenner
- August Enderle
- Irmgard Enderle
- Jacob Walcher

=== Youth leaders ===
- Edith Baumann
- Peter Blachstein
- Franz Bobzien
- Fritz Lamm

=== Other members ===
- Erwin Ackerknecht
- Willi Birkelbach
- Gustav Böhrnsen
- Ernst Eckstein
- Ella Ehlers
- Hilde Ephraim
- Erna Lang
- Karl Obermann
- Ruth Oesterreich
- Richard Paulick
- Paul Wessel

== See also ==
- Sozialistische Arbeiter-Zeitung
- Sozialistischer Schutzbund (Socialist Protection League)

== Bibliography ==
- Drechslaer, Hanno (1963). Die Sozialistische Arbeiterpartei Deutschlands (SAPD): Ein Beitrag zur Geschichte der Deutschen Arbeiterbewegung am Ende der Weimarer Republik [The Socialist Workers' Party of Germany (SAPD): A contribution to the history of the German workers' movement at the end of the Weimar Republic] (in German). Meisenheim am Glan: Hain. Repr. Hannover: Politladen, 1971; 2. Repr. Hamburg: Junius, 1999 (the classic account).
