= Theodor Liebknecht =

German socialist politician

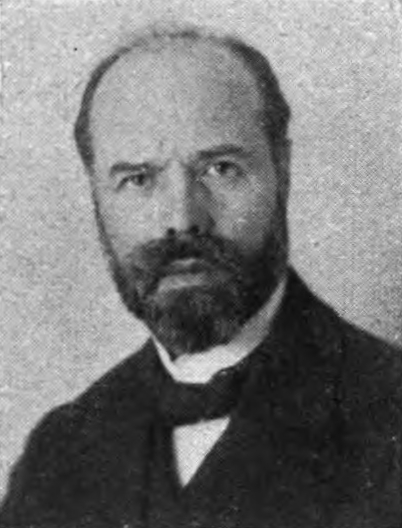
- Liebknecht c. 1921

Member of the Landtag of Prussia
- In office 1921–1924

Personal details
- Born: 19 April 1870 Leipzig, Kingdom of Saxony
- Died: 6 January 1948 (aged 77) Brome, Germany
- Resting place: Stadtfriedhof Engesohde, Hannover
- Party: SAPD (1931–1933); USPD (before 1931)
- Parent: Wilhelm Liebknecht
- Relatives: Karl Liebknecht (brother)

Theodor Karl Ernst Adolf Liebknecht (19 April 1870 – 6 January 1948) was a German socialist politician and activist.

== Biography ==
Born in Leipzig in 1870 as the son of Wilhelm Liebknecht and the brother of Karl Liebknecht, Theodor Liebknecht studied law and worked, together with his brother Karl and Oskar Cohn, as a lawyer in Berlin from 1899 on, becoming politically active after his brother's murder in January 1919.

Liebknecht was a member of the Independent Social Democratic Party of Germany (USPD), opposed to the merger with the KPD and the joining of the Comintern but also to the reunification of the party with the SPD, he continued the USPD as an independent party with Georg Ledebour until its merger into the Sozialistische Arbeiterpartei Deutschlands (SAPD, "Socialist Workers' Party of Germany") in 1931.

In 1922 he accompanied Kurt Rosenfeld, Emile Vandervelde and Arthur Wauter as foreign socialist lawyers who participated in the defence of the Socialist Revolutionaries in the 1922 Moscow Trial of Socialist Revolutionaries.

In 1924, he was involved in the split of the Sozialistischer Bund together with Georg Ledebour.

A right-wing member of the SAPD, he was opposed to the introduction of Leninist schemes of organization into the party. Following the Nazi rise to power, he emigrated to Basel, Switzerland in 1933 and was later employed by the International Institute of Social History in Amsterdam from 1936 to 1939. He was a supporter of the 2½ International.

Liebknecht died in Altendorf, Brome, Germany, in 1948.
