= Workers Party (Socialist Unity Party) =

Political party in West Germany

Workers Party poster

The Workers Party (Socialist Unity Party) (German: Arbeiter-Partei (Sozialistische Einheitspartei)) was a political party in West Germany. The party was founded in Offenbach in the autumn of 1945. The party sought to profile itself as a third alternative to the Social Democratic Party of Germany (SPD) or the Communist Party of Germany (KPD). Between 1946 and 1947 the party expanded to other towns in Hessen. The party gathered former members of the Communist Party of Germany (Opposition) (KPO) and the Socialist Workers Party (SAP). Heinrich Galm was the chairman of the party, former chair of the KPD branch of Offenbach and former leader of KPO and SAP. Another key leader was Philipp Pless, party secretary and chair of the Frankfurt branch.

The party won 1.5% in the April 1946 Hessen local elections. In the subsequent Hessen regional assembly election, the party fielded candidates in 39 constituencies, obtaining 0.6% of the votes. In Offenbach, it obtained 15.8% of the votes. In Frankfurt, it obtained 0.6%.

The first regional assembly of the party was held on 18 August 1946, with 61 delegates representing 23 towns in Hessen and 4 towns in other parts of the country. The assembly voted to remove "Socialist Unity Party" from the name of the party. In 1946 a Workers Party group was formed in Baden-Württemberg by merging ex-KPO and ex-SAP members, which registered itself as a political party in 1947. On 18 October 1947 the party held its first public meeting in Stuttgart. It obtained 2% of the votes in the Stuttgart local elections of December 1947. A Bremen Workers Party was also formed.

In 1951 a number of local politicians in Offenbach left the party for SPD. The remainder, including Galm, joined SPD in 1954.
