= Käte Frankenthal =

German-American physician and politician

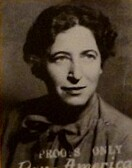
Käte Frankenthal

Käte Frankenthal (German pronunciation: [ˈkɛːtə ˈfʁaŋkn̩taːl]; 30 January 1889 – 21 April 1976) was a German physician and politician. After receiving a doctorate in 1914, she worked at a hospital in Berlin, before leaving to become a doctor in a small town. After the outbreak of World War I, Frankenthal attempted to enlist in the German Army as a doctor, but was rejected due to her gender. She subsequently joined the Austro-Hungarian Army, where she served in the Carpathian Mountains and on the Balkan front. After the war she worked at the Charité hospital, but was dismissed to make room for male veterans.

In addition to her work in medicine, Frankenthal was active in politics as a member of the Social Democratic Party of Germany. From 1925 to 1931 she served on the Berlin City Council, and in 1930 was elected to the Prussian Landtag. In 1931 she joined the Socialist Workers' Party of Germany, and briefly held a leadership role in the party. Following the ascension of Adolf Hitler, Frankenthal fled Germany, eventually settling in New York City in the United States. While in New York she penned an essay about her experiences as a Jew and a political activist in Germany, and worked with a New York-based, Germany-focused advocacy organization, the Council for a Democratic Germany. Although she traveled to Germany after the war, and was honored by the city of Berlin in 1974, she remained a resident of New York for the remainder of her life.

== Personal life ==
Frankenthal was born in Kiel, Germany, to Julius and Cäcilie (née Goldmann) Frankenthal on 30 January 1889. She was the second of three daughters. Julius was a successful businessman and leader in Kiel's Jewish community and Cäcilie was a housewife. Though she was raised in a middle class household, Frankenthal rejected the lifestyle and values of her parents.

Frankenthal attended a Kiel girls' school and then a Jewish boarding school in Wiesbaden where she had both Jewish and gentile friends. She later complained that the girls' schools of the time provided a "rather primitive general education."

Though the boarding school emphasized learning social graces to attract a husband, Frankenthal instead prepared herself to attend university and then medical school. She wished to be self-sufficient and independent. Though her parents opposed it, she hired private tutors to help her prepare for the entrance exams and attended "cram courses" that were offered to women in Berlin.

After the death of her parents, Frankenthal formally left the Jewish community in 1923, declaring herself to be konfessionslos, or without religion. She considered herself to be Jewish "by fate, but not by religion or nationality." At an early age she decided never to marry. She rejected the possibility of marrying a gentile, and said she was "turned off by anything Jewish in appearance or manner," including Jewish men.

She was a large, physically imposing woman with short hair and a masculine bearing who often wore men's clothes. A very private, independent person, she had no close friends as an adult, though in her college days she did have close friendships with a number of non-Jewish men. She also had sexual partners during this time, which was rare for female students of the era.

== Education ==
At the age of 20, Frankenthal passed her Abitur examination and enrolled at the University of Kiel. She also studied in Heidelberg, Erlangen, Munich, and Vienna. In all, she attended six universities over ten semesters. Finally, in 1914, she earned her doctorate in Freiberg.

Until she arrived in Heidelberg in 1910, she did not live the same carefree lifestyle as many of her classmates. Previously, she had lived at home with her parents. When she first arrived in the city, her father rented her a two-bedroom apartment. Frankenthal objected, saying students typically only had a single-room apartment and that she did not to wish to waste her father's money. Julius insisted, however, rejecting the notion that she might entertain male students in her bedroom. This was the last time that Julius attempted to influence his daughter's moral behavior. She enjoyed the freedom the city provided to young students like herself, and thought the college town was the ideal place to grow into an adult.

When she first matriculated, female students were uncommon in Kiel. They made up between 10 and 15% of the student body by the time she completed her studies, however. She reported that fellow students were more accepting of her as a woman than the professors were. In the years she was studying, 1909 to 1914, the acceptance of women on campus improved dramatically.

An enthusiastic sportswoman and equestrian, Frankenthal studied fencing, boxing, and ju-jitsu in order to prove that she was physically capable to defend herself against a man.

== Medical career ==
After medical school, Frankenthal became a resident at a large hospital in Berlin. After a rural doctor was drafted into the army, Frankenthal took his position as it offered her a chance to make more money. The small town where she resided was surprised to see not only a female doctor, but especially a woman who smoked cigars and drank whiskey. With no other doctors available, she saw both men and women as patients.

Frankenthal volunteered to serve in the German Army during World War I, but the army did not accept female doctors. She then applied to the Austrian Army and was accepted, though she was the only woman in the barracks. She served in the Carpathian Mountains and later on the Balkan front. As the war came to an end, Frankenthal returned to Berlin. She took an unpaid research assistant position at the Institute for Cancer Research. She also worked as a resident, directing a women's ward of a hospital. She also treated tuberculosis patients.

As an active member of the Social Democratic Party of Germany, she had charge of a first aid station operating under the auspices of the Red Cross during the November Revolution. In 1924, Frankenthal and other women were dismissed from their positions as doctors at the Charité so that male war veterans could take their place. She then established a private practice while continuing to conduct research at the Pathological Institute and to practice medicine at the University Women's Clinic.

Frankenthal became the municipal physician in Neukölln in 1928.

== Political career ==
Frankenthal was first introduced to socialism while a student in Heidelberg. She became politically active on women's issues, campaigning for sex reform legislation, legalizing abortion, and the creation of marital counselling bureaus that offered birth control and sex education. She was active in both the Federation of Women Physicians and the Association of Socialist Physicians in Germany, roles that gave her a platform from which she could put pressure on male and non-Jewish doctors to amend the German constitution to legalize abortion. Frankenthal also supported legalizing homosexuality.

From 1925 to 1931, Frankenthal served on the Berlin City Council as a Social Democratic municipal deputy representing Tiergarten. In 1930, she was elected to the Prussian Landtag. The following year, in 1931, she left the Social Democratic party to become a member of the Socialist Workers' Party of Germany, a party even further to the left. She served, for a short period of time, on the party's executive board.

== Life in the United States ==
After Adolf Hitler came to power in January 1933, Frankenthal, a Jewish socialist, quickly left Germany. Had she stayed, she likely would have arrested for her political activities. Frankenthal first fled to Prague before moving to Switzerland and then Paris. In 1936, she moved to New York City.

Before requalifying as a doctor in New York, Frankenthal struggled to adjust to her new life and to support herself. She took jobs selling ice cream bars on the streets and going door-to-door selling stockings. Eventually, she gained her credentials to practice in the United States and trained as a psychoanalyst. In addition to working with the Jewish Family Service, Frankenthal specialized in marriage and family therapy in her private psychoanalytic practice.

Her prize-winning memoir, Der dreifache Fluch: Jüdin, Intellektuelle, Sozialistin (The triple curse: Jewish, intellectual, socialist), was written in 1940 as part of an essay contest sponsored by Harvard University about life in Germany before and after 1933. The contest was held to create an academic collection of materials to study the effects, both social and psychological, of national socialism on both German society and the German people. In it she discusses her Judaism, political activity during the Weimar Republic, her first years living in the United States. It was published in 1981.

She never fully assimilated into American life and often traveled back to Germany after the end of World War II, but lived in New York for the rest of her life. The German government awarded her reparations and a pension after the war, and she was honored by the City of Berlin on her 85th birthday.

In 1944 and 1945, she worked for the Council for a Democratic Germany and was responsible for the portion of their memorandum that focused on health policy along with Felix Boenheim and Kurt Glaser.

Frankenthal died of arteriosclerosis in New York on 21 April 1976.

== Publications ==
- Houghton Library, Harvard University, Boston, MA, 57M-203, bMS Ger91, Käte Frankenthal, #67
- Der dreifache Fluch: Jüdin, Intellektuelle, Sozialistin. Edited by Kathleen M. Pearle and Stephan Leibfried. Frankfurt: 1981
- "Berlin, 1933" and "Paris-Switzerland-Prague." In Mark M. Anderson, ed., Hitler's Exiles. New York: 1998, 28–34 and 137–145
- "Ärtzeschaft und Faschismus." In Der sozialistische Arzt 8 (1932)
- A Democratic System of Public Health for Germany. New York, 1945
- "The Role of Sex in Modern Society." Psychiatry 8 (1945): 19–25
- Background for Tomorrow. New York: 1953
- "Women in Industry—Its Effects on Family Health." Acta Medica et Sociologica I, 1–3 (1962): 313–320
- "Autohypnosis and Other Aids for Survival in Situations of Extreme Stress." International Journal of Clinical and Experimental Hypnosis 17 (1969), 153–159.

== Works cited ==
- Pickus, Keith (1 December 2017). Constructing Modern Identities: Jewish University Students in Germany, 1815-1914. Wayne State University Press. ISBN 978-0-8143-4351-7.
- Quack, Sibylle (7 November 2002). Between Sorrow and Strength: Women Refugees of the Nazi Period. Cambridge University Press. ISBN 978-0-521-52285-4.
- Greenspahn, Frederick E. (November 2009). Women and Judaism: New Insights and Scholarship. NYU Press. ISBN 978-0-8147-3218-2.
- Albisetti, James C. (14 July 2014). Schooling German Girls and Women. Princeton University Press. ISBN 978-1-4008-5979-5.
