= Overman (surname) =

Overman is a surname. Notable people with the surname include:

- Albert H. Overman (1850–1930), American bicycle manufacturer and founder of Overman Wheel Company
- Ion Overman, American actress
- Howard Overman, British screenwriter
- Larry E. Overman, American chemist
- Lee Slater Overman, former U.S. senator
