= Fritz Sternberg =

German economist, sociologist, Marxist theorist and socialist politician

Friedrich "Fritz" Sternberg (11 June 1895 – 18 October 1963) was a German economist, sociologist, Marxist theorist, and socialist politician. Bertolt Brecht declared Sternberg to be his "first teacher."

== Works ==
- Die Juden als Träger einer neuen Wirtschaft in Palästina. Eine Studie. Vienna 1921.
- Der Imperialismus. Berlin 1926.
- Der Imperialismus und seine Kritiker. Berlin 1929.
- Eine Umwälzung der Wissenschaft? Kritik des Buches von Henryk Großmann: Das Akkumulations- und Zusammenbruchgesetz des kapitalistischen Systems. Zugleich eine positive Analyse des Imperialismus. Berlin 1930
- Der Niedergang des deutschen Kapitalismus. Berlin 1932.
- Der Faschismus an der Macht. Amsterdam 1935.
- Germany and a Lightning War. London 1938.
- From Nazi Sources. Why Hitler can't win. New York/Toronto 1939.
- Die deutsche Kriegsstärke. Wie lange kann Hitler Krieg führen. Paris 1939.
- The coming Crisis. New York/Toronto 1947.
- How to stop the Russians without war. New York/Toronto 1948.
- Living with the Crisis. The Battle against Depression and War. New York 1949.
- Capitalism and Socialism on Trial. New York 1951.
- The End of a Revolution. Soviet Russia - From Revolution to Reaction. New York 1953.
- Marx und die Gegenwart. Entwicklungstendenzen in der zweiten Hälfte des zwanzigsten Jahrhunderts. Cologne 1955.
- Die militärische und die industrielle Revolution. Berlin/Frankfurt am Main 1959.
- Wer beherrscht die zweite Hälfte des 20. Jahrhunderts? Cologne/Berlin 1961.
- Der Dichter und die Ratio. Erinnerungen an Bertolt Brecht. Göttingen 1963.
- Anmerkungen zu Marx - heute. Frankfurt am Main 1965.

== Bibliography ==
- Grebing, Helga (ed.). Fritz Sternberg: Für die Zukunft des Sozialismus (Schriftenreihe der Otto Brenner Stiftung Nr. 23), Frankfurt am Main 1981.
