= Anna Ziegler (politician) =

German politician

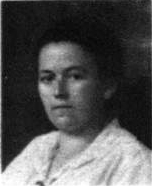
Ziegler c. 1920

Anna Ziegler (née Strauß, 10 June 1882 – 27 December 1942) was a German politician, and a member of the Reichstag during the Weimar Republic.

== Life ==
Anna Strauß was born in 1882 in Backnang, then part of the Kingdom of Württemberg. She married Hans Ziegler, who would later go on to become the mayor of Nuremberg, in 1905. They lived in Heilbronn. She completed an apprenticeship as a tailor.

In 1906, Ziegler joined the Social Democratic Party of Germany (SPD). When the Independent Social Democratic Party of Germany (USPD) split from the SPD, Ziegler went with them. In 1922 however, she returned to the SPD.

When women's suffrage was introduced in Germany in May 1919, Ziegler was elected to the city council of Heilbronn. She was also elected to the Reichstag for the USPD in 1920. She was one of 37 women in the parliament at that time.

Ziegler's marriage was divorced in 1924, she ended her political career shortly afterwards. In 1938 she moved to Schwäbisch Hall, and re-assumed her birth name in June 1939. She died there in 1942.
