= Karl Obermann =

German historian (1905–1987)

Karl Obermann (22 September 1905 – 10 July 1987) was a German historian. He became the first director of the Historical Institute of the (East) German Academy of Sciences and Humanities.

== Life ==
Karl Obermann was born in Cologne. His father was a factory worker. There was no money for him to progress to a university level education so after leaving secondary school he undertook an apprenticeship in technical drawing. Obermann became unemployed in 1928. He was able to attend lectures at the university in Sociology and Economic History as a "guest attendee". During this time he was supporting himself, at least in part, through freelance journalism.

Obermann discovered the young socialist movement through the "Wandervogel" hiking clubs. Sources are not unanimous on the date, but it seems most likely that following several year as an active member of the Young Socialists, it was in 1931, by now aged 23, that he joined the Social Democratic Party ("Sozialdemokratische Partei Deutschlands" / SPD). Two years later he switched to the newly formed Socialist Workers' Party ("Sozialistische Arbeiterpartei Deutschlands" / SAPD), which had been formed by SPD members who had become convinced that the best chance of reversing the surge in support for nationalist populism lay in uniting the SPD and the Communist Party. That aspiration failed spectacularly. In January 1933 the Nazis took power and lost no time in transforming the country into a one-party dictatorship. The SAPD never became more than a minority leftwing fringe group which fizzled out after 1945. With the Nazis in power, people with a political past were persecuted and in many cases arrested. Others fled. In 1933 Karl Obermann emigrated via Belgium to Paris which was rapidly becoming a focus for growing numbers of exiled German communists and other left-wing activists.

In Paris during the 1930s Obermann was able to work as a free-lance journalist for various German language newspapers and magazines, reflecting the number of German political exiles living in the city. He published a few historical essays. He also took the opportunity to attend lectures on History at the Sorbonne - again, as a "guest attendee" rather than as a student of the university. He joined the exiled Communist Party of Germany in 1936. War was declared in September 1939. Like many German political exiles, Karl Obermann was arrested and interred at Camp Vernet in the far southwest of the country. The camp had been created a couple of years earlier as a transit camp for left-wing fighters returning defeated from the Spanish Civil War and in 1940, though conditions were very basic, it was initially more a holding camp for "political undesirables" - many of them Jewish, reflecting the number of Jews among the German political exiles community that had settled in Paris - than the secure concentration camp it later became. Whether he was formally released or simply walked out of the camp gates, in 1941 Obermann managed to escape from France to the United States. He was able to do this on a ship sailing from Marseille, a well worn channel for German refugees, not yet fully closed off by the French authorities, which avoided the visa issues involved in trecking across Spain and Portugal.

In the USA he came into contact with the "Council for a Democratic Germany" and became a contributing editor to the council's antifascist news magazine "The German American" between 1943 and 1946. In October 1946 he returned to Germany, travelling via the Soviet Union and arriving in the central part of Germany that had been administered, since May 1945, as the Soviet occupation zone. Early on he became a member of the Socialist Unity Party ("Sozialistische Einheitspartei Deutschlands" / SED) which had been created under contentious circumstances in April 1946 and which, by the time the Soviet occupation zone was relaunched as the Soviet sponsored German Democratic Republic in October 1949, was emerging as the ruling party in a new kind of German one-party dictatorship. Between 1947 and 1949 he was a contributing editor of the university news magazine, "Forum". He combined this with study at what came to be known, in 1949, as the Humboldt University of Berlin. Again, his subject was History.

In 1950 he received his doctorate from the Humboldt. His dissertation topic was the German revolution of 1848. Between 1950 and 1952 he taught at the Brandenburg State Academy in Potsdam. Just two years after receiving his doctorate he received his habilitation (higher academic qualification) which opened the way for a career as a university academic. His subject, this time, was the relations between the United States and Germany during what had come to be known as the Weimar period. In 1953 he was appointed to a fell teaching professorship at the Humboldt University. Further promotion followed in 1956: between 1956 and 1970 he served as a full professor ordinarius with a teaching chair, still at the Humboldt in Berlin, where in 1956 he was also appointed the first director of the newly formed Historical Institute of the (East) German Academy of Sciences and Humanities. He held that directorship till 1960. Additionally, between 1956 and 1970 he headed the "1789–1871" department.

Karl Obermann retired in 1970 and died in Berlin in 1987.

Karl Obermann belonged to the German Democratic Republic's first generation of Marxist-Leninist historians. The focus of his work was on the history of Germany during the nineteenth century, and within that century he imputed particular importance to the defining events of 1848. He belonged to numerous national and international academic committees, notably of the East German Historical Association.

== Awards and honours ==
- 1961 National Prize of the German Democratic Republic
- 1965 Medal of Honour from the Czechoslovak Academy of Sciences
- 1975 Patriotic Order of Merit
- 1985 Star of People's Friendship

== Publications (not necessarily a complete list) ==
- Joseph Weydemeyer: Pioneer of American Socialism. International Publishers, New York 1947.
- Einheit und Freiheit. Die deutsche Geschichte von 1815 bis 1849 in zeitgenössischen Dokumenten. Dietz, Berlin 1950.
- Die deutschen Arbeiter in der ersten bürgerlichen Revolution. Dietz, Berlin 1950 (2nd edition, 1953).
- Die Beziehungen des amerikanischen Imperialismus zum deutschen Imperialismus in der Zeit der Weimarer Republik (1918–1925). Rütten & Loening, Berlin 1952.
- Zur Geschichte des Bundes der Kommunisten 1849 bis 1852. Dietz, Berlin 1952.
- Joseph Weydemeyer. Ein Lebensbild. 1818–1866. Dietz, Berlin 1968.
- Flugblätter der Revolution. Eine Flugblattsammlung von 1848/49 in Deutschland. Verlag der Wissenschaften, Berlin 1970.
- (together with Benczédi László; compiler-editors): Die Ungarische Revolution von 1848/49 und die demokratische Bewegung in Deutschland. Akadémiai Kiadó, Budapest 1971.
- Heinrich Billstein: Marx in Köln. Mit einem Beitrag von Karl Obermann. Pahl-Rugenstein, Köln 1983 ISBN 3-7609-0766-0 (Kleine Bibliothek 287), pp. 138–218
- Exil Paris. Im Kampf gegen Kultur- und Bildungsabbau im faschistischen Deutschland (1933–1939). Deutscher Verlag der Wissenschaften, Berlin 1984.
- Die Wahlen zur Frankfurter Nationalversammlung im Frühjahr 1848. Die Wahlvorgänge in den Staaten des Deutschen Bundes im Spiegel zeitgenössischer Quellen. Deutscher Verlag der Wissenschaften, Berlin 1987.
