= Georg Ledebour =

German socialist politician and journalist

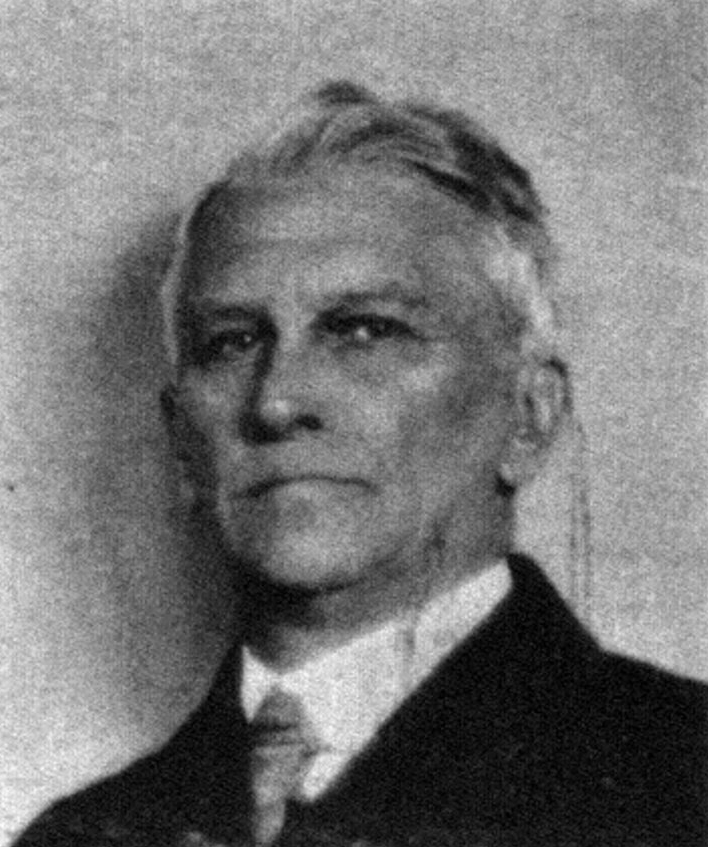
- Ledebour c. 1920

Member of the Reichstag
- In office 24 June 1920 – 27 May 1924
- Preceded by: Constituency established
- Succeeded by: Multi-member district
- Constituency: Berlin
- In office 7 August 1900 – 9 November 1918
- Preceded by: Wilhelm Liebknecht
- Succeeded by: Constituency abolished
- Constituency: Berlin 6

Personal details
- Born: March 7, 1850 Hanover, Kingdom of Hanover
- Died: March 31, 1947 (aged 97) Bern, Switzerland
- Party: DFP (1882–1891); SPD (1891–1917); USPD (1917–1931); SAPD (1931–1933)
- Other political affiliations: SAG (1915–1917)

Georg Ledebour (7 March 1850 – 31 March 1947) was a German socialist politician and journalist.

== Biography ==
He served as a stretcher bearer in the Franco-Prussian War of 1870. He worked as a journalist on several newspapers after 1875. He joined the German Progress Party in 1882 and the Social Democratic Party of Germany (SPD) in 1891.

He had a romantic relationship with Lou Andreas-Salome between 1892 and 1894. During that period, Ledebour was sentenced and jailed for a year for a political offence.

Ledebour was a member of the German Reichstag from 1900 until 1918. He took part in the international anti-war socialist conferences at Zimmerwald in 1915, and in Stockholm in 1917. He was one of the leaders of the German Independent Social Democratic Party (USPD) after the split in the SPD in 1917. The Majority Social Democratic Party of Germany (MSPD) broadly supported the German government's war aims, and the USPD was opposed to the government.

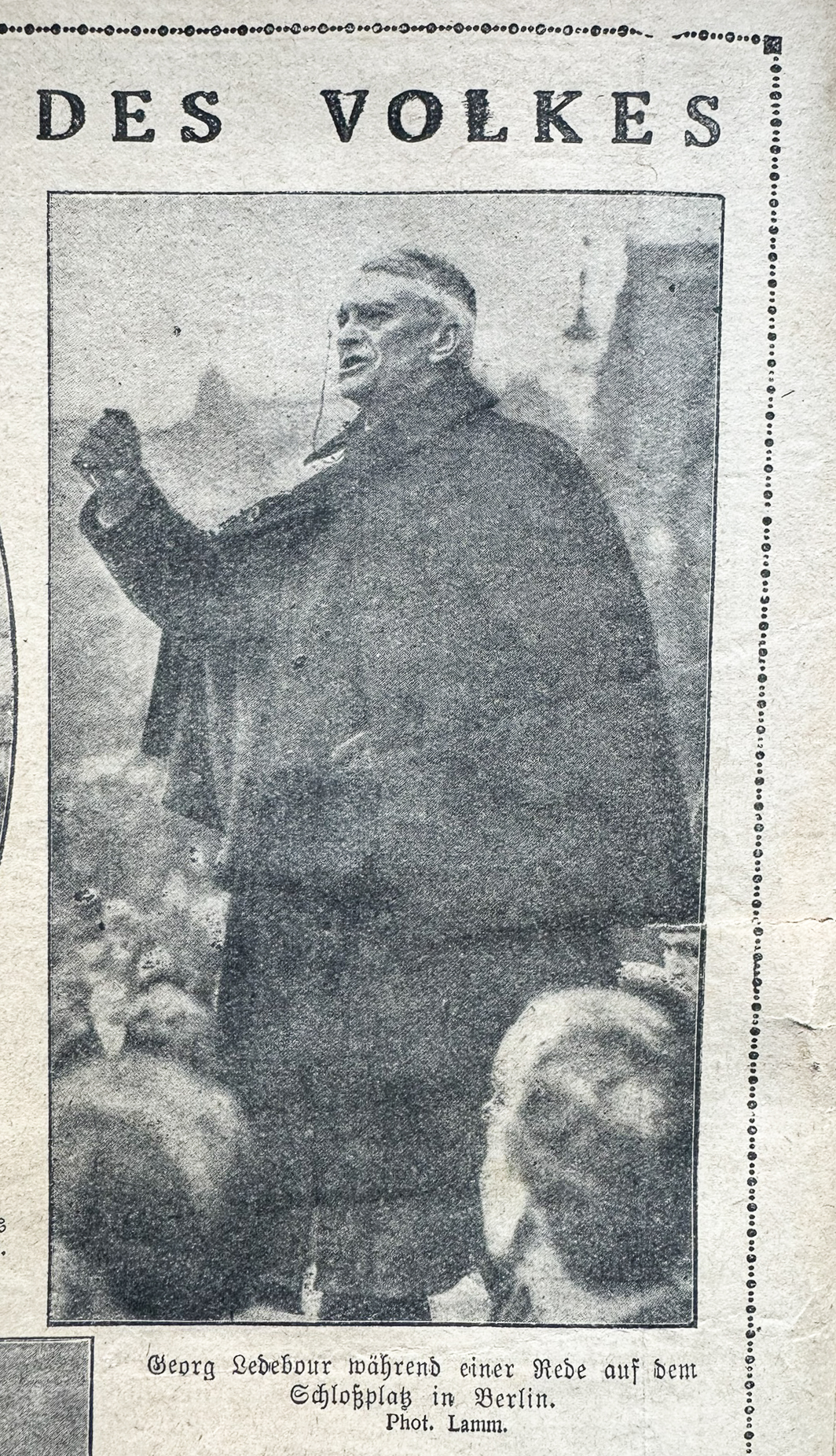
Ledebour speaking at a demonstration in 1919

In 1918-20, the leadership of the MSPD wanted to restrain the German revolution as much as possible, even to the extent of relying on the right-wing enemies of the democratic revolution and government, while the USPD wanted to carry through the revolution and weaken or remove anti-democratic forces. Ledebour was involved in the political leadership, along with Karl Liebknecht, of the Spartacist uprising, an attempt in Berlin to overthrow the government headed by Friedrich Ebert, in January 1919. This was poorly organised and was quickly defeated by the units of the German army and the Freikorps, and notably led to the murder of both Karl Liebknecht and Rosa Luxemburg.

Ledebour remained in the USPD after the splits in that party in 1920–22, when most of the membership merged with the Communist Party of Germany (KPD) in 1920, and most of the rest merged with the SPD in 1922. After a dispute with USPD leader Theodor Liebknecht over party policy on the Ruhr occupation, Ledebour left the USPD and led a split named the Socialist League. After the parliamentary failure of Ledebour's Socialist League, his party endorsed the KPD in elections. Ledebour was also involved in front organizations of the KPD such as the World League against Imperialism and the International Workers' Relief (IAH).

In 1931 he joined the Socialist Workers' Party of Germany (SAPD). He went into exile in Switzerland after Adolf Hitler became Chancellor of Germany in 1933. During this period, he was involved in journalistic activism against the Nazi regime and called for unity between the KPD and SPD.

In 1947, Ledebour spoke out in favor of the merger of the KPD and SPD and died shortly after in Bern in 1947 after a long illness.
