= Socialist Youth League of Germany =

Socialist Youth League of Germany Sozialistischer Jugend-Verband Deutschlands
- Founded: 1931
- Dissolved: 1936
- Merged into: Free German Youth
- Ideology: Socialism
- Mother party: Socialist Workers' Party of Germany
- Magazine: Der Jungprolet

The Socialist Youth League of Germany (German: Sozialistischer Jugend-Verband Deutschlands, abbreviated SJV OR SJVD) was a youth organization in Germany. SJV was the youth wing of the Socialist Workers' Party of Germany (SAPD). SJV was founded in 1931. The organization was banned after the Nazi take-over 1933.

SJV published Der Jungprolet ('The Young Proletarian') 1931-1932. Der Jungprolet was edited by Willy Kressman and Mannfred Margoniner.

In January 1936 SJV merged into the Free German Youth (FDJ) along with the Young Communist League of Germany and the Socialist Workers Youth.
