= August Enderle =

German socialist politician, trades unionist, journalist and author

August Enderle (5 August 1887 – 2 November 1959) was a German socialist politician, trades unionist, journalist and author.

== Life ==
=== Provenance and early years ===
August Enderle was born into a cooper's/carpenter's family in Feldstetten, a small artisanal town in the hills between Stuttgart and Ulm. He trained and qualified for work in the metals based industry sector and took work as a machinist in Stuttgart. It was in Stuttgart that in 1910 he joined both the Social Democratic Party ("Sozialdemokratische Partei Deutschlands" / SPD) and the Metal Workers' Union ("Deutscher Metallarbeiter-Verband" / DMV). He was opposed to war but was conscripted into the military in 1915 and remained in the army till the war ended.

The 1914 decision of the party leadership to implement what amounted to a parliamentary truce for the duration of the war set off acute disagreement within the party from the outset, and division only grew as slaughter on the frontline and austerity on the home front intensified. Enderle had participated in antiwar street demonstrations in 1914 and when, in 1917, the SPD split over the issue, August Enderle was part of the left-wing group that broke away as the Independent Social Democratic Party ("Unabhängige Sozialdemokratische Partei Deutschlands" / USPD). After the war ended, as a succession of revolutions broke out across the country and the USPD itself broke apart, in 1919 he joined Germany's newly formed Communist Party.

=== Weimar years ===
In 1921 he was taken to Berlin by Jacob Walcher who appointed him as trades union editor team for Die Rote Fahne ("The Red Flag"), the leading party newspaper at the time. During his time in Berlin he also worked, till 1928, for the trades union department of the party central committee. During 1922/23 his work for Die Rote Fahne was interrupted when he represented the German party on the Moscow based executive of the Red International of Labor Unions ("Красный интернационал профсоюзов" / RILU). He also contributed on trades union matters to Inprecor, the international magazine of the Comintern.

During the 1920s the Soviet Union's ruling Communist Party became increasingly polarised between the backers of Joseph Stalin and those who doubted the direction in which Stalin was leading the party. The most prominent of the doubters was Leon Trotsky, and the most damning (and, as the years progressed, dangerous) condemnation that a comrade could receive from the Stalinist faction was to be described as a Trotskyite. The Soviet party and the German party were closely aligned and the increasingly fevered ructions in Moscow found their direct echoes in the German party which, during the second half of the 1920s, came under the control of an increasingly intolerant "hardline Stalinist" leadership. In 1928 August Enderle was identified as a follower of Heinrich Brandler and Jacob Walcher. That made him a right winger, and in December of that year he was excluded from the party. Earlier in 1928 he had travelled to Moscow to speak out at the RILU congress against "extreme left-wing" Stalinist resolutions being adopted by it. He now found himself prevented from leaving the city. It was only after he had threatened the congress organiser, Osip Piatnitsky, that he would personally visit the German ambassador in order to obtain/recover his passport that he was permitted to return home to Germany.

=== Party splits ===
Among those who opposed the party's adherence to the Stalinist hard line, August Enderle's profile was higher than most because of his contributions to the party publications The Red Flag and Inprecor. In addition, in 1927 he published a book, Die Gewerkschaftsbewegung. Ein Leitfaden für proletarische Gewerkschaftsarbeit ("The trades union movement. A manual for proletarian trades union work"). He also published a widely distributed pamphlet, Kampf um den Achtstundentag ("Struggle for an eight hour day"). On his exclusion from the party at the end of 1929 he was accordingly a leading voice among the many hundreds of comrades similarly treated at this time. The response was the creation of an alternative communist party, known as the Communist Party (Opposition) ("Kommunistische Partei Deutschlands (Opposition)" / KPD-O). August Enderle and his longstanding fellow activist Irmgard Rasch were among its founders, under the leadership of Heinrich Brandler and August Thalheimer. During 1929 August Enderle and Irmgard Rasch were married.

Largely as a result of the sustained surge in support for right-wing populism, there was a growing belief among thoughtful left-wing politicians that the Nazis would only be kept out of power if the left could present a united front. Within the Social Democratic Party (SPD) this gave rise to a break-away faction that urged a merger with the Communist Party. This faction became the Socialist Workers' Party ("Sozialistische Arbeiterpartei Deutschlands" / SAPD). There was in some ways an obvious parallel between the SAPD's emergence from the left wing of the SPD and the KPD-O's emergence from the right wing of the Communist Party. During 1931/32 the KPD-O itself effectively split, with a number of prominent members, including August Enderle, transferring to the SAPD. Others who made the same switch included Paul Frölich and Jacob Walcher. In the SAPD Enderle became editor of the party's daily newspaper, Sozialistische Arbeiter-Zeitung ("Socialist Workers' Newspaper"), initially based in Berlin. Soon afterwards he moved, along with the production office of the "Sozialistische Arbeiter-Zeitung", from Berlin to Breslau.

=== Nazi years ===
The Nazis came to power in January 1933 and lost little time in transforming Germany into a one-party dictatorship. After the Reichstag fire at the end of February 1933 it became obvious - if it had not been already - that those identified as politically active communists were of particular interest to the authorities. Political parties including the SAPD were banned and Ernst Eckstein, Breslau leader of the party, died as a result of state torture on 8 May 1933. August Enderle briefly took over leadership in Breslau of the now illegal SAPD. The next month he was able to emigrate to the Netherlands where he lived, between July and November 1933, in Amsterdam. Following his expulsion he lived, between November 1933 and March 1934, in Brussels where he was a member of the de facto SAPD leadership team in exile. Using the cover-name "Antonius" he contributed to the "Marxist Tribune". In March 1934, the authorities having declined to renew his residence permit, he was obliged to move on again, this time to Sweden. He settled with his wife in Stockholm where he was the leader of the exiled SAPD Swedish group. In Sweden he took work as a machinist and joined the Swedish Metalworkers' Union. He was able to undertake political work, notably involving German seafarers, through the ITF and as a member, between 1936 and 1938, of the Popular front movement.

War broke out across most of Europe during September 1939: military advances during the next couple of years by the German army further reduced the number of places where German political exiles might be relatively safe. Norway fell in the early summer of 1940: one young SAPD who was forced to leave the country was using the name Willy Brandt. Brandt moved to Stockholm where for the next few years he worked closely with Enderle. During the closing years of the war Enderle and Brandt took a lead in the SAPD members' decision to join or rejoin the Social Democrats at the end of 1944.

=== British occupation zone / German Federal Republic ===
War ended in May 1945 and the Enderles returned to Germany the next month, both now members of the Social Democratic Party. Thanks to support from the International Transport Workers' Federation (ITF) he was among the first political exiles from Nazi Germany to be able to return, a return described in at least one source as "illegal". Breslau, where he had lived directly before going into exile in 1933, had been forcibly "cleansed" of its German-speaking population and in any case was no longer in Germany. The western two thirds of what had been Germany had been divided into four military occupation zones. The Enderles settled in Bremen which was surrounded by the British zone, although for strategic reasons Bremen itself would become an enclave under US military control. August Enderle's first work was as "trades union editor" with the Weser-Kurier (daily newspaper), a new publication of which his wife was a co-founder. Less than two years later, in April 1947, he became editor in chief of "Bund", the Cologne based Trade Union Confederation newspaper for the British zone.

Enderle's political activism after the war extended well beyond his work as a journalist. Within the party he backed the left-wing socialist position. During the second half of 1945 Wilhelm Pieck, a senior German politician recently "parachuted" by Moscow into the Soviet occupation zone as part of what turned out to be a well planned "nation building" project, thought it worth his while personally to try and persuade August and Luise Enderle to rejoin the Communist Party: the Enderle's rejected that idea, however. During the immediate postwar period August Enderle also participated in the activities of the Bremen-based Struggle against Fascism Association (Kampfgemeinschaft gegen den Faschismus / KGF), founded on 3 May 1945 and widely seen, at least in retrospect, as a front organisation of the Communist Party.

August Enderle formally retired in 1954, by which time the British occupation zone had been merged with the American and French zones (but not the Soviet zone) and relaunched, in May 1949, as the German Federal Republic (West Germany). He continued to contribute journalistic pieces and also set to work on a history of the trades union movement. He died in Cologne on 2 November 1959. The mourners at his funeral included Willy Brandt, his close comrade during their Stockholm exile and by this time a leading figure in the SPD and the Mayor of West Berlin.
