= Agnes Heineken =

German teacher and women's rights activist

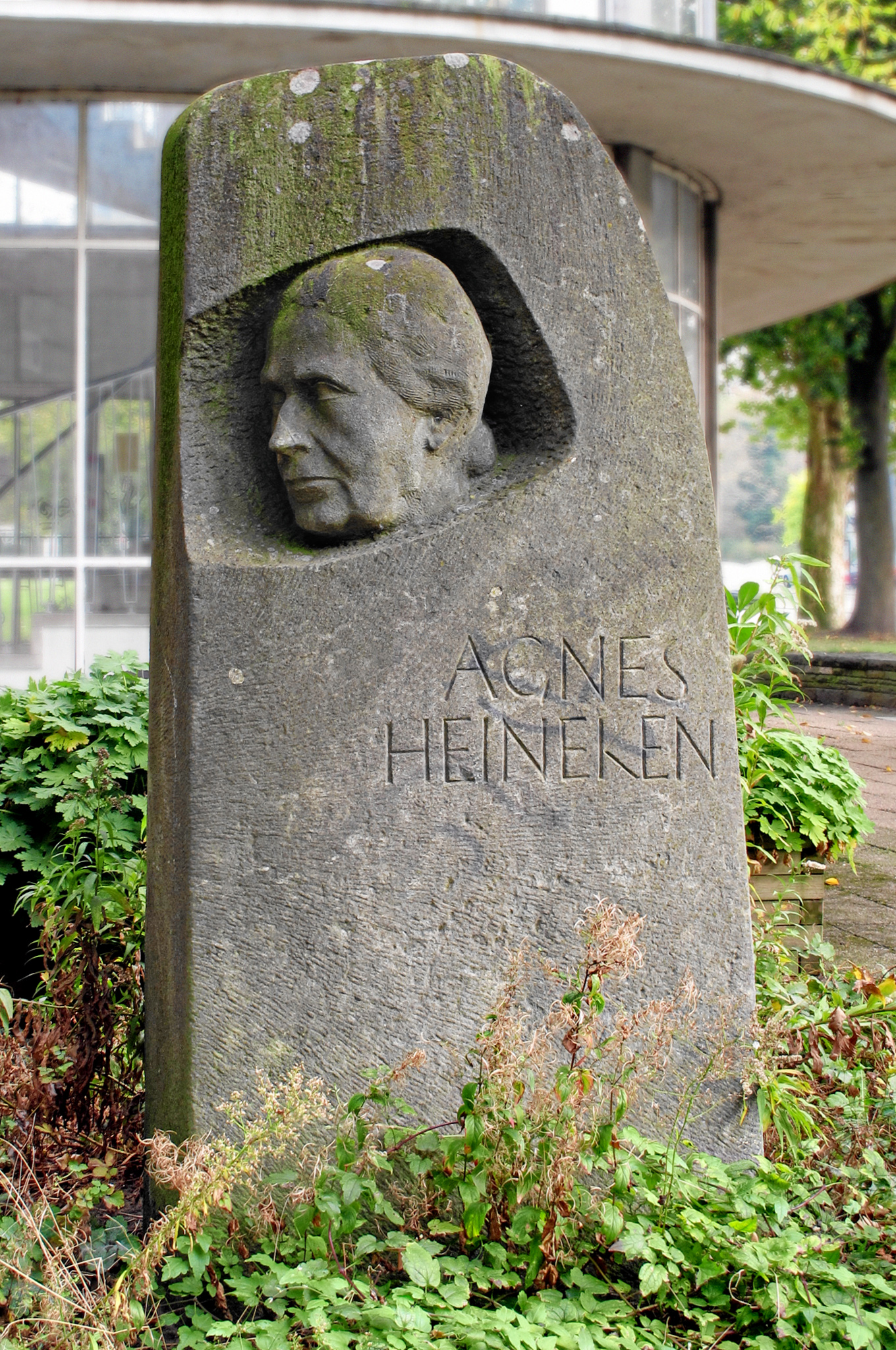
- The monument to Heineken in Bremen, Germany
- Born: Sara Agnes Heineken; 13 July 1872; Bremen, Germany
- Died: 5 July 1954 (aged 81); Bremen, West Germany
- Occupations: Teacher; Campaigner for Women's rights Campaigner for girls' education Education reformer Politician "Bürgerschaft" member
- Political party: DDP
- Parents: Hermann Friedrich Heineken (1835-1918) (father); Agneta Tholen (1844–1912) (mother)

Sara Agnes Heineken (13 July 1872 – 5 July 1954) was a secondary school teacher who became a prominent women's rights advocate. Deemed politically unreliable in 1933, she was deprived of her public appointments in the education sector, but after 1945 she returned to the public stage, taking a lead in restoring the education system. An obituary described her as a great organiser and an impressive personality, and a woman who, driven by her powerful sense of social responsibility, fought tirelessly for the education of girls and women, and for equal rights for women in society.

== Biography ==
=== Provenance and early years ===
Sara Agnes Heineken was born in Bremen, which was also the city in which she would live and, 82 years later, die. Friedrich Heineken (1835–1918), her father, was employed as a city buildings officer: he later became head of the harbour buildings inspectorate. Her mother's pre-marriage name was Agneta Tholen (1844–1912), indicating Scandinavian – probably Swedish – familial connections. Agnes was the second of her parents’ five recorded children. Her experience of childhood was a lively one, growing up in the family home set beside the “Schlachte” promenade alongside the right bank of the Weser where it passes through the city centre. Her parents shared the house with their children and at least two supplementary aunts.

She was six when she was enrolled at the “Höhere Töchterschule Janson” (school for girls) in 1878. The school had been the first school for girls when Ida Janson's father had founded it in 1860, and she, as the eldest of her parents’ children, took charge of their father's school when he died in 1878. She continued to run it supported by siblings, till 1907. The deputy head, Mathilde Lammers (1837–1905) is better known to posterity as a women's right activist-author than as a school teacher: she was both. Her influence over the infant Agnes Heineken was very considerable. The normal arrangement at the school was for girls to enter it when they were six and complete their schooling when they were fourteen. Sources give Heineken's year of graduating from the school as 1890, by which time she was nearly 18. Her final years were spent studying at the training college for women teachers that Johann August Martin Janson had already created alongside the school when setting it up back in the 1860s. Heineken then remained at the “Höhere Töchterschule Janson” for nearly a further two years, till 1892 She was employed as a teacher, having in October 1890 passed the exams necessary to qualify for work at the junior and middle levels.

=== Further education ===
Between 1892 and 1894 Heineken took the opportunities provided by her teaching qualification and experience to travel extensively, principally in France. During lengthy stays in Paris she improved her French to the point at which she was competent to teach it as a foreign language in Germany. In October 1894 she passed an exam in Bremen qualifying her to teach French in girls secondary schools. She went on to teach at the private (and apparently short-lived) “Höhere Töchterschule Ida Wohlers“, before returning to the “Höhere Töchterschule Janson” and resuming her teaching work there. She was still not content with the extent of her own educational attainments, however, and during the second half of 1899 she moved to Göttingen where, during the next three years, she studied Germanistics, History and Philosophy. From the exam that she passed at the end of these studies during 1903, she acquired the qualifications of an Oberlehrerin (loosely, “senior teacher”). She returned again to the “Höhere Töchterschule Janson” where now she taught both at the school and at the linked teacher training college. She taught German, History and French, it may have been in connection with her new qualifications that in 1904 French replaced English as the “first foreign language” at the school.

In 1908 Heineken passed an exam qualifying her to work as a “Vorsteherin” (”Head”) at a public sector girls’ secondary school. She was keen, through her own efforts, to facilitate university admission for other women and girls and was by now emerging as an increasingly public advocate in support of this objective.

=== Fired ===
During 1907 Heineken contributed an article to the 12 June edition of the Bremer Nachrichten (daily newspaper) in which she criticised the city authorities for the way in which they were falling behind on schools provision for girls. There were, she pointed out, six state funded higher secondary schools for boys. For girls there were none. Beyond the city limits there was, to be sure, such a school, down-river to the north at Vegesack: a little further down river there was another in the coastal port town of Bremerhaven. Heineken's article certainly attracted attention. Gustav Janson, who had recently taken over control of the “Höhere Töchterschule Janson” from his elder sister, sacked her with immediate effect.

=== Vegesack years ===
In 1907, in compliance with a suggestion from the municipal council, Agnes Heineken started to teach at the state secondary school for girls at Vegesack. She remained in this job till 1918. During this period she continued to campaign for schools reform, calling for a new state-backed secondary school for girls in the city, along with a state funded teacher training establishment for women teachers. In political terms, Heineken's background and beliefs tended to follow the liberal agenda of the times. Her campaigning was not restricted to education issues. Between 1909 and 1912 she led the “Bremer Verein für Frauenstimmrecht ”, dedicated to winning voting rights for women in the face of establishment inertia and conservative opposition. She was also involved, with Verena Rodewald, in the founding in 1910 of the “Frauenstadtbund Bremen”, set up as a city-wide umbrella organisation for various women's groups of a political social character that had emerged during the previous half century or so. During the early years of the twentieth century the focus for many women's organisations in Bremen, as in much of western Europe, was on gaining political influence and social-philanthropic effectiveness through closer coordination, organisation and focus. Agnes Heineken was a redoubtable organiser.

Heineken was for many years a member of the executive board of the “Verein Bremischer Lehrerinnen” (VBL / “Association of Bremen women teachers”). and chair of the Bremen section for higher and middle schools for the Allgemeiner Deutscher Lehrerinnenverein, a national umbrella organisation of women teachers. Beyond feminist campaigning she was, in addition, an active member of the free-thinking Deutscher Monistenbund. The ideals and objectives of the Monistenbund are hard to pin down in a couple of lines: it was internationalist and pacifist in outlook, with an all-encompassing science-based world view. But in terms of the more specific issues of the day, there was seldom a fixed consensus to be discerned among the – by 1912 – approximately 6,000 members.

=== The German republic ===
Military defeat in 1918 was followed by the enforced elimination of the monarchy. During 1918/19 a wave of revolutions swept across the country, much of it regional in its focus and involving brief transfers of power in city halls to self-defined workers’ and soldiers’ “soviet” councils, while national politicians struggled to find a new way ahead that did not involve further bloodshed on the scale unfolding in Russia. By the end of 1918, women aged 20 and above had been given the same voting rights as men in Germany, as one of a number of moves to try and counter the influence of “Bolshevism”. That left a generation of feminist activists with one important issue on which they no longer found it necessary to campaign. When it came to gender equality in respect of the education system, however, there was still much to be done. In 1918 Agnes Heineken became the Director for Schools at the Bremen-based “Frauen-Erwerbs- und Ausbildungsverein” (”Women's Employment and Training Association”). She successfully concentrated support on the further development of professional and vocational schooling for girls. With others, she was involved in founding the “Soziale Frauenschule ” in 1918, the “Allgemeine Frauenschule” in 1919 and in 1920 the “Sozialpädagogische Seminar für Kindergärtnerinnen und Hortnerinnen ” (”Socio-pedagogical Training Institute for Kindergarten workers and Afterschool Supervisors”). That was followed by a “Höhere Handelsschule ” (”Senior Business School”) in 1921, a “Kinderpflegerinnenschule” (”school for Kindergarten carers”) in 1923, a “Seminar zur Ausbildung von Gewerbelehrerinnen” (”Training Institute for Business School Women Teachers”) in 1926 and, in 1929, “höhere Fachschule für Frauenberufe” (”Senior Schools for Women in the Professions”) in various parts of the city.

After just over three weeks, on 4 February 1919 the Bremen Soviet Republic was crushed on the orders of the central government, by military force. On 9 March 1919 elections were held for a Bremen National Assembly, mandated to agree a new constitution for the state of Bremen. It was agreed between the competing groups to follow an ordinance dated whereby the state should be divided into four separate electoral districts, of which Bremen-city, allocated 166 of the 200 seats, was by far the largest in terms of population. Candidates had to be at least 20 years old, and were permitted, for the first time in history, to be women. When the results came in, 18 of the 200 seats had been won by women. Agnes Heineken was one of the successful female candidates, elected as a list candidate of the DDP (… Liberal Party). The new constitution having been agreed, the Bremen National Assembly gave way to a reconstituted "Bürgerschaft"(state parliament) by means of a state election in June 1920. Heineken was re-elected, remaining a member of the ”Bürgerschaft” till February 1921 and then again, following further re-election, between November 1923 and November 1930. She used her parliamentary position to campaign effectively for undifferentiated comprehensive schools, bursaries for children staying on at secondary school beyond the statutory minimum school leaving age, and provision of further adult education for war widows and for other women and girls affected by unemployment.

An achievement as a parliamentarian of which Agnes Heineken was particularly proud came quite early on, in April 1920, when she persuaded the assembly to legislate for a “Bremer Jahre” (”Bremen Year”). This was an obligatory extra year of schooling for girls after year 8, which was devoted to “home economics”. The scheme was implemented in Bremen through the creation for the purpose of a separate college: Heineken herself took official responsibility for its operation. The development caught the attention of education planners in other cities, both within and beyond the borders of Germany, and several copied it. However, priorities and fashions in respect of girls’ education moved on, and 1959 the “Bremen Year” component of the school curriculum - at least in the terms in which Agnes Heineken had promoted and implemented the concept – was ended.

=== Hitler years ===
The Hitler government took power at the start of 1933 and the country was quickly transformed into a one-party dictatorship. The DDP had reconfigured itself and then, in 1930, rebranded itself as the more overtly nationalist DstP (party) in order to try and appeal to National Socialist voters in a context of intensifying political polarisation. Many existing party stalwarts had reacted by withdrawing from political involvement, while the electoral tide towards fascism, buoyed by stratospheric levels of unemployment, had persisted. Heineken had not stood for re-election to the ”Bürgerschaft ”in 1930, and during 1933 she found herself denounced, on behalf of Hitlerites, for her lack of support for nationhood and her “rejectionist attitude”. By the end of the year she had been forcibly removed from all her public and education related leadership jobs, and subjected to a significant diminution if pension entitlement. Schools she had created were all taken into state control. During the twelve Hitler years she would stick within a small close-knit circle of friends and do what she could to help citizens suffering persecution through decisions by government officials concerning their perceived Jewishness.

=== US occupation zone / German Federal Republic ===
After the war, between May 1945 and May 1949, the north-west of Germany was administered as the British occupation zone. An exception was made for the state of Bremen because of U.S. insistence on the need for direct control over one of the two main northern port cities for strategic and logistical reasons. Bremen was therefore administered under U.S. military control. Notwithstanding the many changes brought about by Hitler and the war, Agnes Heineken was able to resume her work, applying the force of her personality and organisational talent, along with her still very considerable energy, to the necessary tasks, working across a range of organisations and associations in order to rebuild Bremen's educational institutions.

During 1945/46 Heineken teamed up with others, including Anna Klara Fischer, Anna Stiegler, Käthe Popall and Irmgard Enderle to establish the ”Bremer Frauenausschuss” (BFA / ”Bremen Women's Committee”), intended as a non-denominational non-party umbrella grouping of women's organisations across the state of Bremen, from every part of society. Heineken was a leading figure within the BFA for many years, serving as its president during 1949/50.

Even during her final years, Agnes Heineken continued to serve the senate as an advisor on girls' education.

== Recognition (selection) ==
- The Agnes Heineken Memorial commissioned by the senate and sculpted by Kurt Lettow (1908-1992), takes the form of a stone stele with a high-relief head-portrait. It has stood since 1957 by the "Berufsbildungszentrum" / BBZ ("Professional Training Center") between Blocks A and B in the centre of Bremen.
- "Agnes-Heineken-Straße", a street in Bremen-Obervieland, was named to honour Heineken.
