= Max Maddalena =

German political activist and trades union leader

- Born: Maximilian Maddalena; 17 January 1895; Riedheim (Hilzingen), Baden, Germany
- Died: 22 October 1943 (aged 48); Brandenburg-Görden Prison, Brandenburg, Nazi Germany
- Occupations: Trades Union activist and leader Party activist and official Member of Parliament ("Reichstag"); Anti-government activist
- Political party: SPD; USPD; KPD
- Spouse: Hilda Epple (1898–1994)
- Children: 3
- Parents: Enrico Maddalena (1868–1937) (father); Katharina Osswald (mother)

Max Maddalena (17 January 1895 - 22 October 1943) was a German political activist and trades union leader whose political allegiance, after 1920, was to the recently launched Communist Party. After 1933 he emerged as an anti-government activist. Earlier, between 1928 and 1933, he served as a Member of Parliament (Reichstagsmitglied), but sources indicate that even during these crisis years his party work and trades union activism were more to the fore than any contributions that he made in the increasingly deadlocked Reichstag.

== Life ==
=== Provenance and early years ===
Maximilian Maddalena was born at Riedheim (Hilzingen), a hill-country village in the extreme south of Baden, close to the Swiss frontier and, beyond that, Schaffhausen to the west. To the east lay Konstanz. His mother, Katharina Osswald, was a local girl from whom he inherited both his name and his German nationality. Soon after his birth, however, his mother married his father, Enrico Maddalena (1868–1937). Maximilian Osswald became Maximilian Maddalena. He also became, in the eyes of the respective laws, an Italian national. Enrico Maddalena is described as a mosaics worker, a trader in gypsum statuettes and a day-labourer. While he was still a child the marriage of Maximilian's parents ended in divorce, but he retained his Italian name and, indeed, his Italian nationality. He grew up in Riedheim with his mother, living in the house of his maternal grandmother, and, until 1909, attending the local school. Money was in short supply, but the proximity of the border and the mountain terrain provided opportunities for supplementing the household income. His mother had already spent time in jail in 1894 for smuggling sugar syrup, and in June/July 1913 mother and son each served six week prison terms for the same offence. Directly after leaving school he relocated to Lyon where he moved in with his father, intending to learn a craft skill, but he did not remain in France for very long. In 1910 he embarked on an apprenticeship in industrial metal work with Georg Fischer A.G. at their Singen works. (Georg Fischer A.G. was - and remains - a resolutely Swiss company but had opened a substantial factory in the German side of the border to circumvent the fees and tariffs levied by the German authorities on imported products.)

=== Political engagement and another war ===
Maximilian Maddalena was still an apprentice, and only 16, when he joined the DMV (Metal Workers' Union). He joined the Social Democratic Party (SPD) just two years later, in 1913. The First World War broke out in July 1914 and Maddalena lost no time in volunteering for service in the German navy. Despite his Italian citizenship he was accepted. His service record was a distinguished one. He served in Flanders as a member of an elite marine attack company and received a number of medals, including the Iron Cross twice (1st Class and 2nd Class). In 1917 he was also granted of Baden citizenship which, since Baden had been part of the German Empire since 1871, meant that he became a German citizen. He also ended the war with a bullet in one lung which may have damaged his health permanently. During the war the SPD split, primarily over the decision of the party leadership to vote for certain forms of war funding. The anti-war faction consisted primarily of those already on the left of the party, and in 1918, after the war ended, Maddalena switched his party allegiance from the SPD to the breakaway “Independent Social Democratic Party” (“Unabhängige Sozialdemokratische Partei Deutschlands” / USPD). Two years later the USPD also split apart. There was no longer an on-going war to oppose, and a sizeable minority of members returned to the SPD, which by this stage had become Germany's party of government. Meanwhile, Germany had lost its emperor and acquired a republican constitution. At the end of 1920 the majority of former USPD members switched to the recently launched Communist Party (“Kommunistische Partei Deutschlands” / KPD), however. Max Maddalena was one of these. He indeed participated as a delegate from the USPD side at the “unification congress” at which the residuum of the USPD |agreed to the merger with the KPD.

=== Union leader in southern Germany ===
Between 1920 and 1925 the focus of Maddalena's labour movement activism was on his home region in the extreme south-west of Germany. In 1920 he was elected regional treasurer for the DMV (Metal Workers' Union) in Konstanz-Singen. Two years later, in 1922, he received contractual authority (“Bevollmächt”) to enter into agreements on behalf of the local union branch. Another significant responsibility during the first part of the 1920s was his chairmanship of the works council for the important aluminium rolling mills in the region. His preoccupations as a union leader were not so very different from those at the top of the agenda for labour activists across the country. There was an urgent need to ensure implementation of “the achievements of the revolution”, which in the workplace meant, above all, the restriction of the standard working week to not more than 48 hours. Beyond that, under pressure from punitive reparations costs imposed at Versailles in 1919, the government had lost control of the currency. Inflation surged, peaking in 1923. For the unions the pressure was on to achieve increases the levels of wages and salary increases that were commensurate with price increases. The demand for wages of stable value, possibly through paying wages in gold marks, became a central priority for union leaders.

There were battles to be fought inside the union too. Within the regional leadership there were still, at this stage, activist members representing both the SPD and from the Communist Party. Differences surfaced dramatically in August 1921 in connection with a work stoppage at the Singen aluminium plant. The objective of the stoppage, which took place with the full support of Maddalena, was to secure the reinstatement of two works council members whom the company had dismissed. After a few days, however, the dispute had to be called off because there was no majority support for Maddalena's position from the regional DMV leadership. The incident exposed deeper and more intractable differences in approach between Social Democrats and Communists. In the immediate aftermath of the failure of the stoppage Maddalena found himself pilloried in the SPD media. The “Volkswacht” (SPD newspaper) of 1 March 1922 accused him of having staged an industrial “coup d’etat in the aluminium works” which, from the outset, had been sure to fail, but which had nevertheless depleted union funds to the tune of 21,000 marks. The underlying difference was that whereas SPD union officials and activist members were content to take an incremental “step by step” approach to improving the social and legal position of workers, communist leaders such as Maddalena responded to the economic crisis with a polarising fixation on class struggle between the providers of labour and the providers of capital. For Maddalena and his allies within the union, tactical disputes or concern for preserving union funds in accordance with union statutes were of very much less importance than the wider class struggle in which workers were engaged.

During the early 1920s Maddalena also worked for the local party in Singen-Konstanz, apparently on a part-time basis. He also began to acquire a reputation as a public speaker, not infrequently in the context of public demonstrations. At the end of June 1922 he addressed a large street protest that came together to protest against the murder of Foreign Minister Walther Rathenau by right-wing extremists. He called on workers to stand together at a time when the republic and the achievements of the revolution were under threat. A week later, on the day of Rathenau's funeral, Maddalena appeared as one of the principal speakers at another demonstration. This time, however, the organisers lost control of what turned first into a riot and then into a pitched battle between left-wing demonstrators and right-wing “Freikorps” former soldiers (and others). The demonstrators first invaded the site of the Maggi factory in Singen, and then moved in on the Villa Paulssen, followed by the Villa Scherer. Several of the demonstrators were badly injured, and towards the end of the incident Major Julius Scherer (1873–1922), suspected by some of being involved in some sort of a right-wing traditionalist conspiracy to overthrow the republic, was fatally shot.

=== Party official ===
In January 1925 Max Maddalena became a full-time party official, working until April if that year in Berlin in the Trades Union department of the Party Central Committee. At some stage he also accepted a parallel appointment back in his home state as “Secretary for Trades Union Issues” in Baden. Meanwhile, in March 1925 Paul Langner was arrested. Langner was the “Polleiter” (loosely, “Policy Head”) for the party's neighbouring Württemberg region. The position of Württemberg “Polleiter”, based in Stuttgart, was an important leadership role, and in July 1925 Maddalena was appointed to replace his arrested comrade, whoi was still detained pending trial, in the post. As internal feuding among the party leadership again intensified during the second half of 1925, Maddalena was, like Langner, identified as part of the party's left-wing, and thereby as a backer of the party's emerging new leader, Ernst Thälmann. He became immediately persuaded by Comintern’s “Open letter” of August 1925, widely distributed to trades union members. The letter had evidently been drafted and sent from Moscow in accordance with Stalin’s preferences, supporting Thälmann’s leadership bid against the incumbent, Ruth Fischer.

=== Hamburg ===
In October 1925 the party posted Maddalena to the “Wasserkante” district, far away to the north, where he was appointed to membership of the party secretariat (leadership team) for Hamburg and the surrounding region. Hamburg was the homebase of the new party leader, Ernst Thälmann: the area was one in which the Communist Party had been particularly powerful from its inception. The focus of his work in Hamburg was, as before, on “Trades Union matters”. He was accompanied by Hilda Epple (1898–1994) a comrade who accepted a senior administrative position in Hamburg with the newly established paramilitary “Roter Frontkämpferbund” organisation and whom, in 1931, he would marry as his second wife.

=== Reichstag ===
In 1928 Max Maddalena was elected to membership of the ”Reichstag” (Germany's parliament) as a party list candidate for the electoral district of Schleswig-Holstein. He was a re-elected repeatedly until March 1933, by which time he was representing not Schleswig-Holstein but the Breslau electoral district. Meanwhile, parliamentary democracy was being progressively abolished and Max Maddalena himself was living in relative safety in Moscow. During his time as a parliamentarian Maddalena naturally spent much of his time in Berlin, and he came close to several members of the party leadership team including the leader, Ernst Thälmann (1886–1944), the eminence grise, Klara Zetkin (1857–1933) and his near-contemporary (and a communist party star of the future), Walter Ulbricht (1893–1973). Between the end of 1930 and the middle of 1932 he served as a member of the National Executive Committee of the “Revolutionäre Gewerkschafts Opposition” (RGO), which was the Communist Party's version of the German Trades Union Congress. Within the RGO he was head of the section for metals-based industries. Through his work as an effective communist agitator during a period of intensifying political polarisation in the Reichstag and, increasingly, on the streets, Maddalena necessarily found himself in regular contact with the judiciary. In April 1931 he was sentenced to a two-year prison term, having been convicted on a charge of “preparing to commit high treason”. Sources are agreed that he did not serve out the sentence in full, but there is inconsistency over some of the associated detail. It appears that in the first instance he avoided imprisonment by taking an extended trip to Moscow. However, approximately eighteen months later, in November 1932, he was arrested at Tilsit, a border town in East Prussia while apparently attempting to visit Germany. He spent several weeks in a prison at Rastatt, but was released by on 7 December 1932 either in the context of a wider Christmas amnesty for political prisoners or because the authorities belatedly accept his claim of parliamentary immunity from imprisonment.

=== Moscow ===
While in Moscow Maddalena had accepted an appointment, in June 1932, as the Moscow representative of the German RGO with the “ Profintern”, the international trades union confederation established in Moscow some years earlier organisation to promote, encourage and support national communist trades union confederations elsewhere in Europe. According to at least on source this meant that when the Hitlerites took power in January 1933 he was safely back in the Soviet Union. Elsewhere it is indicated that having been released from a German jail only in December 1932, h was still in Germany during the early part of 1933. Either way, when an implausibly wide-reaching wave of arrests targeting communist politicians and activists took place in the immediate aftermath of the Reichstag Fire, Maddalena was probably already on the way back to Moscow, where he continued to work in the European Section of the Profintern until November 1933. He was given responsibility for co-ordinating trades union activities in Austria and Czechoslovakia with those in Germany and later, across western Europe more generally. According to his own later recollection he had “occasional disagreements” with comrade-colleagues in the Profintern headquarters, as a result of which he was permitted to resign, being sent instead to work as a ”Revolverdreher” (specialist lathe operator in a gun factory) in another part of Moscow.

=== A new commission ===
Although in 1933, when leading communist activists had fled Germany, three alternative headquarters for the exiled party had begun to emerge, by 1935 power over the party was increasingly concentrated not in Prague or Paris but in Moscow. It was from Moscow that early in 1935 the Central Committee of the German Communist Party ordered Maddalena to return to Germany, where remaining Communists were operating, if at all, “underground” and the security services were becoming increasingly skilled in their ability to infiltrate spies into supposedly secret cells of political activists. Such infiltrations were followed by arrests. With the benefit of hindsight it is hard to avoid the conclusion that when he crossed back into Germany on 11 March 1935, Max Maddalena was on something of a suicide mission. He nevertheless made his way to Berlin and, presumably, set about trying to contact any comrades still at liberty in the German capital in order to create a new leadership team for Berlin and reorganise what remained of the now illegal communist trades unions in line with precepts predetermined in Moscow. He was to undertake the work jointly with Adolf Rembte, who had arrived in Berlin eight days earlier, and Robert Stamm, who had arrived back from Moscow a week or so before that.

=== Arrest and detention ===
On 27 March 1935 all three men were arrested in Berlin by the security services, together with several other comrades including Käthe Lübeck who had also been engaged in the project to rebuild an “underground” version of the Communist Party. Their activities had been reported to the authorities by a Gestapo spy in their midst. Maddalena was taken to the Moabit Investigation Prison in west-central Berlin. During the next two years Maddalena and the others were subjected to repeated interrogation sessions including some that involved torture. While he awaited his trial he was able to write reassurance to his mother and his friends in Singen: • “I will bear the trial verdict like a man, secure in the knowledge that my efforts were driven only by the need to help working people and, above all, the German working people to improve their situation. Knowing this – not through egotism or personal ambition – along with having been active in the labour movement for twenty-five years and having been focused on the welfare of working people, has given me the necessary strength”.

On 4 June Maddalena, Rembte and Stamm all faced trial in the special People's Court which had been reconfigured and relaunched a few years earlier to handle criminal cases regarded by prosecutors as “political” in nature. Defence lawyers were excluded from the hearing. The prosecutor applied for the death sentence for all three men, and in the case of Rembte and Stamm the court agreed to the application. In the case of Maddalena they did not: at least one source attributes this to some combination of the exceptional level of international press coverage that the trial had attracted and his own exceptional record of service in the navy during the war. He was found guilty, like the others, of preparing to commit high treason under aggravating circumstances. But his sentence was to “life imprisonment”. In view of his deteriorating health and the appalling conditions under which he would spend the next six years, this amounted to what sympathetic commentators described as a form of “creeping execution” ("schleichenden Hinrichtung"). Max Maddalena died on 22 October 1943 at the vast Brandenburg-Görden Prison. The cause of his death is given as “serious stomach and liver illness”, exacerbated by the conditions under which he was detained, for which inadequate medical care was provided.

== Personal ==
Maximilian Maddalena was born and baptised a Roman Catholic but as an adult, where reference is made to his religion, he is described as “konfessionslos”, indicating that he was not registered as a payer of church taxes. He was married twice. His first marriage, in 1916, took place in Singen and was to Lina Happle (1894–1978). The marriage ended in divorce in 1929, though there are indications that the partners had ceased living together some time earlier. The marriage was followed by the births of the couple's children, Hilda, Max and Freya in 1913, 1917 and 1921. Maddalena's second marriage was to Hilda Epple (1898–1994), a Kindergarten teacher who joined the party in 1920 and accompanied Maddalena when he relocated to Hamburg in 1925. They were married in 1931.

The short life of Maddalena's son, also called Max Maddalena (1917–1942), was particularly tragic. He accompanied his father to Moscow in 1932. Through contacts in the IRH he obtained work as a laboratory assistant at the Mosfilm studios. However, the later 1930s were a time of government paranoia in Moscow. Foreigners were at particular risk. On 12 March 1938 the younger Max Maddalena was arrested in Moscow by the homeland security services. He was one of a number of Germans arrested in Moscow at the same time, having been identified as suspected “Hitler Youth members planning an attack on Stalin”. On 15 May 1938 he was released for unspecified “operational reasons”. Government mistrust of Germans reached new depths following the launch of a massive ”surprise” German invasion from the west in June 1941, and the younger Max Maddalena was rearrested in September 1941 for alleged “anti-Soviet agitation”. This time he was convicted and sentenced, on 10 July 1942, to five years of internal exile and sent to Siberia. The circumstances of his death are far from clear, but it is recorded that he died in the Soviet Union on 14 July 1942, thereby predeceasing his terminally ill father by more than a year.
