= Guste Schepp =

German politician (1886–1967)

- Born: Auguste Merkel; 23 August 1886; Bremen, Germany
- Died: 23 July 1967 (aged 80); Bremen, West Germany
- Occupations: Welfare activist Women's rights campaigner Politician
- Political party: DStP
- Spouse: Hans Schepp (1879-1918)
- Children: 5
- Parents: Carl Merkel (1847-1911) (father); Carlotta Clausen (1853-1928) (mother)

Guste Schepp (born Auguste Merkel: 23 August 1886 - 23 July 1967) was a German politician (Deutsche Staatspartei / DStP) and, over many years, a women's rights campaigner.

== Biography ==
Auguste "Guste" Schepp was born in Bremen, the city in which she would live and, more than eighty years later, die. Her father, Carl Merkel (1847-1911), was a successful businessman of Spanish-American provenance. Her mother, born Carlotta Clausen (1853-1928), came originally from Mexico. Guste was one of her parents' seven recorded children: she had four sisters and two brothers.

She attended Anna Vietor's Lyceum (girls' secondary school) till 1901. After that she was sent away for a year to a boarding school in Dresden, followed by a few months in England where she stayed with the family of an English pastor. She then enrolled at the Gustav Janson seminar (teacher-training college). Any ambitions to become a teacher were thwarted, however, since she was forced to abandon her course unfinished by serious illness.

In 1907 Guste Schepp married Hans Schepp (1879-1918), a young Bremen lawyer. The marriage was followed over the next ten years by the births of the couple's four children. Hans Schepp served as chairman of the local "Vereinigung Liberaler Rechtsanwälte" ("Association of Liberal Lawyers") from 1912. However, in 1914 war broke out. Hans Schepp enlisted or was conscripted into the army and was engaged in fighting on various fronts. He was killed in action near Rheims at the start of June 1918, a few months before the war ended.

Brutal bereavement proved the launch pad for a creative widowhood. Guste Scheppe-Merkel teamed up with Lisa Bachof and other Bremen war widows to establish, in 1919, the "Kriegshinterbliebenen-Vereinigung" (loosely, "Association of those left behind after the war") which very soon, with more than 900 members, became one of the largest women's organisations in Bremen. She took a leading role in running the association over the next fifteen years, arranging and providing material and spiritual support, while organising collections, Christmas parties and other treats for war orphans. She acquired, in the process, a reputation as a well-known provider of social support in the city region. President Carstens, who himself grew up during the 1920s and 1930a in Bremen as the child of another war widow and a friend of Hans Schepp, Schepp-Merkel's son, would later describe "Gustel Schepp" in an autobiographical work as "an important, courageous and persuasive woman". (Note: "... eine bedeutende, mutige, und wortverwandte Frau".)

In 1927 she took over the leadership of the "Bremer Frauenverein" (BDF), which had been founded in 1910 by the women's rights campaigner Verena Rodewald (and others) as the "Frauenstadtbund" (loosely, "Women's City Association"). The name change had come about in 1923. In her new role Schepp now proved a tirelsss campaigner for an end to the situation whereby women were disadvantaged on account of gender. Then as now, other topics at the top of the agenda were Peace Resolution adherence and the selective criminalisation of abortion under § 218 of the German criminal code. Through her contributions to the "Bremer Nachrichten" and other newspapers she emerged as an effective campaigning journalist. She reported on the principal women's congresses of the time, and contributed well-considered pen-portraits of important (female) personalities such as Hedwig Heyl, Luise Koch, Ottilie Hoffmann, Anna Vietor and Helene Lange. During a period of intensifying political polarisation and gathering crisis, Schepp-Merkel also kept her readers supplied with commentaries on current events. One example was an article which appeared in the "Bremer Nachrichten" of 8 March 1932 under the heading "Eingesandt aus Frauenkreisen" ("A contribution from the women's groups") in which she launched a debate on the role of women in the - still theoretical, but already widely discussed in some quarters - "Third Reich".

In 1930 Guste Schepp was elected to membership of the "Bremische Bürgerschaft" ("Bremen state parliament") in succession to Agnes Heineken. The centre-left "Deutsche Demokratische Partei" ("German Democratic Party" / DDP) had very recently been rebranded and relaunched as the "Deutsche Staatspartei" ("German State Party" / DStP) as part of a desperate bid to fight back against the surging populism which by this time was increasingly to be encountered not just at political meetings, in extremist newspapers and in parliament, but also on the streets. Guste Schepp participated as a DStP member. She used her new role to call for improved education opportunities for children from impoverished families, and participated actively in the parliamentary welfare committee. Through her work on the welfare committee with the Bremen senator for public welfare provision (and, after the Hitler nightmare ended, future mayor), Wilhelm Kaisen of the SPD. Despite being members of different political parties, they were both issue-focused politicians of the (usually) moderate left. Both Kaisen and his politically involved wife, Helene, became important political allies for Schepp-Merkel and, on a personal level, good friends.

Around the same time as she joined the "Bremische Bürgerschaft" Schepp also became chair of the "Verband Norddeutscher Frauenvereine" (League of North German Women's Associations"), and thereby also a member of the national executive of the "Bund Deutscher Frauenvereine" (BDF), a national umbrella organisation drawing together women's civic rights groups and movements across the country. The geographical scope of her activism expanded dramatically: she found herself delivering talks and attending meetings at a succession of locations between the Ems and the Elbe. The heart of her activism nevertheless remained her home in Bremen at Roonstraße 43 where she lived with her children, made herself available for consultations with war widows, chaired meetings and organised a range of "small events".

The coming to power in January 1933 of the Hitler government marked the start of a rapid transition to one-party dictatorship. There was no room for parliaments, whether nationally or at state level. The political changes of 1933 also put an end to the various forms of civic activism in which Schepp-Merkel had been involved since 1927. Not ready to stay home, during the twelve Hitler years she devoted herself to welfare activities under the auspices of the Evangelical (Protestant) Church. She became a member of the "Bremer Domgemeinde" ("... cathedral community") and in 1938 took over the chair of the "Deutscher Evangelischer Frauenbund" ("... Protestant women's association" / DEF), a position she would retain till 1964. Although her activities during this period are largely unreported, the installation by the government of the theologian Heinrich Weidemann as district bishop for the Bremen region turned out to be the trigger for a relatively pubpic altercation. Shortly before accepting his episcopal appointment Weidemann had become a party member. Shortly after the appointment took effect, Weidemann intervened in the conflict between " Reichsbischof" ("state bishop") Ludwig Müller and Friedrich von Bodelschwingh, which broke out in the context of the government's attempts progress towards a nationalised church on the English model. Weidemann backed his party comrade, Müller. Schepp engaged in a strident argument with Weidemann, whom she accused of "siding militantly" with the National Socialist party. In a stinging adminition, she warned him against fighting for the church hierarchy without regard for considerations of faith.

By 1945, as the war drew to a close, Schepp-Merkel was living in a makeshift home far to the south, in Bavaria, where she was looking after five grand children. Her old friend Wilhelm Kaisen asked her to return to Bremen to join the collective effort to rebuild the city, but in the immediate term family came first: her return to Bermen was deferred.

In 1950 Schepp-Merkel was a co-founder of the "Jugend-Gemeinschaftswerk" ("Youth Community Work") programme, under the auspices of the DEF). Others involved in the enterprise included Mathilde Wilkens, Else Ahlers and Grete Erling. The focus was on helping disadvantaged young people who had been unable to conclude their education satisfoactorily and transition snoothly into employment. The initiative involved one-year courses in topics such as household management and kindergarten work, along with more generalised courses. She derived huge joy and fulfillment from watching young people enrolled in the programme gain in knowledge, self-confidence, and confidence in life. She particularly relished taking her charges to the "Kunsthalle" (museum-gallery) so as to introduce them to "culture". As chair of the DEF), she lived out her conviction that Christianity must each day demonstrate its worth through actions. Her instinctive political liberalism was conditioned by a sense of responsibility for those whose own personal freedom was constrained. Her commitment to women's rights was predicated on harmony and synthesis rather than on confrontation. She believed it possible to reduce class idfferences and refused to accept the immutability of existing political road blacks. Remarkably, she succeeded in combining her socio-political commitment with family life in ways which enriched both. She continued to involve herself in the Bremen women'sd movement till just a few years before she died.
