= Adolf Rembte =

German communist and resistance fighter (1902–1937)

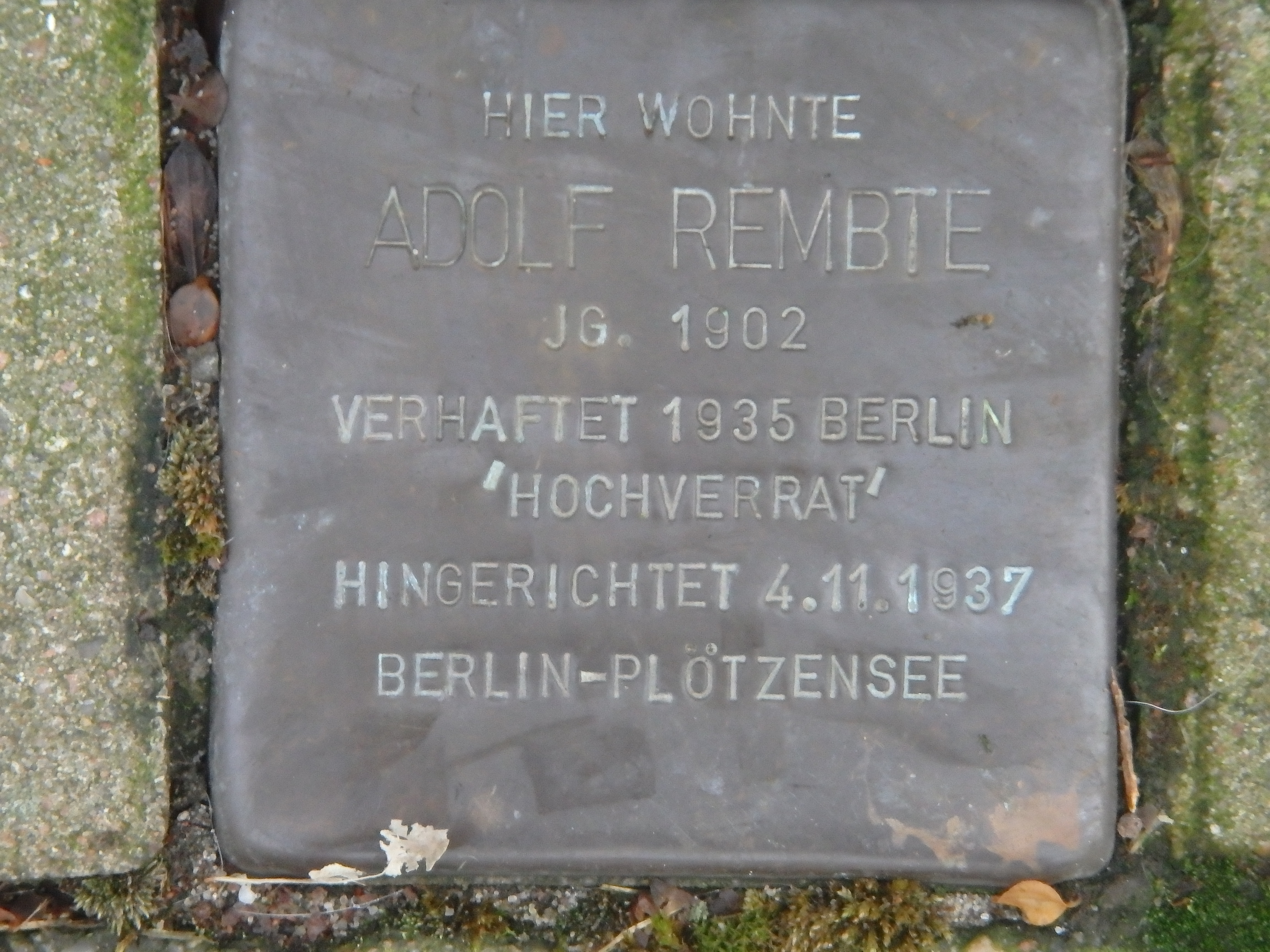
- Stolperstein in Hamburg-Billstedt
- Born: July 21, 1902; Kirchsteinbek (Hamburg-Billstedt), German Empire
- Died: November 4, 1937 (aged 35); Plötzensee Prison, Berlin-Charlottenburg, Germany
- Education: International Lenin School
- Occupations: Political activist/militant Senior party official (various positions); Anti-government resistance activist
- Known for: The circumstances leading up to his execution and the execution itself
- Political party: Communist Party of Germany (1922–)

Adolf Rembte (21 July 1902 - 4 November 1937) was a German communist and resistance fighter against the Nazi régime.

On 14 June 1937, he was found guilty of "preparing a treasonous enterprise" and was executed by beheading on 4 November 1937 in the courtyard of the Plötzensee prison.

== Life ==
Adolf Rembte was born in Kirchsteinbek (Billstedt), a suburb at the eastern side of the Hamburg conurbation. He learned the bakers' trade as a young man, later undertaking casual labour. He was still only 16 at the start of 1919 when he joined the emerging Sozialistische Arbeiter-Jugend ("Young Socialist Workers") movement. He joined the recently launched Communist Party in 1922. He was evidently still based in the Hamburg region in 1923 when he took part in the Hamburg Uprising, an intensely violent albeit brief insurrection by locally based communists in October that year. He was taken into custody and held by the authorities for more than a year in "investigatory detention". On 23 March 1925, he was convicted of "participating in high treason" ("Beihilfe zum Hochverrat") and sentenced to a thirty month jail term. (Note: It was normal for time already served as a pretrial detainee to be offset against any jail term issued in the context of a court trial. If that convention had been applied in this case, Rembte would have been due for release during the first half of 1926.)

At or before the start of 1926, initially as an unpaid contributor and then as a contributing editor, he began writing for the Hamburger Volkszeitung, a newspaper founded in 1918 which since 1920, had operated as a Communist Party publication. Shortly afterwards, having evidently been identified by the party leadership as a potential party official nationally, he accepted an invitation to study in Moscow at the International Lenin School, operated at that time by the Comintern. He attended classes there between November 1927 and the first part of 1930. In Autumn/Fall of 1930 he enrolled at the Moscow Institute for History and Law where his period of study was relatively brief. By 1931 he was back in Germany.

Over the next few years he worked for the party a succession of administrative positions. During summer 1931, he became a course leader and teacher at the "Rosa Luxemburg" state party academy which had recently relocated to Fichtenau (Schöneiche), just outside Berlin. After a couple of months he was arrested in Stuttgart, however. Tried and convicted on 8 June 1932 under a charge of preparing to commit high treason ("Vorbereitung zum Hochverrat"), he was sentenced to a two year jail term. This time, however, he was released after just six months, benefitting from the general political amnesty declared by the government in December 1932, in a desperate attempt to reduce the intensifying political polarisation which was, by this time, spilling out onto the streets.

In January 1933, the Hitler government, exploiting the parliamentary deadlock which National Socialists and Communists had together created, took power. Neither group was committed to parliamentary democracy, and the new government lost no time in transforming Germany into a one-party dictatorship. After February 1933 membership of the Communist Party and active anti-government opposition became illegal. Among comrades Adolf Rembte emerged as a prominent anti-government activist. During 1933, in the aftermath of the take-over of the party's Berlin headquarters at the "Karl Liebknecht Haus" by Nazi paramilitaries on 8 March 1933, Rembte met on a number of occasions with Hermann Schubert. Meanwhile, the party's Berlin headquarters building, "Karl Liebknecht House", was promptly renamed as the "Horst Wessel House". Schubert was a senior member of the party politburo, who would flee abroad at the end of 1933). Before that happened, Schubert appointed Rembte as regional "Polleiter" (loosely, "policy head") for the Halle-Merseburg region. Under the cover name "Rudolf", Rembte was based in Merseberg as principal advisor to the (illegal) regional party leadership between June and (probably) November 1933.

Towards the end of 1933, a wave of arrests by the security services suggested that the local party branch had been penetrated by police spies, driving Rembte to leave the Halle region. He returned to Berlin, where his arrival coincided with a reconfiguration of the national party leadership. A Berlin regional leadership team was established which would try and undertake some of the responsibilities hitherto handled by the party Central Committee. The Central Committee emigrated abroad. The establishment of the new party operation in Berlin was to be undertaken by Herbert Wehner and Wilhelm Kox. Following a conversation with Kox it was agreed with Rembte that the latter should transfer to Düsseldorf and take on the regional leadership of the party's "Lower Rhine" region. The lower Rhine region had been heavily industrialised since the nineteenth century and was traditionally a powerbase for activism of the political left. A relatively strong and well-organised local Communist party branch had survived there, despite the need to operate "illegally and underground" in conditions of tight secrecy. Rembte arrived in December 1934 and remained in the Lower Rhine region for approximately five months, using alternately the cover names "Poser" and "Oskar".

In May 1934, he was summoned back to Berlin to take the place on the Berlin regional leadership team to be vacated by Wilhelm Kox who had been reassigned as the underground party's national "Reichstechniker" (literally, "national technician"), responsible for organising the shielding of the underground party organisation from the authorities. Kox's former duties had involved liaison with underground party organisations across a wide swathe of central and southern Germany, and it seems that Rembte assumed these liaison duties, which carried a high risk of discovery by the authorities. Herbert Wehner had also moved on by this time. Rembte's comrades in the Berlin regional leadership team during the second half of 1934 were Otto Wahls, Philipp Daub and Paul Merker, all three of whom (unlike Rembte) were abroad and alive after the end of World War II in Europe.

At the end of 1934, Rembte was summoned back to Moscow, apparently joining Moscow-based comrades as a representative of the Berlin party leadership in setting party strategy on a new course. A couple of months later, early in February 1935, he was sent to Prague, which was emerging as a headquarters location of the exiled Communist Party of Germany. In Prague, he conducted daily meetings with Robert Stamm and Herbert Wehner, making arrangements for a new Berlin regional leadership organisation. It is a mark of the importance the party attached to these preparations that the meetings also involved Walter Ulbricht and Franz Dahlem, both of whom were at this stage living in exile in Paris, and both of whom emerged after 1949 as prominent communist leaders (and mutually mistrustful political rivals) in the Soviet sponsored German Democratic Republic (East Germany). Others attending were Stamm, Max Maddalena and Wilhelm Knöchel. It was agreed that Rembte, Stamm, Wehner and Maddalena should return to Berlin and set up the relaunched underground Berlin party control centre, while Otto Wahls, who previously had been regarded as the guiding force for the Berlin office was now posted back to Moscow. Rembte arrived in Berlin on 2 March 1933. Stamm and Maddalena made the journey at around the same time. Wehner was not with them, however, since he had recently been caught up in a raid by the Prague police who detained him for five weeks. The three comrades in Berlin were therefore working without the presence of the man who had, it seems, been expected to co-ordinate their activities. On 27 March 1935, while Wehner was still in Prague, Rembte, Stamm and Maddalena were arrested in Berlin, along with Käthe Lübeck, a comrade originally from Bremen who had not been present at the planning meetings in Prague, but had returned to Berlin from Moscow at the end of 1934, and was with the three men at the time of the arrests.

== Death ==
Following his arrest Rembte was detained briefly in a Gestapo "House Prison" of the kind normally used for relatively intensive "questioning". He was then transferred, probably to the increasingly infamous Moabit Penitentiary in west-central Berlin, where he was held in investigatory custody for approximately two years. On 4 June 1937, Rembte, together with comrades Walter Griesbach and Käthe Lübeck, appeared before the special "People's Court", facing a charge of preparing a highly treasonable undertaking ("Vorbereitung eines hochverräterischen Unternehmens"). The "guilty" verdicts followed ten days later.

Rembte and Stamm were sentenced to death. Of those arrested with them, Maddalena was sentenced to a life prison sentence. He died as an inmate of the Brandenburg-Görden Prison on 22 October 1943 because of a serious stomach illness in respect of which, according to sympathetic sources, he was not provided with the necessary medical attention. Unlike these others, Käthe Lübeck outlived the Nazi regime. During her two years of pretrial detention Hans Lübeck, who was himself in prison between 1934 and 1936, divorced her, which hurt her terribly. On 4 June 1937, she was sentenced by the People's Court to a twelve year prison term. She was held in a succession of prisons and labour camps, the last of which was the Waldheim Penitentiary near Chemnitz, to which she was transferred in March 1945. She was liberated by Soviet forces in May 1945, which was also the month in which war ended. Many of the thousands of prisoners whom the Soviets came across as they moved west were viewed with deep suspicion, and some were event transported to labour camps in the Soviet Union; but the Soviets were evidently quickly persuaded of Käthe Lübeck's identity and their leaders were fully briefed on her political record which seems to be why she was released so promptly. She died in 1984.

The sentences, especially the death sentences handed down for Rembte and Stamm, were widely reported internationally and attracted widespread condemnation. That was partly down to Stamm's wife Erna, whom he had married in 1926, and who now successfully communicated the court decisions to the media. In London, The Times, the News Chronicle, the Daily Herald and other newspapers called for the sentences to be reversed, but that was not what happened. International condemnation from countries in which, hitherto, many of the more negative manifestation of Hitler's new Germany had received little press coverage, intensified after the executions.

On 4 November 1937, Adolf Rembte was executed on the guillotine placed for the purpose in the courtyard of the Plötzensee prison. Stamm was executed on the same day as part of the same batch.
