= Hermine Berthold =

German resistance member and politician (1896–1990)

- Born: Hermine Auguste Brühning; 22 March 1896; Bremen-Hastedt, Germany
- Died: 2 June 1990 (aged 94); Bremen, West Germany
- Occupations: jute mill worker trades unionist politician
- Political party: USPD; SPD
- Spouse: Hermann Berthold (19xx-1939)
- Children: 1. Hermann Berthold; (1915-1958); 2. ______ Berthold (1918- 194x: kia); 3. ______ Berthold (1922- 194x: kia)

Hermine Berthold (born Hermine Brühning: 22 March 1896 – 2 June 1990) was a worker, a politician (SPD), a resistance activist during the Nazi years and a member of the Bremen parliament ("Bremische Bürgerschaft") both before and after that twelve-year hiatus.

== Life ==
=== Provenance and early years ===
Hermine Auguste Brühning was born the illegitimate daughter of a serving-maid in Bremen-Hastedt, then a poor rural settlement just outside the city into which, for administrative purposes, it would be subsumed in 1902. While she was still a child her mother married the widowed father of seven children, and Hermine accordingly became the elder sister to seven step siblings. Her new stepfather was an activist member of the Social Democratic Party (SPD), which ensured an early introduction to the rapidly changing world of socialist politics. After completing her time at junior school, in 1910 she followed her mother into domestic service. The period was one of rapid industrial expansion across much of western Europe, however, and "factory wages" were generally higher than those of domestic servants. Working hours in factories, although long by later standards, were generally neither as long nor as unpredictable as those experienced by domestic servants. After two years (like her future political colleague Käthe Popall) she took a job with the vast jute mill ("Jute-Spinnerei und Weberei Bremen") in the central Walle quarter of Bremen. Her first son was born in 1915. The boy's father, a sailor called Hermann Berthold, married her three years later when her second son was born. Hermann had by this point lost his job at sea, and was working on the land, but this was not sufficiently well paid for him to support a family, and Hermine Berthold continued to work at the factory. By the time the couple's third son was born, in 1922, Hermann Berthold had become a dock worker. They could afford for Hermine to take a break from paid work and concentrate on the children, while also devoting more time to her political activities.

=== Politics ===
Very soon after joining the workforce at the jute mill she became involved in the activities of the textile workers trades union ("Textilgewerkschaft") and of the Consumers' co-operative movement ("Konsumgenossenschaft"). She became a member of the Young Socialists and of the local Hastedt Workers' Sports Association.

Hermine Berthold joined the Independent Social Democratic Party ("Unabhängige Sozialdemokratische Partei Deutschlands" / USPD) in 1918 or 1919. The USPD had broken away from the SPD in 1917, principally because members rejected the mainstream party's parliamentary support for funding the First World War. Around about the time she joined it, the USPD was itself undergoing a further split, with the leftwing majority (nationally) forming the nucleus of the new Communist Party. However, Hermine Berthold was one of the USPD members who remained in the party which then, in 1922, merged back into SPD. The war had finished and been followed by a year of revolutions in the cities, the toppling of the Kaiser and the launch of a republican governmental structure (which incorporated votes for women without much sign of the resistance that the notion encountered elsewhere in Europe). The party leadership's support for war credits back in 1914-18 was yesterday's issue. In the Hastedt SPD Berthold took the initiative in creating a women's group inside the local party, and was very soon recruited onto the executive committee of the women's group in respect of the whole of Bremen, then operating under the leadership of Anna Stiegler. Sources indicate that Berthold was valued by party comrades at this time for her energy and for the "directness" of her approach.

In 1930 she was recommended as an SPD candidate for election to the Bremen parliament ("Bremische Bürgerschaft") and in the Autumn elections was duly elected. She remained a member until 15 March 1933 which was when the parliament, like other democratic institutions across Germany, dissolved itself in response to the enforced rapid transition towards one-party dictatorship which had been underway since the start of the year.

=== Nazi years ===
She remained politically active during the Nazi years which was, by definition, illegal (except for Nazi Party supporters). Berthold retained particularly close links with Anna Stiegler. Meetings of the SPD local party executive still took place, but they were now defined as birthday parties. They were nevertheless effective opportunities for exchanging information and discussing ways in which the Nazi régime might more effectively be opposed. There was illegal printed material, smuggled in at great personal risk by covert couriers from abroad, to be located and distributed. Along with her "illegal party work" Hermine Berthold sustained her contacts with members of "Vorwärts", the consumer co-operative with which she had been working since the 1920s. The Nazis never disbanded the consumer co-operatives, even though they tended to be front organisations for the outlawed Social Democratic Party.

The intelligence services penetrated the Bremen SPD during 1934. In November 1934 Hermine Berthold and Anna Stiegler, along with a large number of party comrades were betrayed to the authorities and arrested. The charge was the usual one of "preparing to commit high treason" ("Vorbereitung zum Hochverrat"), and the sentence was a four year jail term. By the time of her trial and sentencing Berthold had already been held in "investigatory detention" at Bremen's "Ostertorwache" (as the establishment was then known). The next three years she spent at the women's prison at Lübeck-Lauerhof. Here she became friendly with the only communist from Bremen being held in Lübeck, Käthe Popall. After 1945, throughout West Germany, the relationship between the SPD and the Communist Party, became ever frostier, but in Bremen Hermine Berthold and Käthe Popall would remain the firmest of friends over the decades that followed. In 1938, her sentence expunged, Hermine Berthold was released. A year later, on 1 September 1939, as German and Soviet troops invaded Poland from opposite sides, Berthold was re-arrested because she had failed to comply with conditions imposed by the authorities. In defiance of Gestapo threats, she had continued to make contact with (politically inclined) friends from the pre-Nazi years. Three months after the re-arrest, to her surprise, she was released again. This seems to have been because, directly before her fre-arrest, her husband had suffered a fatal accident in the port, where he had evidently still been employed.

=== Loss ===
The unexpected death of Hermann Berthold in 1939 was followed by the deaths of the Bertholds' second and third sons in the war. Their eldest son, described as "always delicate", survived, and continued to live with his mother till he died, still relatively young, in 1958. Public records indicate that by this time Berthold was also a grandmother, but sources are otherwise silent over her four grandchildren.

=== After the war ===
- "Now more than ever, standing before another huge pile of rubble, women can not and must not stand aside from political life"
- "Gerade jetzt, wo wir wieder vor einem Trümmerhaufen stehen, kann und darf die Frau im politischen Leben nicht beiseite stehen."

Hermine Berthold addressing a local meeting in Huckelriede district, 30 January 1946

Directly after the war, as she concentrated on making her half destroyed apartment habitable for herself and her surviving son, there was a determination to have nothing more to do with politics, but that quickly weakened and she became a member locally of an all-party ant-fascism association, which in the end was dissolved in December 1945. Bremen had ended up under US military occupation, quickly acquiring great strategic significance as the Cold War unfolded, being the principal transit point in western Germany for the US military. Berthold was persuaded by comrades to rejoin the (no longer banned) Social Democratic Party, re-establishing the Bremen-Hastedt women's section of it. She became a member of the executive committee of the "greater" Bremen women's section of the SPD, now being re-created by Anna Stiegler.

October 1946 saw the first free elections to the now re-instated Bremen parliament ("Bremische Bürgerschaft") in sixteen years. On 16 October 1946 Berthold was elected to the assembly, remaining a member till 1959. In her "candidate leaflet" she presented herself as a woman who, as a factory worker, had "up close experience" of the class antagonisms in the capitalist system, and undertook to stand up, in particular, for working class voters. As a postwar parliamentarian she was a member of the groups dealing with nutrition, agriculture, labour and restitution. Colleagues found her diligent and reliable, but also quiet, preferring behind the scenes work to making speeches to the full. assembly.

Berthold also resumed her involvement in the local Consumers' co-operative movement, now on the supervisory board, working closely with Käthe Popall, her Communist friend from their time in prison together. She continued her co-operative work long after she retired, at the age of 63, from membership of the Bremen parliament.
