= Henny Sattler =

- Born: Juliane Henriette Sattler; 11 August 1829; Bremen (German Confederation)
- Died: 9 February 1913 (aged 83); Bremen, Germany
- Occupation(s): women's rights activist social work pioneer midwife
- Parent(s): Siegmund Sattler (1788–1863); Amalia Charlotte Dorothea Beste (1801-?)

Henny Sattler (11 August 1829 - 9 February 1913) was a German women's rights activist and a social work pioneer.

== Life ==
Juliane Henriette "Henny" Sattler was born into a prosperous merchant family in Bremen. She was the fourth of her parents' eight recorded children. Siegmund Sattler (1788–1863), her father, was the Bavarian consul and a businessman. She later looked back on a childhood living in what was almost Bremen's "aristocratic quarter". Their neighbours were judges, senators and leading city merchants. However, their neighbours also included a large number of coachmen and their horses, since Bremen's mail-coach depot was close by. Bremen was a busy port city with a strong northern work ethic: it was characteristic of the time and place that their home was a "grand house" where the family lived and from where their father's business was managed. Alongside the living quarters were offices where the traders worked and clerks computed commissions and organised shipments. There were also storage sheds for merchandise. Their father's five apprentices were treated as family members just as much as the children's nurses and the maids. The living accommodation was simple. At family meals the adults and the small children sat at table while the older children were expected at stand. The grander rooms were usually closed and unused except on special occasions. The so-called "tea room", for example, was generally reserved for special social events, unless someone died, when it was used as a temporary morgue. (It was also the room in which Henny and four of her seven siblings were born.) The warehouses and the street outside provided abundant possibilities for the children to play with each other and with the children of neighbours: Henny later remembered noticing that the daughters of their neighbours tended to be more expensively and restrictively dressed than she was. Despite her gender she was even permitted to accompany her elder brother Wilhelm Sattler (1827–1908) and her parents when they undertook a "grand tour". However, equal opportunities were not on the agenda of the European haute bourgeoisie: there could never have been any question of her studying to qualify as a teacher. That did not preclude a determined streak of autodidacticism that would follow her through life. She made a point, as a very young woman, of undertaking several lengthy visits to France in order that she might later become a languages teacher.

Through her friendships with Ottilie Hoffmann and Marie Mindermann she became involved with the rapidly developing women's movement in Bremen, and she was soon numbered among the activists in it. Inspired by equivalent developments in Berlin, in 1867 the three women joined with others to establish the "League for expanding work opportunities for women" ("Verein zur Erweiterung des weiblichen Arbeitsgebiets") later, following a succession of name changes, becoming the "Women's Prosperity and Training League" ("Frauen-Erwerbs- und Ausbildungs-Verein"). Hoffmann now had to withdraw from the movement in order to look after her parents, while Mindermann and Sattler became members of the board of management and continued to play leading roles. Within a year membership had reached 500 and they were agitating for women's suffrage. They had set up what sources describe as a "Model establishment for female work" ("Nachweisanstalt für weibliche Arbeit") and "Sewing Schools and a Further Education School" ("Näh- und eine Fortbildungsschule"). A year after the creation of the "Further Education School" disagreements emerged on the board of management over whether it should be managed by the league directly, or whether it should operate independently with its own management structure. One source presents this as a difference between the men and the women board members. The matter was in any case resolved when the women got together and took over the school as an independent institution. Henny Sattler became its head. She paid particular attention to training for child care work. She also participated in setting up a "Women's Education Association" which organised mixed Sunday evening programmes involving lectures and artistic presentations.

Meanwhile, a year after its establishment the "Model establishment for female work" ("Nachweisanstalt für weibliche Arbeit") had not been as successful as hoped, and was transferred into private ownership. This led to criticism at the 1869 "Conference of Women's Employment Associations" ("Conferenz der Frauen-Erwerbsvereine"). Sattler understood the criticism but drew attention to one or two special aspects of the situation: "...it has turned out that supply and demand cannot be sufficiently satisfied" ("... daß dem Angebot und der Nachfrage nicht immer genügt werden kann").

After Henny Sattler's funeral early in 1913, Pastor Steudel, a committed member of Ernst Haeckel's Monisten League and a proponent of "free religious" ideas, paid tribute to her:

- "She tried to bring together, in particular, all the necessary power that was still in short supply for the female gender, and grasped very early on ideas that have today become mainstream ... As a leader in the women's movement and in social organisation she showed the way."
- "Sie suchte alle besonders noch im weiblichen Geschlecht brachliegenden Kräfte zusammenzuschließen, und hatte so früh schon den Gedanken erfaßt der nun die Ethik unseres Zeitalters beherrscht ... Als eine Führerin in der Frauenbewegung und der sozialen Vereinstätigkeit hat sie bahnbrechend gewirkt."

The "Berlin Women's Conference" in 1869 promoted the creation of training opportunities for nurses and child carers that were not dependent on church and Henny Sattler was won over to the idea in respect of Bremen. The opening of the Bremen Red Cross Hospital in 1876 offered the opportunity to do something about it. The target candidates were the protestant daughters of respectable families, but none of these came forward for the training. Sattler therefore enrolled for training and then, with the authority from her age and social position passed on her newly-found knowledge to students. The tactic seems to have met with success since she was subsequently invited to Magdeburg and Schönbeck to help with the development of similar Red Cross hospitals.

Twenty years later, now aged sixty, she had not lost her appetite for new knowledge. In 1889 a new Maternity Facility was constructed, but the project floundered because no midwives with "suitable backgrounds" could be found. Sattler acquired the relevant qualification herself which permitted the facility to be opened. For many years it operated under Sattler's direction. rapid industrialisation during the 1880s and 1890s and the growth in trade through the port of Bremen meant that the city was experiencing a surge in industrial accidents, often to men who were from outside the city and had no local knowledge or personal contacts to rely upon if they encountered difficulties.

Rapid industrialisation and the growth in trade through the port of Bremen meant that the city was experiencing a surge in industrial accidents, often to men who were from outside the city and had no local knowledge or personal contacts to rely upon if they encountered difficulties. In response to the problem, in 1897 Sattler joined with others to work on the creation of a "Welfare Information Centre" in Bremen and then took charge of running it.
