= Irmgard Enderle =

German politician, trade unionist and journalist

- Born: Irmgard Rasch; 28 April 1895; Frankfurt am Main, Germany
- Died: 20 September 1985 (aged 90); Cologne, West Germany
- Occupations: Politician; Journalist; Writer
- Political party: KPD; KPDO; SAPD; SPD
- Spouse: August Enderle (1887-1959)

Irmgard Enderle (born Irmgard Rasch: 28 April 1895 – 20 September 1985) was a German politician, trade unionist and journalist.

== Life ==
=== Early years ===
Irmgard Rasch was born in Frankfurt am Main. Her father was a secondary school teacher, and she too undertook a training to become a teacher. As a young person she was a member of the Wandervogel hiking organisation and of the Free German Youth Association. In 1917 she passed a teaching exam and embarked on several terms at Berlin University, studying Pedagogy and Social Economics. She set up a socialist student group at the university and joined, in November 1918, the Spartacus League, staying with it when it relaunched itself as the German Communist Party. In the middle of 1919 she became a full-time party official, initially in the agriculture sector and then, till 1924, in the trades union department.

=== Communist politics ===
By the mid 1920s Irmgard Rasch had become a member of the (relatively) right-wing grouping in the party leadership, along with comrades such as August Thalheimer and Heinrich Brandler. As a more hardline group struggled successfully to strengthen their hold at the top, Rasch lost her trades union department position to Ruth Fischer who was, at this time, considered more in tune with the left-wing leadership. Rasch now took a post as trades union editor of the Communist Party daily newspaper "Klassenkampf" ("Class Sruggle") based in Halle. For 1927 she switched to the same position with the party's national newspaper, "Rote Fahne" ("Red Flag").

Savage power struggles in Moscow which saw potential rivals to Stalin removed from positions of power and influence within the Soviet Communist Party were closely mirrored in the German sister party. At the start of 1929 Irmgard Rasch, as a member of the faction around Brandler and Thalheimer, was among those excluded from the party by the Stalinist leadership under Ernst Thälmann. The expelled communists now formed an alternative party, known as the Communist Party of Germany (Opposition) ("Kommunistische Partei Deutschlands (Opposition)" / KPDO). Irmgard Rasch was an active member.

In 1932 Rasch was one of a number of KPDO who joined the newly formed Socialist Workers' Party ("Sozialistische Arbeiterpartei Deutschlands" / SAPD), a Centrist Marxist party, for most purposes positioned between the Communists and the SPD. Other Communists who moved over to the SAPD at this time included Paul Frölich, Jacob Walcher and August Enderle, whom Irmgard Rasch had married in 1929. The new party was particularly successful in attracting support in Breslau which had become her husband's home city, and where Irmgard Enderle became a member of the party's regional leadership.

=== Nazi Germany and Swedish exile ===
In January 1933 the political context changed dramatically when the Nazi Party took power and converted Germany into a one-party dictatorship. Work for a political party - except for the Nazi Party - was now illegal. August and Irmgard Enderle nevertheless continued with their (now illegal) SAPD party work in the Breslau region. Irmgard was arrested by the Gestapo and briefly interned in June 1933. Two months later she was able to escape from Germany to the Netherlands and Belgium. By 1934 she had moved on to Sweden where she would live, with her husband, for more than ten years.

In Stockholm August and Irmgard Enderle, together with Stefan Szende and, from Summer 1940, Willy Brandt, comprised the leadership team of the Sweden-based SAPD (party) in exile. Back in Germany the Enderles were deprived of their German nationality in April 1941. From Sweden they were able to provide practical support for anti-Nazi resistance groups in north Germany. Until the Moscow Show Trials of 1937 they were also active supporters for the creation of an international Popular front. She was also writing during this period for the Swedish trades union press. Around 1937/1938 Irmgard Enderle - unlike her husband - came politically close to the breakaway "Neuer Weg" ("New Path") movement centred on Peter Blachstein and Walter Fabian. While contributing to the Swedish Trades Union Press, Enderle was also writing for the Rote Revue published in Zürich.

Although the Enderles had joined the SAPD from a breakaway section of the Communist Party, most of its members had come originally from the SPD. By November 1944 the end of the war was in sight, and it was evident that Germany would undergo some sort of new beginning. The exiled SAPD in Stockholm, like its counterpart in London, now reunited itself with the SPD. It was as an SPD member that Irmgard Enderle would spend the rest of her political career.

=== Postwar Germany ===
August and Irmgard Enderle returned to Germany during Summer 1945, with the help of the International Transport Workers' Federation. They settled in Bremen and concerned themselves with rebuilding the local SPD and the Bremen trades union structure. In September 1945 she was a co-founder in Bremen of the "Weser Kurier" (newspaper), remaining a member of its editorial team till 1947.

Irmgard Enderle was a prominent woman within the Bremen feminist movement. In 1946, together with Agnes Heineken, Anna Stiegler, Käthe Popall and Anna Klara Fischer, she founded the Bremen Women's Committee, a widely acknowledged cross party and religiously interdenominational federation of women's organisations from all levels of society in the Bremen region. Between 1946 and 1947 she chaired the committee, before being succeeded in the post by Charlotte Niehaus.

At the regional government level, between 1946 and 1947 Enderle was a member of the Bremen parliament. In respect of the occupation zones which became, formally in May 1949, West Germany, she was a member of the Bizonal Economic Council from 1948 till 1949.

Between 1947 and 1949 she edited the newspaper "Bund", and from 1949 till 1951 she edited the Trades Unions Confederation newspaper "World of Work" ("Welt der Arbeit"). She was also working as a freelance journalist, with a particular focus on trades union education work. Along with this she undertook certain leadership roles in the trades union movement. Between 1950 and 1955 she was a member of the executive of the print workers' union, IG Druck und Papier, and at one point she was chair of the German Journalists' Union and of the Women's Committee of the Trades Unions Confederation. Along with all this, she was a member of the Union of Persecutees of the Nazi Regime and of the Humanist Union.
