= Hausbesitzer (political party) =

Political party

- Political position: Single-issue

Hausbesitzer was a minor historical political party in Weimar Germany, the party only operated in the Bremen Landtag. Its main goal was to represent private property owners.

== Election results ==
Bürgerschaft of Bremen
Election	Votes	%	Seats	+/-	Position
1924	12,560	6.89	8	▲8	▲5th
1927	15,356	7.66	10	▲2	5th
1930	8,731	4.32	5	▼5	▼6th

== See also ==
- Bremen state elections in the Weimar Republic
