= Anna Klara Fischer =

German political activist (1887–1967)

Anna Klara Fischer (born Anna Klara Schmelzkopf; 22 October 1887 – 24 March 1967) was a German political activist. The focus of her activism was on social policy in general and, more specifically, on the avoidance of drunkness and the impoverishment of wives and children that it caused. She also became actively engaged in various issues touching on women's rights.

== Biography ==
=== Provenance and early years ===
Anna Klara Schmelzkopf was born in Braunschweig, one of seven siblings. Friedrich Heinrich Schmelzkopf, her father, worked as a school teacher while her mother, born Anna Brandt, ran the home. She attended and successfully graduated from an all-girls' secondary school and went on to work as a teacher of Anglistics and Biology, teaching at a state school in Braunschweig. She was able to combine an active part-time career as a journalist with her teaching work.

The connection between political consciousness and physical fitness in Germany at the start of the twentieth century was far more overt than in England or North America. Her own letters of the period indicate a powerful political commitment and self-belief. There was also a stated commitment to support the down-trodden. Strongly influenced by the swirling social currents of the time, Schmelzkopf became involved with the Wandervogel youth movement which combined a love of hiking and of nature with hostility to industrialisation and a form of nationalism based on a romanticised vision of the past. Like all mass movements not under government control, the Wandervogel were viewed with suspicion by the mainstream political establishment. For Anna Klara Schmelzkopf, leading a healthy life in harmony with nature and opposed to militarism blended seamlessly with the social and wider goals of the emerging (largely at this time middle-class) women's movement. In 1912 she married Paul Fischer, a fellow "Wandervogel", who came from a family of churchmen and theologians, but had himself become, like her, a teacher. He taught Physics and Mathematics. The marriage led to a breakdown in Anna Klara's relationship with her own family, and the young couple settled in Bremen, a rapidly expanding industrial port city roughly 160 km / 100 miles to the north-west of Braunschweig. The marriage was followed by the births of their two daughters, in 1918 and 1925.

=== Bremen and temperance ===
In Bremen a chance meeting with the pioneering temperance activist Ottilie Hoffmann took place in 1913. This and the friendship which ensured had a defining impact on the rest of her life. She joined Hoffmann's movement and became an energetic temperance activist herself. In 1921 she became chair of the Bremen-headquartered "Deutsche Frauenbund für alkoholfreie Kultur" (loosely, "women's anti-alcoholism league") in succession to Ottilie Hoffmann, and of the Bremen regional group of the "Deutscher Bund für abstinente Frauen", which promoted abstention from alcohol among women. When Ottilie Hoffmann died at the end of 1925, a few months after her ninetieth birthday, it was clear that in terms of combatting alcohol abuse, she had found a reassuringly committed and energetic successor in Anna Klara Fischer.

During the first part of the 1920s Hoffmann and Fischer worked closely together, and after 1925 Fischer greatly expanded the network of alcohol-free bars and restaurants that Hoffmann had launched back in 1910. By this time the "Deutsche Frauenbund für alkoholfreie Kultur" was increasingly becoming a national movement, and in 1924 Fischer was elected to its national executive committee, increasingly playing a leadership role at a national level, becoming national chair in 1934.

=== Under National Socialism ===
At the start of 1933 the Hitler government took power. This was followed by a rapid switch to one-party dictatorship. Fischer succeeded in negotiating the contradictions of those times. A deeply committed pacifist, openly horrified by the role played by government paramilitaries in enforcing the will of the party, she was able to prevent, the incorporation of the "Deutsche Frauenbund für alkoholfreie Kultur" into the "Nationalsozialistische Frauenschaft" ("National Socialist Women's League"), until 1943, despite coming under intense political pressure to do so earlier. In 1933, many in Europe who believed that German austerity and unemployment could not be any worse under the new government than they had been under successive governments since 1930 and earlier. There was also widespread hope placed in the new leader, who during the middle 1930s let it be known that, out of concern for his own health, he was moving towards a vegetarian diet. Hitler was also believed to drink alcohol, by the standards of the times, only very sparingly. It was possible to hope that the need for "healthy living" and the accompanying struggle against the drug alcohol, with all its destructive consequences for families, women, children and young people, would be reflected in government policy. Disappointingly, healthy living for the masses turned out not to be a government priority, however. In her capacity as national chair of the "Deutsche Frauenbund für alkoholfreie Kultur", Anna Klara Fischer looked after more than 400 female athletes at the 1936 Berlin Olympiade.

=== Post war ===
She continued her work after 1945, overseeing the rebuilding the alcohol-free bars and restaurant destroyed by British and American bombing during the early 1940s, and then |further extending the network. Upon Fischer's suggestion, the Woman's Christian Temperance Union chose Bremen for their 1956 convention, she was elected a vice-president of the organisation. In November 1962 she attended the organisation's 22nd "World Women's Temperance Union" in New Delhi and was elected "first vice-president".

In 1946 she teamed up with the feminist-politicians Agnes Heineken, Anna Stiegler, Käthe Lübeck and Irmgard Enderle to found the Bremen Women's Committee ("Bremer Frauenausschuss" / BFA), a widely acknowledged cross party and religiously interdenominational federation of women's organisations from all levels of society in Bremen. Between 1951 and 1959 she served as president of the BFA in succession to Heineken.

== Recognition ==
- During her final years Anna Klara Fischer became honorary president of the "Deutsche Frauenbund für alkoholfreie Kultur".
- She was a recipient of the silver and golden shields of honour from the "Deutscher Paritätischer Wohlfahrtsverband".
- Anna-Klara-Fischer-Straße in Bremen-Kattenturm was renamed in her honour
