= Anna Stiegler =

German politician (1881–1963)

Anna Stiegler (born Anna Behrend: 21 April 1881 – 23 June 1963) was a German politician (SPD). She is remembered, in particular, for her contributions on women's issues and social policy more generally. During the Nazi years she was involved in what came to be termed "antifascist resistance", spending much of the period in prison.

She was married twice, and may be identified in sources, using her first married name, as Anna Vogt.

== Life ==
=== Family provenance and early years ===
Anna Sophie Marie Auguste Behrend was born in Penzlin, a small town in the flat marshy countryside to the west of Stettin. Her father was a farm worker. Training to become a teacher was, for financial reasons, not possible, and on leaving school she therefore took a series of jobs in domestic service and as a children's nanny. Her work drew her to the cities, and during this time she lived successively in Schwerin, Hamburg and Blumenthal, at that time a separate municipality directly to the west of the Bremen city limits. Here she met the master tailor, Konrad Voigt. Their daughter, Anna Marie Sophie Wilhelmine Vogt, was born in 1902. They set up home together in Blumenthal and married one another in 1903. At their home they took out a subscription to the Bremer Bürger-Zeitung ("Bremen Citizens' Newspaper"), a regional Social Democrat newspaper which combined with her husband's political commitment to awaken her own political interest. She read with growing attention about preparations being made for the SPD national party conference which in 1904 was to be held in Bremen at the Casino Hall at the harbour. She was able to attend the party conference and listened enthralled to speeches by party stalwarts including August Bebel and Paul Singer. She later described the event as the key experience in her political life. The day before the main party conference, she had probably been present at the same location where the third SPD women's conference had been held, at which Clara Zetkin had spoken on the need for reform of public schooling.

It was still three years before the lifting of the ban on female participation in politics, but in 1905 she nevertheless began to involve herself in the unofficial SPD women's group that had been set up in Blumenthal. Tragically, 1905 was also the year in which the Vogt's infant daughter died. In 1908 the ban on female participation was lifted and Anna Vogt joined the Social Democrats in March. Two months later she was deputy party secretary for the Neu-Rönnebeck district - today north Bremen. Her political involvement intensified. She became secretary ("Schriftführerin") of the women's group in the local Blumenthal party and later, after moving into the city itself, in Bremen where she also worked in the party library. It was shortly after this that she met Carl Friedrich Stiegler, a print worker, and ten years her junior. Her first marriage ended in divorce and in 1912 she and Stiegler started living together. They married in 1916. Stiegler, like her first husband, was a committed Social Democrat. However, the First World War produced internal ructions that tested party unity beyond breaking point.

=== War and its aftermath ===
The 1914 decision by the party leadership to declare what amounted to a parliamentary truce on the issue of funding for the war gave rise to dissent on the part of party activists from the outset, which only intensified in the face of austerity and destitution at home and the industrialised slaughter of men on the front lines. In 1917 the party finally split apart: Anna Stiegler was part of the anti-war faction that broke away to become the Independent Social Democratic Party ("Unabhängige Sozialdemokratische Partei Deutschlands" / USPD). The end of the war in 1918 was followed by a series of revolutions in many parts of Germany and by 1919 the country's political structures had become very much more democratic than hitherto. In Bremen Anna Stiegler, as a USPD represented, was elected to the eighteen person commission mandated to produce a new constitution for the regional parliament ("Bremische Bürgerschaft"), and she sat as an elected member of the resulting assembly - one of the first women to do so - from 1919 till 1933, focusing especially on social and education issues. From the outset she was also a member of the parliamentary executive. One of her worst days in the Bremen parliament came in 1932 when, as the assembly's longest serving member, she found herself obliged to follow the rules and accept the election of a National Socialist president of the chamber. Meanwhile, in the early 1920s the USPD itself had splintered, with a majority of its members joining the recently launched Communist Party of Germany. Others, including Anna Stiegler, in 1922 resumed their membership of the mainstream SPD She would remain a lifelong pacifist, however.

=== Nazi years: more war ===
The change of government in January 1933 led to a rapid change in the political backdrop. The new government lost little time in transforming Germany into a one-party dictatorship. Responding to government pressure, the regional parliament ("Bremische Bürgerschaft") dissolved itself in March 1933. Four months later the SPD itself was formally outlawed, having already experienced several months of increasingly determined official harassment. With other Social Democrats, Anna Stiegler continued to be politically active, concentrating on practical support for the families of politicians who had been arrested. She also continued to organise meetings which might have been construed either as harmless women's social gatherings or else as political meetings of women unsympathetic to the government. More than one source also refers to her having printed and distributed leaflets setting out opposition to the government. In November 1934, on the basis of information provided to the Gestapo by an informer, she and her husband were among 150 government opponents caught up in a mass arrest in the Bremen area. In 1935 she faced trial and was convicted under the usual charge of "preparing to commit High Treason" ("Vorbereitung zum Hochverrat"). Sources differ over the duration of the prison sentence that she received, but in any event, she remained in detention for between ten and eleven of the twelve Nazi years. Steigler was consigned to the Women's Prison in Lübeck where fellow inmates, convicted on the same charge as she, included Hermine Berthold and the Bremen communist resistance activist Käthe Popall. After 1945 she would work with them both on political issues. When her prison term ended, probably in December 1939 a few months after the outbreak of the Second World War, Stiegler was transferred into "protective custody" at the Ravensbrück concentration camp. Afterwards she spoke little about her Ravensbrück experiences until her eightieth birthday, when she shared some of her memories: she recalled that conditions in the concentration camp had been significantly harsher than they had been in the prison. Under the "divide and control" strategy used to administer the concentration camp she was designated as a "Funktionshäftling", assigned to supervise fellow inmates. She herself recalled that it was because of the strength of her politically grounded conviction that in the end good would triumph over evil, that she was able to endure the concentration camp life more robustly than others, as a result of which she was able to provide support and comfort to fellow inmates. Several sources mention that as a result of this she was known to some as the "angel of Ravensbrück" ("Engel von Ravensbrück").

In April 1945 20,000 women were sent out of the camp on an "evacuation march" which would become a death march for many. The context was one in which the Soviet army was invading Germany from the east and the German authorities had decided, for various reasons, to empty the concentration camps before the foreign forces arrived, a decision which in the case of Ravensbrück was implemented between 27 April and 3 May 1945. Anna Stiegler survived the experience, finding refuge in a farm house, although it was not till January 1946 that she was able to return to Bremen. It was only now that she learned that Carl Stiegler, whom she had heard nothing for at least a year, had not survived the concentration camp experience. He was probably killed at Bergen-Belsen.

=== New beginnings after the war ===
Anna Stiegler quickly resumed her political activity. She rounded up remaining former members of the pre-1933 SPD women's groups and set up a cross-party non-denominational Bremen women's committee. This became an umbrella organisation to support a range of different groups from all levels of society in the Bremen region. Fellow founding committee members included Agnes Heineken, Anna Klara Fischer, Käthe Popall and Irmgard Enderle.

Bremen had ended up as part of the US occupation zone and the military authorities were keen to re-establish democratic structures in "their" part of Germany. In October 1946 Stiegler stood successfully for election to the re-instated regional parliament ("Bremische Bürgerschaft"), elected a vice president of the chamber in 1947, and remaining a member of the assembly till shortly before her death in 1962. In 1946, aged 65, she was one of those who, for whatever reason, seemed to find her energy levels enhanced by the new challenges.

Returning to themes on which she had spoken out during the Weimar years, Stiegler campaigned for relaxation of the abortion laws (§ 118 StGB), advocating free access to contraception and modern effective methods for protecting vulnerable girls. She was energetically committed to women's rights. Mention should also be made of less eulogistic assessments, indicating that towards the end of her life she was not always accommodating to younger colleagues whose approach or tactics might not align unquestioningly with her own, however. There are suggestions of an excessive tendency to promote those colleagues who agreed with her. She was also vociferous in campaigning against West German rearmament, participating effectively in the SPD's successful campaign during the late 1950s to resist the provision of nuclear weapons to the West German army.
