= Anna Vietor =

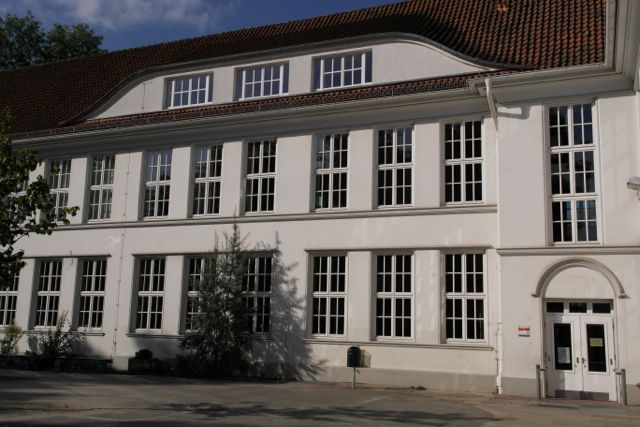
- "Lyzeum Anna Vietor"(subsequently renamed)
- Born: Anna Magdalena Antoinette Vietor; 18 April 1860; Free and Hanseatic City of Bremen
- Died: 10 February 1929 (aged 68); Bremen, Germany
- Education: "Diakonissenanstalt", Düsseldorf-Kaiserswerth
- Occupations: Educator; School head Women's Rights activist
- Parents: Cornelius Rudolph Vietor (1814–1897) (father); Adelheid Luce (1831-1865) (mother)

Anna Vietor (18 April 1860 – 10 February 1929) was a German education pioneer and women's rights activist.

== Biography ==
Anna Magdalena Antoinette Vietor was born in Bremen, the eldest of the children of the theologian-pastor Cornelius Rudolph Vietor (1814–1897) born through his marriage to Adelheid Luce (1831-1865). The Vietor's were a well-established part of the Bremen business community. Her mother's father was a physician. Anna was slightly more than 5 when her mother died. Her mother had been the second of her father's three wives. She grew up in a large family, surrounded by siblings and half-siblings. Of these her brother, Karl Vietor (1861–1934) would achieve a measure of notability on his own account as a leading businessman. The family was committed to Protestant Christianity, with a well instilled sense of social obligation and family connections to the missionary movement, but this did not crowd out all the fun of growing up as part of a well-connected middle-class family in a booming city during an era of optimism.

She attended the Meta Müller elementary school in central Bremen before being switched to Helene Laweg's recently founded secondary school for girls, at which she was among the first to be enrolled, and at which some years later she would herself become head teacher. Both were private schools. On leaving school she enrolled at the "Diakonissenanstalt" (‘’”Deaconess Institute”’’) at Düsseldorf-Kaiserswerth where she trained for teaching work, passing exams in 1879 which qualified her to teach at middle and higher level schools for girls.

Vietor’s first actual teaching experience came at Wernigerode, a small town set in the hill country south of Hannover and Magdeburg, where she worked with a family as a home tutor between 1879 and 1881. Later during 1881 she travelled to Florence, remaining in Italy for some years, teaching at the Florentine Deaconess Institute till 1884. Her time in Tuscany with the deaconesses deepened her Christian sensibilities and encouraged her interest in the Italian language and culture. In 1884 she returned for a year to Bremen where she undertook a course in Italian before returning to Italy: her destination, this time, was Rome. Here she stayed for a further three years, before moving briefly to Berlin where in 1889 she obtained a German teaching qualification for teaching Italian. She then returned to Bremen where she would make her career and live out the rest of her life.

She then returned to the Helene Laweg school which she had attended as a pupil, now as a supply teacher – filling in for staff absences. In 1891 Sophie Petri took over as school head from Helene Laweg, the school’s founder back in 1870. At around the same time as Petri took over Anna Vietor accepted a position as a fulltime member of the teaching staff. Vietor then in 1897, passed the exam necessary to qualify her for a position as head teacher at a girls’ secondary school and two years later, in 1899, took over the headship of it from Petri.

The change of headship was accompanied, by a name change: The Helene Laweg school became known, in due course, as the Anna Vietor school (formally, from 1912, the “Lyzeum Anna Vietor”). The rapid economic and commercial development which continued through the first decade and a half of the twentieth century was accompanied, in Bremen, by an increase in the proportion of citizens from the mercantile and professional classes able and willing to afford a private school education for their children – even for their daughters. It was a time of expansion for the Anna Vietor school, with a major modernisation and expansion of the timetable and curriculum, to which Mathematics was added, together with several new branches of the natural sciences. There was also a focus on recruiting teachers with higher level academic educations. One of the better known of her recruits was the women's rights campaigner Käthe Stricker, who had spent three years between 1904 and 1907 at the University of Göttingen studying English, Philosophy, History and later, in 1912, German, from which she earned a higher-level teaching qualification. Meanwhile, it was also in 1912 that state recognition of the school for the as a “Lyzeum” by the Bremen Senate in 1912 and increased demand for school places from parents led to an expansion in numbers.

Arrangements were set in hand for the school to move to larger premises along the street now known as “Carl-Schurz-Straße” in Bremen- Schwachhausen in the north-eastern quartile of the city centre. The architects August Abbehusen and Otto Blendermann were mandated to design a purpose built school according to specifications provided by Vietor. There was an emphasis on large bright classrooms, lit through large south-facing windows. The new school building was ready for a formal opening in 1913.

The school, like other private schools in the city-state, was nationalised in 1922. Vietor remained in place as head teacher, but now that meant she was working for the public schools service, subject the constraints imposed on all civil servants. There are indications that she did not take easily to the reduction in her control over her own school. As she later confirmed in a letter to the schools inspectorate, “after 20 years in post [she was] no longer in a position … to keep her life’s work in her own hands”. Three years after the schools nationalisation she took the opportunity presented by her 65th birthday to retire with effect from 30 April 1925. She continued to apply her energies to the schools service, however, on a consultancy basis, serving on various committees concerned with education in and around Bremen.

She died at Bremen on 10 February 1929.
