= Ottilie Hoffmann =

Social Reformer

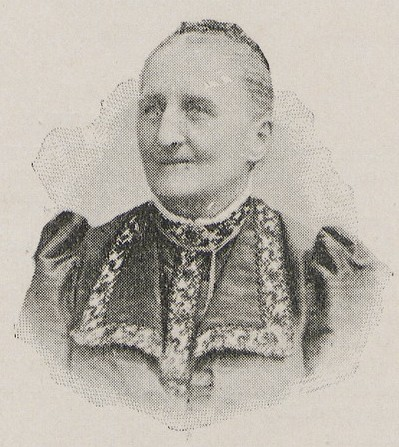
- Ottilie Hoffmann in 1899
- Born: Ottilie Franziska Hoffmann; 14 July 1835; Bremen (German Confederation)
- Died: 20 December 1925 (aged 90); Bremen, Germany
- Occupations: writer educationalist temperance activist
- Parent(s): Ludwig Otto Hoffmann; Friederike Franziska Horn

Ottilie Franziska Hoffmann (14 July 1835 – 20 December 1925) was a German educationalist and social reformer who came to prominence as a pioneering temperance activist.

== Early life and education ==
Ottilie Hoffmann was born in the central Ostertor quarter of Bremen. Ludwig Otto Hoffmann, her father, was a successful grain merchant. She received a "sound" schooling. From her childhood diary entries it is apparent that she was keen that her life should make a difference in society. She was never attracted by the idea of marriage and family life. She studied to become a teacher, embarking on her teaching career in 1851.

== Career ==
As a young woman she was in particular influenced by the radical feminist writer Marie Mindermann. Hoffmann's own pupils during these early years included another daughter of Bremen who would emerge as a prominent feminist social reformer, Hedwig Heyl. Hoffmann taught at a private school between 1852 and 1857: there is mention of her having taught on a British or English island around this time. In 1862 she returned to Bremen to look after her parents who were in failing health.

In 1867, she teamed up with Mindermann and Henny Sattler to set up the "League for expanding work opportunities for women" ("Verein zur Erweiterung des weiblichen Arbeitsgebiets"), later renamed as the "Women's Prosperity and Training League" ("Frauen-Erwerbs- und Ausbildungs-Verein"). However, Hoffmann was obliged to pull back from this initiative in order to look after her parents.

The parents died in 1870 and 1871, which opened the way for a new phase in Ottilie's life. She went back to England. Between 1881 and 1890 she lived in Yorkshire where she took on responsibility for the education of two daughters of the 9th Earl of Carlisle. The girls' mother, Rosalind, Countess of Carlisle, was an energetic campaigner for women's rights, and even more passionate as an advocate of temperance (abstinence from alcohol). Through working for Rosalind Carlisle she was confronted with the results of alcohol abuse, notably among the working population. Alcohol abuse among the workers led to social misery and family violence against women and children. In England Ottilie Hoffmann was impressed by her aristocratic employers' social commitment against alcohol dependency: she experienced for herself how former hostelries might be transformed into reading rooms and tea shops. It was also from Lady Carlisle that Hoffmann acquired the habit, which would later lead some of Bremen's more hidebound citizens to question her sanity, of placing a stout box in one corner of a city part and then standing on it to preach abstinence to passers-by.

That was the background to a personal commitment to total abstinance that Ottilie Hoffmann made on 24 November 1882, an anniversary of her mother's death. All her energies were now directed towards the fight against alcohol abuse. In 1874 the "World's Woman's Christian Temperance Union" (WWCTU / "Weltbund Christlicher Abstinenter Frauen") was launched, initially in Ohio. The WWCTU's objectives and approach ensured that the temperance movement effectively became a part of the Women's suffrage movement that emerged in Europe and North America during the second half of the nineteenth century. Early in 1890 Ottilie Hoffmann returned to Bremen, where a rapidly unfolding social crisis was under way to the north of the main station in the city's main park. The construction work for that year's prestigious Trade and Industry Exhibition was being plagued with accidents caused by drunkenness. At once she built a coffee shop on the site. On 12 February 1891 she set up the "Bremer Mäßigkeitsverein" ("Bremen Temperance Association"), renamed in 1915 "League for alcohol-free eating establishments" ("Verein für alkoholfreie Speisehäuser"). Hoffmann chaired both organisation. Back in 1891 she still was not able to set up an organisation devoted purely to women's rights. That followed only on 17 June 1900 with the establishment of the "German League of Abstinent Women", renamed in 1924 "German Women's League for an Alcohol-free Society" ("Deutscher Frauenbund für alkoholfreie Kultur"). By at least one reckoning by 1894 she had become the leading representative in Bremen of the International Blue Cross Christian temperance movement.

During this time, a number of alcohol free restaurants and "milk bars" were set up around the city, mainly in working class districts. An outlet, the "Freeport coffee and breakfast canteen" ("Kaffee- und Frühstückshalle im Freibezirk") was set up in the "Europahafen" freeport as early as 1901. Coffee was available from five each morning, and service continued till eight at night "except when workers on nightshifts wish[ed] to eat even later". In 1910 and 1912 the "Mäßigkeitsverein" set up two so-called "milk exchanges" in each of the two parts of the newly enlarged freeports. This massively increased sales of fresh milk within the confines of the port area. There was still a massive danger to port workers from alcohol at the time: most of the workplace deaths could be traced back to alcohol consumption.

In 1910, the "Ottilie Hoffmann White Ribbon House" (das "Ottilie Hoffmann Haus Weiße Schleife") opened at New Street 14/15 ("Neuenstraße 14/15"). It was positioned in the western side of inner city in the business district by the Stephanien Quarter, which was then regarded as a working class residential district. This was the first house that the abstentionist Frauenbund owned. Over the years a reading room and a games room were installed along with a small lending library. In the expanded space on the first floor there slowly evolved a "middle-class kitchen", while downstairs meals were provided for poor and destitute people.

During the First World War, the Bremen Temperance Association and local groups from the German part of the WWCTU were called in to provide feeding points and meals for women and children made destitute by the war. They used their existing facilities for the purpose. In 1915 there were nine eating establishments and two "milk bars" involved in these mass catering operations. In addition the association were able to get hold of another fifteen canteen to use for the city-wide relief programme. This also meant administering the distribution of meals, bread and milk. During the period of the war approximately nine million meals were provided.

In 1919, Hoffmann acquired the "good middle-class" eating establishment at Katharinenstraße 13 as her own project after she had failed to persuade other league members to back the purchase of a substantial building of this nature in the prosperous heart of the city. Subsequent developments endorsed her judgement. The Katharinenstraße house was well frequented and broadened the activities of the league in new directions. The place was used for school leavers' parties and other celebrations. Annual accounts show that it generated good revenues, and even, at times of financial crisis, net returns that could be used to compensate for the habitual deficits reported by the "Ottilie" temperance canteens in the harbour area. The 1932 accounts reported that: "Nearly all the secondary schools hold their 'Farewell parties' and class days with us. Our 'alcohol-free bowling' facilities provide a suitably exhilarating end-of-term celebration. Alongside the main party hall there are another three good sized dining rooms. There is the reading room on the second floor, next to a - sadly not very large - roof-garden where we put out deck chairs when the weather is good."

There was a strong campaigning element in Hoffmann's temperament. She fought for women's rights and involved herself in social issues and problems. She was a founder member of the League of German women's associations ("Bund Deutscher Frauenvereine"), and elected a member of its executive board. She gave lectures and took part in international congresses.

== Later life and death ==
In 1921, the year of her eighty-sixth birthday, Ottilie Hoffmann identified her successor. Anna Klara Fischer and Ottilie Hoffmann had first got into conversation in an over-filled express train to Hanover in the early summer ("shortly before Whitsun") in 1913. In 1921 Fischer took charge of both Hoffmann's Christian Temperance organisations, the Temperance League and the Abstinent Women's League. During the next few difficult decades she would prove herself a worthy successor. It is nevertheless also striking that Ottilie Hoffmann appointed her successor without first consulting colleagues at either of the organisations affected.

Ottile Hoffmann died at Bremen at the end of 1925. She was 90.

== Celebration ==
In 1970, the "Bremer Mäßigkeitsverein" ("Bremen Temperance Association") was renamed "Bremen Ottilie Hoffmann Association" ("Bremer Verein Ottilie Hoffmann"), the name under which it continues to exist.

In the Schwachhausen quarter of Bremen, Busestraße and Emmastraße are connected by Ottilie-Hoffmann-Straße ("Ottilie Hoffmann Street"). The street sign carries the additional inscription: "Ottilie Hoffmann (1835-1925) Founder of the 'German Women's League for an Alcohol-free Society' and of the Ottilie Hoffmann houses in Bremen" ("Ottilie Hoffmann (1835–1925) Gründerin des Deutschen Frauenbundes für alkoholfreie Kultur und der Ottilie-Hoffmann-Häuser in Bremen").

Since 1987, there has been a bronze figure of Ottilie Hoffmann by the local sculptor Jürgen Cominotto in the Urich Place ("Ulrichsplatz") on the edge of the Ostertor quarter.
