= Luise Koch =

German educator, politician and activist

- Born: 11 October 1860; Free City of Bremen
- Died: 14 March 1934 (aged 46); Bremen, Nazi Germany
- Occupations: Politician, Suffragist, Educator

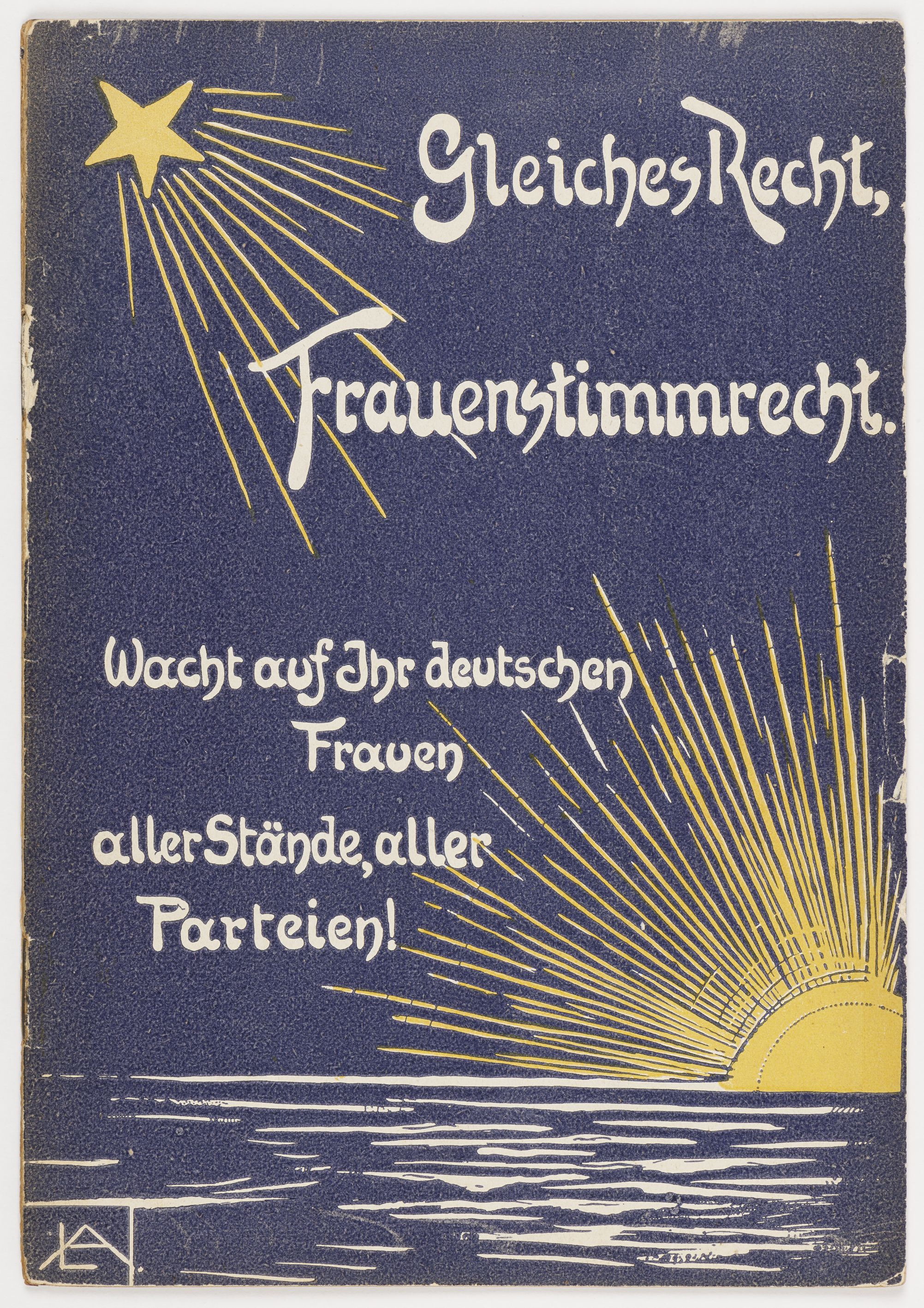
Brochure Wake Up You German Women of all social ranks of all parties!, 1907

Luise Koch (11 October 1860 Bremen – 14 March 1934 in Bremen) was a German educator, politician (DDP) and women's rights activist.

== Life ==
Koch was the daughter of the businessman Carl August Koch and his wife, the piano teacher Lina Koch. She attended a private girls' school.

In 1904 she founded the local chapter of the German Association for women's suffrage (Deutscher Verband für Frauenstimmrecht) and was from 1904 to 1919 chairwoman of the Bremen association (Bremer Frauenbewegung). In 1916 she was elected to the board of the German Reich Association for Women's Suffrage.

With the start of World War I, she called on the 600 members of the Association to engage in war work less for their own rights and more for the needs of family and country.

In 1916, Koch was elected to the board of the German Reich Association for Women's Suffrage. In 1917, she protested against "the forthcoming reform of the Bremer suffrage [...] that the right to vote in one direction referring only to the male sex". In 1918, she was a member of the new group Women in Bremen, and represented them in both women's suffrage associations and the Social Democrats.

In 1919, Koch was a member of the German Democratic Party (DDP). She represented the party in the Bremer National Constituent Assembly of 1919–20, however, she did not stand for the Bremen Parliament.

== Literature ==
- Bremer Nachrichten vom 11. Oktober 1930: Bremer Verein für Frauenstimmrecht.
