= Bremen state elections in the Weimar Republic =

German state elections

Elections in the Free Hanseatic City of Bremen (Freie Hansestadt Bremen) to its state parliament, the Bürgerschaft, during the Weimar Republic were held at variable intervals between 1919 and 1930. Results with regard to the total vote, the percentage of the vote won and the number of seats allocated to each party are presented in the tables below. On 31 March 1933, the sitting Bürgerschaft was dissolved by the Nazi-controlled central government and reconstituted to reflect the distribution of seats in the national Reichstag. The Bürgerschaft subsequently was formally abolished as a result of the "Law on the Reconstruction of the Reich" of 30 January 1934 which replaced the German federal system with a unitary state.

== 1919 ==
The 1919 Bremen state election was held on 9 March 1919 to elect the 200 members of the Bremen National Assembly.

Bremen 1919 state election
Party	Votes	%	Seats
Social Democratic Party of Germany	48,576	32.74	67
German Democratic Party	29,483	19.87	39
Independent Social Democratic Party of Germany	28,565	19.25	38
Landeswahlverband (DNVP-DVP)	19,896	13.41	29
Communist Party of Germany	11,358	7.65	15
Wirtschaftliche Verbände	10,496	7.07	12
Total	148,374	100.00	200
Valid votes	148,374	99.67	
Invalid/blank votes	493	0.33	
Total votes	148,867	100.00	
Registered voters/turnout	190,354	78.21	
Source: Elections in the Weimar Republic

== 1920 ==
The 1920 Bremen state election was held on 6 June 1920 to elect the 120 members of the Bürgerschaft.

Bremen 1920 state election
Party	Votes	%	Seats	+/–
Independent Social Democratic Party of Germany	52,395	30.75	37	–1
German People's Party	34,159	20.05	25	New
Social Democratic Party of Germany	31,137	18.27	22	–45
German Democratic Party	23,765	13.95	18	–21
German National People's Party	11,526	6.76	7	New
Wirtschaftliche Verbände	9,309	5.46	6	–6
Communist Party of Germany	7,600	4.46	5	–10
Centre Party	517	0.30	0	New
Total	170,408	100.00	120	–80
Valid votes	170,408	98.81		
Invalid/blank votes	2,046	1.19		
Total votes	172,454	100.00		
Registered voters/turnout	204,146	84.48		
Source: Elections in the Weimar Republic

== 1921 ==
The 1921 Bremen state election was held on 20 February 1921 to elect the 120 members of the Bürgerschaft.

Bremen 1921 state election
Party	Votes	%	Seats	+/–
German People's Party	41,039	23.26	30	+5
Social Democratic Party of Germany	39,196	22.22	28	+6
Independent Social Democratic Party of Germany	34,711	19.68	23	–14
German Democratic Party	29,601	16.78	21	+3
German National People's Party	11,784	6.68	7	0
Communist Party of Germany	10,960	6.21	6	+1
Wirtschaftliche Verbände	9,130	5.18	5	–1
Total	176,421	100.00	120	0
Valid votes	176,421	99.73		
Invalid/blank votes	479	0.27		
Total votes	176,900	100.00		
Registered voters/turnout	212,064	83.42		
Source: Elections in the Weimar Republic

== 1923 ==
The 1923 Bremen state election was held on 18 November 1923 to elect the 120 members of the Bürgerschaft.

Bremen 1923 state election
Party	Votes	%	Seats	+/–
Social Democratic Party of Germany	51,096	29.08	36	+8
German People's Party	35,460	20.18	26	–4
Communist Party of Germany	28,115	16.00	18	+12
German Democratic Party	22,313	12.70	16	–5
German National People's Party	18,379	10.46	12	+5
DVFP and NSDAP United List	10,963	6.24	7	New
Wirtschaftliche Verbände	9,406	5.35	5	0
Total	175,732	100.00	120	0
Valid votes	175,732	99.60		
Invalid/blank votes	711	0.40		
Total votes	176,443	100.00		
Registered voters/turnout	221,515	79.65		
Source: Elections in the Weimar Republic

== 1924 ==
The 1924 Bremen state election was held on 7 December 1924 to elect the 120 members of the Bürgerschaft.

Bremen 1924 state election
Party	Votes	%	Seats	+/–
Social Democratic Party of Germany	66,065	36.25	46	+10
German People's Party	28,536	15.66	19	–7
German Democratic Party	21,527	11.81	14	–2
German National People's Party	16,342	8.97	10	–2
Communist Party of Germany	15,989	8.77	9	–9
Hausbesitzer	12,560	6.89	8	New
National Socialist Freedom Movement	7,432	4.08	4	New
DVP and DNVP in Bremerhaven	5,164	2.83	4	New
Centre Party	3,612	1.98	2	New
Bodenreformer	1,997	1.10	1	New
Landeswahlverband Bremen-Landgebiet	1,864	1.02	2	New
Bürgerliche Vereinigung Vegesack	1,171	0.64	1	New
Total	182,259	100.00	120	0
Valid votes	182,259	99.03		
Invalid/blank votes	1,789	0.97		
Total votes	184,048	100.00		
Registered voters/turnout	229,308	80.26		
Source: Elections in the Weimar Republic

== 1927 ==
The 1927 Bremen state election was held on 13 November 1927 to elect the 120 members of the Bürgerschaft.

Bremen 1927 state election
Party	Votes	%	Seats	+/–
Social Democratic Party of Germany	80,838	40.34	50	+4
Einheitsliste (DVP-DNVP-NSFB-WV)	57,728	28.80	35	+16
German Democratic Party	20,267	10.11	12	–2
Communist Party of Germany	19,269	9.61	10	+1
Hausbesitzer	15,356	7.66	10	+2
Centre Party	4,040	2.02	2	0
Bodenreformer	1,854	0.93	1	0
Reich Party for Civil Rights and Deflation	1,064	0.53	0	New
Total	200,416	100.00	120	0
Valid votes	200,416	99.18		
Invalid/blank votes	1,655	0.82		
Total votes	202,071	100.00		
Registered voters/turnout	242,913	83.19		
Source: Elections in the Weimar Republic

== 1930 ==
The 1930 Bremen state election was held on 30 November 1930 to elect the 80 members of the Bürgerschaft.

Bremen 1930 state election
Party	Votes	%	Seats	+/–
Social Democratic Party of Germany	62,565	30.96	40	–10
Nazi Party	51,327	25.40	32	New
German People's Party	25,274	12.51	15	New
Communist Party of Germany	21,692	10.73	12	+2
German National People's Party	11,475	5.68	6	New
Hausbesitzer	8,731	4.32	5	–10
German State Party	8,340	4.13	5	New
Centre Party	4,238	2.10	2	0
Reich Party of the German Middle Class	3,362	1.66	2	New
Conservative People's Party	1,894	0.94	1	New
Christian Social People's Service	1,386	0.69	0	New
Communist Party of Germany (Opposition)	799	0.40	0	New
Vegesacker Gemeinschaftsliste	544	0.27	0	New
Bürgerliche Liste für Allgemeinwohl	442	0.22	0	New
Total	202,069	100.00	120	0
Valid votes	202,069	99.18		
Invalid/blank votes	1,669	0.82		
Total votes	203,738	100.00		
Registered voters/turnout	261,790	77.82		
Source: Elections in the Weimar Republic
