= Verena Rodewald =

German campaigner and politician (1866–1937)

- Born: Henriette Marie Verena Rodewald; 5 August 1866; Bremen, Germany
- Died: 4 December 1937 (aged 71); Bremen, Germany
- Occupations: Women's rights campaigner politician
- Political party: DVP
- Parent(s): Hermann Georg Rodewald (1814–1891); Marie Christine Verena Gildemeister (1840–1914)

Verena Rodewald (5 August 1866 – 4 December 1937) was a German women's rights campaigner and politician (DVP).

== Biography ==
=== Family provenance ===
Henriette Marie Verena Rodewald was born (and slightly more than seventy-one years later died) in Bremen. She was born into one of the city's leading mercantile families, the third of her parents' six recorded children. Hermann Georg Rodewald (1814–1891), her father, like his father before him, was an internationally connected businessman. Her mother, born Marie Christine Verena Gildemeister (1840–1914), came from another of the city's leading families, and was a cousin of the journalist-politician (and four times mayor of Bremen), Otto Gildemeister (1823–1902). As she grew up the family lived at Kohlkökerstraße 10, close to the city centre. Verena's younger brother, Hermann Rodewald, later came to prominence as a merchant and senator.

=== Training ===
After starting out at an elementary school Verena Rodewald switched to the girls' school of Helene Laweg und Sophie Petr. She then followed the Gymnasium (secondary school) course for women in Berlin between 1897 and 1899. The Gymnasium (secondary school system) was designed to prepare students – under most circumstances only male students – for admission to a university. In 1901 she passed the Abitur (school final exam) at Bremen's Altes Gymnasium (boys' secondary school). There seems to have been an acceptance, by this time, that she was unlikely ever to marry, and the alternative path would have involved finding a respectable career, such as teaching. With the full support – emotionally and financially – of her family she attended the universities of Berlin, Kiel and Heidelberg, studying Germanistics, Anglistics, Philosophy and Philology. Sources are silent over whether she was every permitted to conclude her undergraduate studies by obtaining a first degree. It is known, however, that in 1908 Verena Rodewald received her doctorate from the University of Heidelberg. Her dissertation concerned the use of the "aside" as a device in German theatre. Rodewald was one of the first women anywhere in the German Empire to be permitted to receive a doctorate. It is perhaps a sign both of the hurdles she had to overcome and of the extent to which her parents were willing and able to support her financially that by the time she received her doctorate she was 42.

=== Women's rights ===
Instead of launching herself in a paid professional role, Rodewald now returned from Heidelberg to Bremen where she became a public campaigner for women's rights, with a particular focus of her own on questions surrounding education. The next two years were devoted to co-founding the Bremen "Frauenstadtbund", an umbrella organisation embracing, at the outset, 15 different women's organisations, such as local branches of the League for Protection of Mothers and Sexual reform ("Deutscher Bund für Mutterschutz und Sexualreform") and of the German Association for Women's Voting rights ("Deutscher Verband für Frauenstimmrecht"). The Bremen "Frauenstadtbund", of which in 1910 she became the first president, thereby came to represent around 600 women. Rodewald led it between 1910 and 1915, and then again between 1917 and 1925. (Note: Rodewald's successor as president of the Bremen "Frauenstadtbund" was Guste Schepp-Merkel (1886-1967).) During her second term in office the "Frauenstadtbund" changed its name, in 1923, to "Bremer Frauenverein" (BDF)". By 1925 the number of Bremen women's organisations affiliated to it had increased from 15 to 43. Along with the associations already mentioned, these included the "Bremen Women's Club of 1908", the "Bremen [anti-drunkenness] Moderation Association" ("Bremer Mäßigkeitsverein") and other temperance organisations, the "Bremen Association for Improving Women's Clothing", the "Bremen local group" ("Ortsgruppe Bremen"), the "Business Association for Women Employees" ("Kaufmännischer Verband für weibliche Angestellte"), "Financial Support Fund for Weekly Carers", the "Bremen Sisterhood of the German Professional Nurses Professional Association", the "Association of Bremen midwives", the "Association of Bremen (women) Teachers", the "Association of Bremen (women) Painters", the "Women's Work Association", the "Mothers and Infants Refuge Association" ("Verein Mütter- und Säuglingsheim") and the Bremen branch of the anti-prostitution "International Abolitionist Federation". Verena Rodewald had become an important force in the Bremen women's movement, and she saw to it that the "Bremer Frauenverein" became too important a voice for the citizens and city authorities to ignore. In her first petition to the senate Verena Rodewald set out the goals of the Frauenstadtbund: "The Frauenstadtbund aims to unite all the Bremen women's organisations striving to advance the cause of women in respect of economic, social, legal and intellectual matters, and thereby to advance the common good. It exists to communicate their shared wishes and demands to the legislators." (Note: "Der Frauenstadtbund bezweckt die Vereinigung aller Organisationen bremischer Frauen, welche die Förderung des weiblichen Geschlechts in wirtschaftlicher, sozialer, rechtlicher und geistiger Hinsicht und dadurch die Förderung des Allgemeinwohls anstreben. Er will die Vertretung ihrer gemeinsamen Wünsche und Forderungen bei den gesetzgebenden Körperschaften übernehmen.") Rodewald went on to submit several further petitions both to the senate and to the Bürgerschaft (state parliament) in which she took hold of contemporary problems, and applied her characteristically stubborn persistence in working towards solutions. Her top priorities were in respect of emancipation and voting rights.

=== Politics ===
The so-called November Revolution (1918/19) started in the Imperial Navy at Wilhelmshaven and Kiel, quickly spreading across to the cities and towns of the newly republican German state. In Bremen it found expression in a soldiers', sailors' and workers' soviet which exercised a form of democratic control over the city territories for 25 days during January and February 1919, by means of a "Bürgerausschuss" ("Citizens' Committee"). Within the "Bürgerausschuss" were represented not just the revolutionaries but also conservative and liberal citizens. These demanded a "military ending" to the political uncertainty on which the revolutionary elements had evidently embarked. Many observers were surprised by Verena Rodewald's election to the citizens' committee. One explanation is that men from Bremen's prosperous middle classes, fearful of losing their privileged position in the face of revolution, suddenly found it expedient to create an ad hoc alliance with politically noisy middle-class women, if only to give greater numerical weight to their own political demands. The irony is not lost on commentators that it was precisely these same middle-class men who had hitherto vehemently opposed women's participation in politics. Nevertheless, everything about Verena Rodewald provided her backers with reassurance that in the event of a full-blown German re-run of Russia's October Revolution, she would be strident and effective in opposing any tides of Bolshevism from the east.

- "So, it was not a sense of what was right but the hope of catching a vote or two that delivered equal political rights for women in 1918."
- "So war es 1918 nicht das Gefühl der Gerechtigkeit, sondern Hoffnung auf Stimmenfang, die den Frauen die politische Gleichberechtigung brachte."
  Verena Rodewald, quoted by Christine Holzner-Rabe

In July 1919 the new German constitution confirmed the abolition of gender discrimination in respect of voting rights and entitlement to public office. Verena Rodewald was one of 18 female members elected to the newly inaugurated Bremen National Assembly three months earlier, on 9 March 1919. It was the first election held in which Bremen women were permitted to vote. Following the election of 6 June 1920, having produced and ratified a new constitution for the state, the National Assembly in effect mutated into a reformed version of the Bürgerschaft (Bremen state parliament). While still a National Assembly member, Rodewald opted for membership of the centre-right People's Party ("Deutsche Volkspartei" / DVP). She continued to sit as a DVP member of the Bürgerschaft till the abolition of democracy in 1933.

Rodewald became a member of the People's Party ("Deutsche Volkspartei" / DVP) party executive and led the Bremen DVP women's group until this was replaced, in 1921, by a Women's Committee chaired by the feminist activist and education reformer, Dr. Johanna Lürssen. During her fourteen years as a member of the Bremen state parliament she engaged with commitment in matters touching on women's rights and equality of rights and entitlements, but these were not the only topics in which she took an interest.

In her 37 substantial contributions to Bürgerschaft debates her comments were mainly on problems of the health system, culture and the arts, and on education and training. Although she was not a member of the parliamentary education group, she focused strongly on professional training for women and girls, and spoke out against one-dimensional role-allocations deriving from educational precepts. She warned that girls whose only training and experience was focused on housekeeping would never advance beyond a very one-sided orientation. One specific campaign in which she involved herself was for the preservation of women-only bathing establishments along the river. She campaigned for the inclusion of women delegates on the government boards of schools and for the provision of state aid to theatres. She was a strong advocate of religious education in the city's schools and called for the authorities to look after prostitutes who had become infected with sexually transmitted diseases through their work. She contributed a number of articles to "Roland", a regional party newspaper, dealing with women's right to vote, in which she criticised the attitudes of all the political parties, analysing the position as it then stood, and not fearing to impute some of the responsibility for the situation she criticised to women themselves.

At the beginning of 1933, exploiting the intensifying political polarisation and the resulting parliamentary deadlock, the Hitler government took power, and lost no time in transforming Germany into a one- party dictatorship. The DVP was now the "wrong party". Many of her party colleagues joined the National Socialist Party to sustain their political careers. Verena Rodewald preferred to withdraw from politics completely, retreating to lead a private life during her final years.

== Evaluation ==
To a twenty-first century observer Verena Rodewald's views provide a singular blend of extreme conservatism and the strikingly progressive. She was a highly intelligent, well-educated and combative woman, at once confident in her views and capable of singular humility, stubborn in pursuit of her objectives. It was a combination which, perhaps, marked her out from the outset for a career in politics and women's rights activism.
