= Robert Stamm =

German politician (1900–1937)

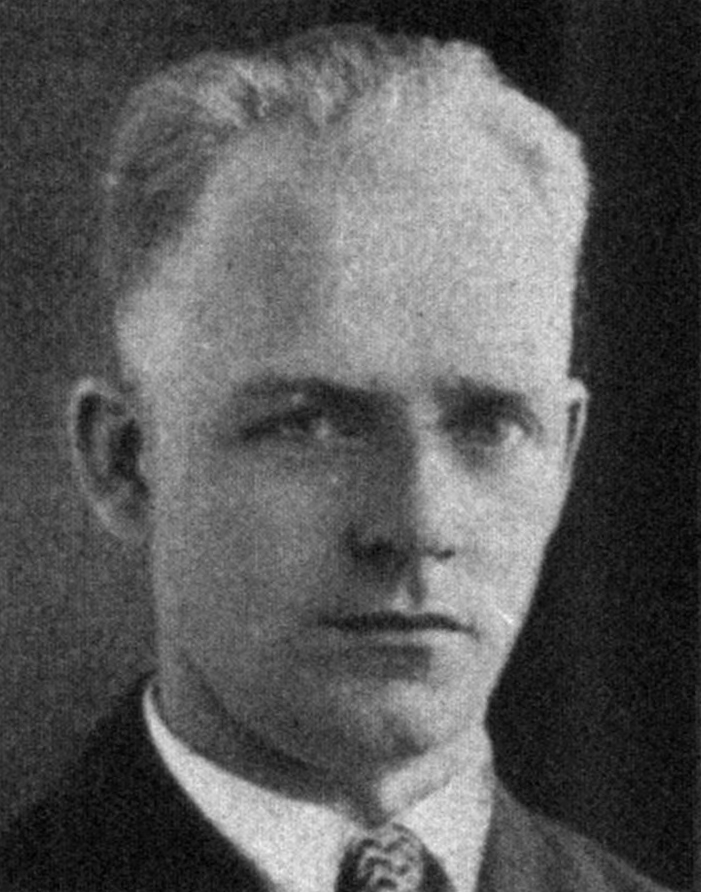
Stamm c. 1932

Robert Stamm (16 July 1900 – 4 November 1937) was a German politician, a Communist (KPD) member of the Reichstag from Bremen, and a victim of the Nazi régime.

Robert Stamm was born in Remscheid, in the Prussian Rhine Province. Already by the age of 14, he had become involved with the Socialist Youth in the Bergisches Land. He became a toolmaker, and in 1917, during his training, he associated himself with the Spartacist League around Karl Liebknecht and Rosa Luxemburg. In 1920 he took part in the struggle against the Kapp Putsch. In 1926, he became the editor of various Communist newspapers in the Rhine-Ruhr area.

From 1931 to 1933, Stamm led the KPD's Northwest District in Bremen. To avoid his looming arrest, he gave up his political activities for the time being and moved to Hanover in May 1933. The following year, he once again felt obliged to hurry to another city and he went to Berlin. In the end, though, none of his running helped. On 27 March 1935, Stamm was arrested by the Gestapo. At the Volksgerichtshof, he was found guilty of conspiracy to commit treason, and was sentenced to death. Stamm was beheaded on 4 November 1937 at Plötzensee Prison in Berlin.

The FDGB-Kulturhaus 'Robert Stamm' in Biberschlag, Thuringia, is named after him.
