= Käthe Lübeck =

German politician (1907–1984)

Käthe Popall (born Käthe Fürst: 15 February 1907 – 23 May 1984) was a Bremen politician (KPD). She was the first female member of the Bremen senate.

Like many left wing politicians of her generation she spent most of the Nazi years in prison. During that time she was divorced by Hans Lübeck (who also spent many of those years in state detention). She had met Hans Lübeck in 1928 and married him shortly after that, with the result that sources covering the first part of her political career tend to identify her as Käthe Lübeck. She married Reinhold Popall in January 1946: sources covering the second half of her life therefore identify her as Käthe Popall.

== Life ==
=== Provenance and early years ===
Käthe Fürst was born in Bremen, one of the six recorded children of a manual labourer. On leaving school she initially took unskilled work, but following a commercial apprenticeship she worked as a book keeper, employed by "Vorwärts", a consumer co-operative. However, after she married, in 1928, she was "released" from her employment with "Vorwärts", spending the next few years unemployed apart from periodic assignments as a casual worker at the jute mill in Bremen's Walle quarter.

=== Politics ===
She was not quite 12 when war ended in military defeat for Germany, followed by a wave of revolutions across the country and a new political structure which was in many ways far more democratic than the previous one. In 1922 Käthe Fürst joined the Young Socialist Workers ("Sozialistische Arbeiter-Jugend" / SAJ) and the Social Democratic Party ("Sozialdemokratische Partei Deutschlands" / SPD). Working at the jute mill she was influenced by Hannes Koschnick, at that time secretary of the Revolutionary trades union opposition ("Revolutionäre Gewerkschafts Opposition" / RGO) movement and editor of the "Workers' Newspaper" The RGO was for most purposes a communist trades union confederation, although it frequently found itself in vigorous disagreement with the (increasingly Moscow-influenced) Communist Party over practical matters. It was also during this period that, increasingly, she was influenced by Robert Stamm, district leader for Northwest Bremen of the Communist Party. In 1927 she switched her membership from the young socialist workers to the Young Communists. Both Koschnick and Stamm saw to it that she attended courses at the trades union and party training academies. In 1929 she joined the Communist Party itself and in 1930, still aged only 23, she was elected as a Communist Party member to the Bremen regional parliament ("Bremische Bürgerschaft"). By 1930 she had also become a member of the works council at the jute mill. Her membership of the "Bremische Bürgerschaft" lasted only till 20 March 1931 because, according to one source, the party instructed her to relocate away from Bremen.

In 1927 or 1928 she met a fellow member of the Young Communists, Hans Lübeck, whom she married shortly thereafter. In 1931 the two of them relocated to Düsseldorf, where she worked with the Lower Rhineland regional party leadership team ("Bezirksleitung Niederrhein") of the RGO. However, by the summer of 1931 she was in Halle, employed at the consumer-operative there. At the start of 1932 she was appointed a party leader organiser for the women's section of the Young Communists in Halle. In the autumn of 1932, she travelled with her husband to Moscow, but according to one source her wish to study at the "Lenin" Party Academy there came to nothing because she failed the entrance exam. Other sources imply strongly that she did indeed study at the party academy. Either way, when the Nazis took power in Germany, Käthe Lübeck was in Moscow.

=== Nazi years ===
The new government lost no time in transforming Germany into a one-party dictatorship. After the Reichstag fire at the end of February 1933 communists, in particular, were targets of officially sanctioned persecution. Many were arrested or fled abroad. Käthe Lübeck nevertheless returned from Moscow to Germany at the end of 1934, making her base in Berlin where she worked illegally for the Communist Party leadership, her responsibilities centred on "women's work" ("Frauenarbeit"). On 27 March 1935 she was arrested. Other party comrades arrested at the same time included Adolf Rembte, Robert Stamm and Max Maddalena. Unlike these others, Käthe Lübeck would outlive the Nazi regime. The trial process lasted two years, during which time Hans Lübeck, who was himself in prison between 1934 and 1936, divorced her, which hurt her terribly. She never saw him again. Eventually, on 4 June 1937 she was sentenced by the special People's Court to a twelve year prison term.

Initially she was held at the women's prison at Lübeck-Lauerhof. In 1941 she was transferred to Silesia, held in concentration camps at Jauer and Schweidnitz. Finally, from March 1945, she was held at the large Waldheim detention centre near Chemnitz. For much of the time she was held in solitary detention, but she was able to meet with fellow detainees when she was used for forced labour. Early in May 1945 she was released by allied forces. That month marked the end of the war. The country was to be divided into military occupation zones. Käthe Lübeck was released in the Soviet occupation zone: because her record of communist activism in the 1930s the authorities were keen that she should stay and help rebuild a post Nazi society, but she was keen to get home to Bremen, desperate to discover if her mother was still alive. Her mother was alive together with one elder sister. Their other siblings had died in the war.

=== British occupation zone / German Federal Republic ===
On 19 January 1946 she married Reinhold Popall who had worked illegally for the Communist Party during the Nazi years until 1935 when he had received a 15 year prison sentence. Käthe Popall became the women's section leader for the party. She joined the local "Fight against Fascism association" ("Kampfgemeinschaft gegen den Faschismus"), an organisation dominated by Communists and Social Democrats which at this stage was the only organisation with any resemblance to a political party that the British occupying forces would permit to operate. On 17 April 1946 she was appointed a member of the nominated Bremen regional parliament. In the first free election to that body, held on 13 October 1946, she was elected to membership of the Bremen Bürgerschaft (regional parliament), in which she served as vice president of the small Communist Party group in the assembly.

As early as 23 July 1945 the British military authorities installed Käthe Popall as Bremen's first ever female senator. She served under Mayor Vagts, between August 1946 and February 1948, as the senator with responsibility for health matters. After Vagts resigned, to be succeeded by Wilhelm Kaisen, Käthe Popall became a member of the Kaisen senate, re-elected to senate membership in the local election of 28 November 1946. Again she was responsible for health matters and, later, also for welfare issues. She spoke out to insist that young people born after 1919 should not be held responsible for the Nazi dictatorship that took over during and after 1933. She also campaigned for reform of the Abortion laws (§218 of the old constitution which reappeared in the post war Wet German constitution), urging that the abortion should be performed according to medical criteria and not according to political beliefs. Her welfare brief also gave her responsibility for refugees from parts of Germany that, since 1945, had become part of Poland and the Soviet Union, arranging accommodation and ensuring rapid settlement for those who had fetched up in Bremen.

Popall was an important member of the Bremen Women's Movement. In 1946 she joined with Agnes Heineken, Anna Stiegler, Anna Klara Fischer and Irmgard Enderle to become a founding member of the Bremen Women's Committee ("Bremer Frauenausschuss"), widely recognised as a non-party non-denominational umbrella organisation for women's organisations from all parts of society in the city-state. Till 1951 she participated on the executive board.

Local elections in October 1947 saw an increase in votes for the Bremen Democratic People's Party and a decline in support for the Communist Party. In the western occupation zones the Communist Party was losing credibility because of the political machinations taking place in the Soviet occupation zone. Popall retained her seat, but the Communists were no longer part of the governing coalition and on 22 January 1948, along with other communist senators, she resigned from the senate. Mayor Kaisen was lavish in his tribute: "So if this is the first time in the history of the Berlin Senate that it found itself with a woman elected to its ranks, this woman brilliantly vindicated the experiment". Popall remained a member of the Bremen Bürgerschaft (regional parliament), representing the Communist Party until 1956 when, in the context of wider Cold War tensions, the Communist Party was itself banned in the German Federal Republic (West Germany) (of which the British occupation zone had become a part in May 1949). By 1956 Käthe Popall had already become politically isolated and relatively inactive on the wider stage, reflecting increasingly bitter internal conflicts within the party.

Following the Berlin Blockade of 1948/49 the three western occupation zones were relaunched, in May 1949, as the German Federal Republic (West Germany). In response the Soviet sponsored German Democratic Republic (East Germany) was relaunched in October 1949 in what had, till that point, been administered as the Soviet occupation zone. There was no immediate acceptance in Moscow that the opportunity to create a Soviet sponsored German state including the western occupation zones had been closed off for good. Inside East Germany the ruling party became increasingly uncompromising in its interpretation and application of Stalinist communism, especially after the quickly suppressed 1953 uprising. This was reflected in West Germany where the Communist Party had not been rebranded and uncompromising Stalinist-style paranoia and central control over party matters was the order of the times. At the start of 1952 the Bremen branch of the Communist Party initiated an attack against "Enemies of the Party, Infiltrators and Opportunists" ("Parteifeinde, Agenten und Opportunisten") in its ranks. The Popalls were criticised in Bremen's party newspaper, "Tribüne der Demokratie" ("Tribunes of Democracy"): "For years, they have had no real links to the party. They have defamed party officials and undermined trust in East Germany and in the Soviet Union". In a move reminiscent of the internal party battles of the later 1920s, in 1952 both Käthe and Reinhold Popall were subjected to a ban from serving on party committees. In 1952 Reinhold Popall was expelled from the party, and Käthe Popall was instructed by the party leadership to divorce him. Opposition from the party membership in Bremen is apparently what prevented her own expulsion from the party when she failed to separate from her husband. Käthe Popall received "only a reprimand": her own party membership ended only when the party itself was banned in West Germany, in 1956.

By 1956 Käthe Popall's political career was effectively over. In 1967 or earlier she relocated away from Bremen with her family to Ottweiler in the Saarland, where their daughter grew up. The couple were active in the Workers' Welfare (AWO) and Friends of Nature movements. Reinhold Popall died in 1981. Back in Bremen the President of the Bremen Senate was by now Hans Koschnick whose father had played an important part in the political awakening of Käthe Lübeck (as she was at the time) more than fifty years earlier when she had worked at the jute mill. In 1982 Koschnick organised a reception in her honour at the Bremen City Hall.

Early in 1984, already suffering from cancer, she moved back to Bremen where, a few months later, she died.
