= Timeline of Bremen =

Coordinates: 53.075833°N 8.8075°E

The following is a timeline of the history of the city of Bremen, Germany.

== Prior to 19th century ==
- 787 CE – Catholic diocese of Bremen formed.
- 848 CE – Transfer of the archiepiscopal see of Hamburg to Bremen.
- 965 CE – Adaldag archbishop of Hamburg-Bremen given ruling powers by Otto I, Holy Roman Emperor
- 1186 – Frederick I, Holy Roman Emperor grants privilegium to the townspeople.
- 1220s – Bremen Cathedral construction began.
- 1223 – Archbishopric relocated to Bremen from Hamburg.
- 1230 – Church of Our Lady rebuilt (approximate date).
- 1243 – St. Ansgarius church built (approximate date).
- 1247 – Location of Schlachte settled by local citizens and traders.
- 1283 – Bremen admitted to the Hanseatic League but was excluded in 1285.
- 1304 – "The commonalty rose against the patricians and drove them from the city."
- 1358 – Bremen re-admitted to the Hanseatic League.
- 1409 – Town Hall built.
- 1427 – Bremen re-excluded from the Hanseatic League.
- 1433 – Bremen re-admitted to the Hanseatic League.
- 1522 – The Reformation was introduced into Bremen.
- 1532 – Bremen joins the Schmalkaldic League.
- 1588 – Stadtwaage built.
- 1618 – Protestantism definitively proclaimed as the state religion.
- 1619 – Cloth-traders' guild hall built.
- 1630
  - Lübeck-Hamburg-Bremen defensive alliance formed.
  - Shipper's House built.
- 1644 – Frederick II of Denmark deposed by the Swedes.
- 1654 & 1666 – Swedish Wars on Bremen.
- 1675 – Bremen-Verden Campaign.
- 1682 – Bremen Exchange construction began of a single story building.
- 1720 – George I., elector of Hanover recognized Bremen as a free city.
- 1790 – City directory published.
- 1792 – Bremer Stadttheater (1792) (theatre) built.

== 19th century ==
- 1807 – Population: 36,041.
- 1806 – Bremen taken by the French.
- 1810 – Bremen becomes part of the French Empire.
- 1815 – Congress of Vienna restores its independence.
- 1823
  - Art Society founded.
  - St. John's Church rededicated as a Catholic church
- 1827 – Bremerhaven (seaport) established.
- 1847
  - Bremen Hauptbahnhof (main railway station) opens.
  - Wunstorf–Bremen railway opens.
- 1849 – Kunsthalle (art museum) built.
- 1857 – Norddeutscher Lloyd shipping company in business.
- 1862 – Population: 67,217.
- 1866 – Bremen joins the North German Confederation.
- 1867
  - Exchange built.
  - Oldenburg–Bremen railway opened.
  - Population: 74,574.
- 1868 – 10 April: Premiere of Brahm's German Requiem.
- 1871
  - End of Bremen independence, city becomes part of the German Empire.
  - Population: 82,969.
- 1872 – AG Weser in business.
- 1874 – Agricultural exhibition held.
- 1875
  - Kaiserbrucke (bridge) built.
  - Population: 102,499.
- 1876 – Horse tramway begins operating.
- 1878 – Post office built.
- 1885 – Population: 118,395.
- 1888
  - Bremen joins German Customs Union.
  - Bremen Hauptbahnhof (train station) re-built.
- 1890
  - Bremer Straßenbahn active.
  - Population: 124,955.
- 1892 – Electric tramway begins operating.
- 1893 – Bremer Vulkan shipbuilder in business.
- 1895 – Law courts built.
- 1900 – Population: 186,822; state 248,407.

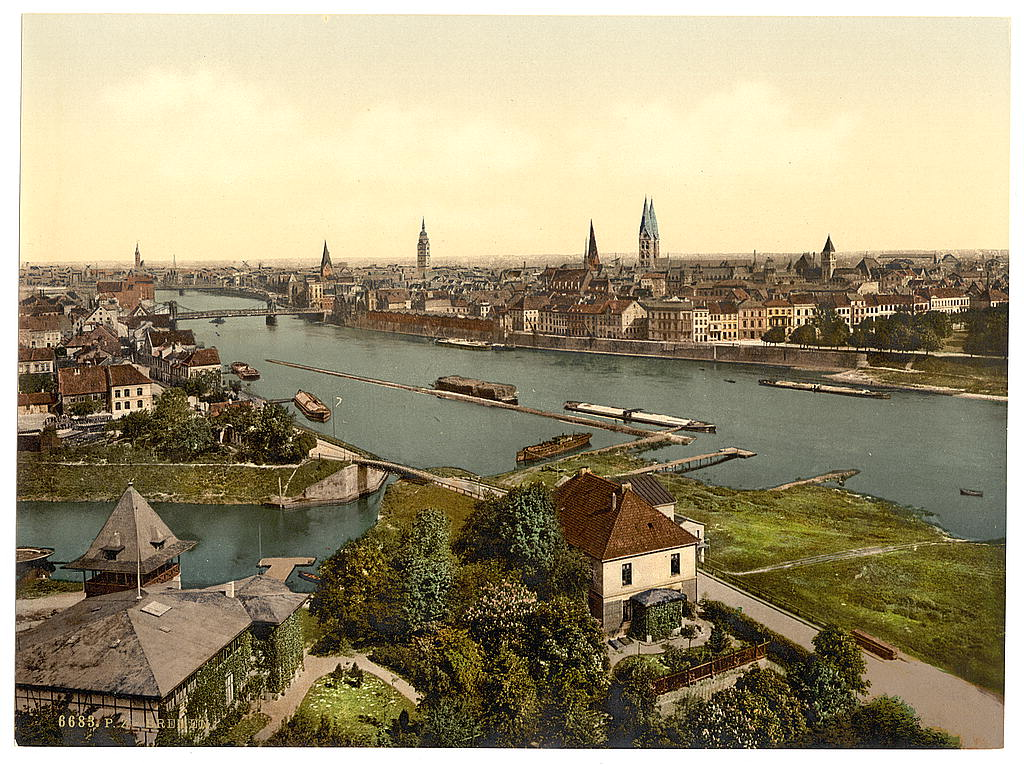
Bremen around 1900

== 20th century ==
=== 1900-1945 ===
- 1901 – Bremen Cathedral great restoration completed.
- 1902 – Kunsthalle (art museum) enlarged.
- 1905 – Population: 214,953; state 263,673.
- 1906 – Production of decaffeinated Kaffee Hag coffee begins.
- 1911 – Rathscafé built.
- 1913
  - Bremen Airport established.
  - New Town Hall and Theater am Goetheplatz built.
  - 20 June: Bremen school shooting.
- 1919 – Population: 257,923.
  - 1919 January 10: Bremen Soviet Republic is formed.
    - 1919 February 4: Bremen Soviet Republic is seized by the Weimar Republic
- 1920 – New constitution put into effect.
- 1923 – Bremer Flugzeugbau aircraft manufactory in business.
- 1925 – Fahrzeugwerke Borgward automobile manufactory in business.
- 1928 – Population: 302,949.
- 1932 – Reichskolonialehrendenkmal (monument) unveiled.
- 1933
  - March: Nazis take control of executive Senate. Nazi Richard Markert becomes mayor.
  - May: Placed in a united Reich Governorship with Oldenburg under Carl Röver.
  - October: Bürgerschaft (state parliament) is dissolved.
- 1939
  - Aumund, Blumenthal, Fähr, Farge, Grohn, Hammersbeck, Lobbendorf, Rekum, Schönebeck, and Vegesack become part of city.
  - August: Polish libraries seized by the Gestapo.
  - September: Mass arrests of local Polish activists (see also Nazi crimes against the Polish nation).
  - Population: 431,800.
- 1940
  - May: Bombing of Bremen in World War II begins.
  - May: Bremen-Blumenthal forced labour camp for men established.
- 1942 – 2nd SS construction brigade (forced labour camp) established by the SS.
- 1943 – Bremen-Farge subcamp of the Neuengamme concentration camp established. The prisoners were mostly French, Polish and Soviet men.
- 1944
  - 15 April: 2nd SS construction brigade relocated to Berlin.
  - 2 August: Bremen-Hindenburgkaserne subcamp of Neuengamme established. Its prisoners were Jewish women.
  - 16 August: Bremen-Neuenland subcamp of Neuengamme established. Its prisoners were mostly French and Soviet men.
  - August: Bremen-Blumenthal subcamp of Neuengamme established. Its prisoners were mostly Belgian, French, Polish, Soviet and Jewish men.
  - 26 September: Bremen-Hindenburgkaserne subcamp of Neuengamme dissolved and Bremen-Obernheide subcamp established. Prisoners moved from Hindenburgkaserne to Obernheide.
  - 28 November: Bremen-Neuenland subcamp of Neuengamme dissolved and Bremen-Osterort subcamp established. Prisoners moved from Neuenland to Osterort.
  - 25/26 December: Bremen-Schützenhof subcamp of Neuengamme established. Its prisoners were mostly Jewish men.

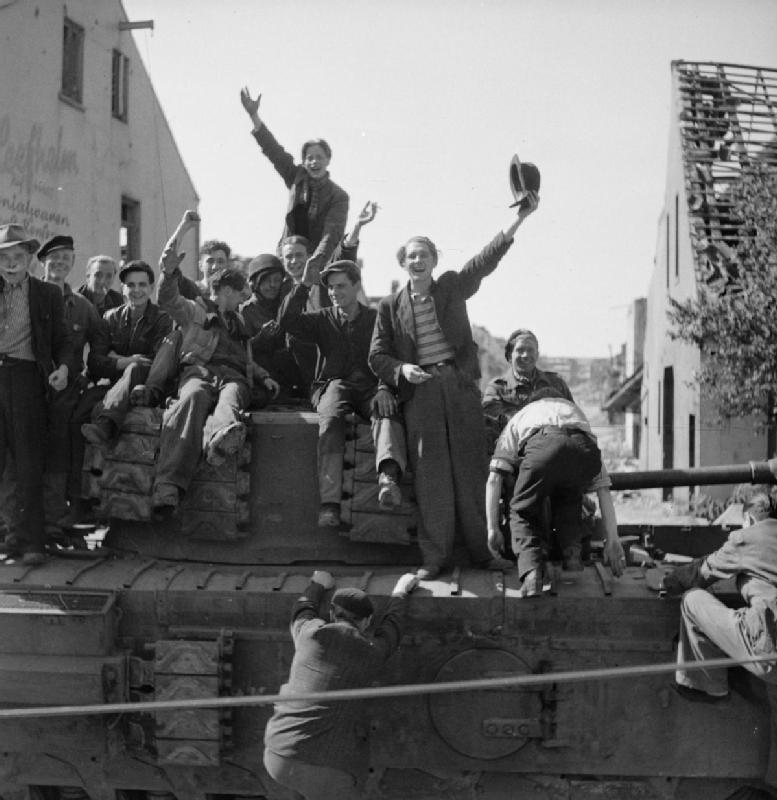
Liberated French and Dutch slave workers following the British capture of the city in 1945

- 1945
  - 4 April: Bremen-Obernheide subcamp of Neuengamme dissolved. Prisoners sent on a death march to Uesen.
  - 6 April: Bremen-Osterort subcamp of Neuengamme dissolved. Prisoners moved to the Bremen-Farge subcamp.
  - 7–9 April: Blumenthal and Schützenhof subcamps of Neuengamme dissolved. Prisoners moved to the Bremen-Farge subcamp.
  - 10 April: Bremen-Farge subcamp of Neuengamme dissolved. Prisoners either sent on death marches to Bremervörde and Sandbostel or deported by train towards the Bergen-Belsen concentration camp.
  - 22 April: Bombing of Bremen in World War II ends.
  - Late April: City captured by British forces.
  - Wilhelm Kaisen becomes mayor.

=== 1946–1990s ===
- 1947 – State of Bremen reestablished.
- 1949 – Becomes a constituent state of West Germany.
- 1956 – Population: 507,952.
- 1964 – Bremen-Arena opens.
- 1966
  - 28 January: Airplane crash.
  - Bürgerschaft (parliament) building and Zoo Bremen open.
- 1983 – Bremer Shakespeare Company founded.
- 1986 – Bremen TV tower erected.
- 1990 – Population: 551,219.
- 1992 – Deutsche Kammerphilharmonie Bremen active.
- 1999
  - 6 June: Bremen state election, 1999 held.
  - Fatih Mosque, Bremen built.

== 21st century ==
- 2003
  - City hosts the 2003 European Karate Championships.
  - 25 May: Bremen state election, 2003 held.
- 2005 – Jens Böhrnsen becomes mayor.
- 2007 – 13 May: Bremen state election, 2007 held.
- 2010 – Bremen S-Bahn begins operating.
- 2011 – 22 May: Bremen state election, 2011 held.
- 2012 – Population: 547,976.
- 2014 – City hosts the 2014 World Karate Championships.
- 2015 – 10 May: 2015 Bremen state election
- 2015 – 17 July: Carsten Sieling becomes mayor.
- 2019 – 26 May: 2019 Bremen state election
- 2019 – 15 August: Andreas Bovenschulte becomes mayor.

== See also ==
- History of Bremen
- List of mayors of Bremen
- List of administrative units in Bremen

== Bibliography ==
=== in English ===
- Thomas Nugent (1749), "Bremen", The Grand Tour, vol. 2: Germany and Holland, London: S. Birt, hdl:2027/mdp.39015030762572
- David Brewster, ed. (1830). "Bremen". Edinburgh Encyclopædia. Edinburgh: William Blackwood.
- Edward Augustus Domeier (1830), "Bremen", Descriptive Road-Book of Germany, London: Samuel Leigh, hdl:2027/hvd.hx167e
- Charles Knight, ed. (1866). "Bremen". Geography. English Cyclopaedia. Vol. 2. London: Bradbury, Evans, & Co. hdl:2027/nyp.33433000064794.
- "Bremen", Bradshaw's Illustrated Hand-book to Germany, London: W.J. Adams & Sons, 1873
- "Bremen". Handbook for North Germany. London: J. Murray. 1877.
- John Ramsay McCulloch (1880), "Bremen", in Hugh G. Reid (ed.), A Dictionary, Practical, Theoretical and Historical of Commerce and Commercial Navigation, London: Longmans, Green, and Co.
- Norddeutscher Lloyd (1896), "Bremen", Guide through Germany, Austria-Hungary, Italy, Switzerland, France, Belgium, Holland and England, Berlin: J. Reichmann & Cantor, OCLC 8395555
- "Bremen". Chambers's Encyclopaedia. London. 1901.
- "Bremen", Northern Germany (15th ed.), Leipzig: Karl Baedeker, 1910, OCLC 78390379
- "Bremen (city)" . Encyclopædia Britannica. Vol. 4 (11th ed.). 1910. pp. 493–494.
- Benjamin Vincent (1910), "Bremen", Haydn's Dictionary of Dates (25th ed.), London: Ward, Lock & Co.
- Joseph Lins (1913). "Bremen". Catholic Encyclopedia. New York.
- Wilson King (1914), Chronicles of Three Free Cities: Hamburg Bremen, Lübeck, London: Dent
- Robert Lee (1999). "Urban Labor Markets, In-Migration, and Demographic Growth: Bremen, 1815–1914". Journal of Interdisciplinary History. 30 (3): 437–473. JSTOR 206909.
- Robert Lee & Peter Marschalck (2002). "Port-city legacy: urban demographic change in the Hansestadt Bremen, 1815-1910". In Richard Lawton & W. Robert Lee (eds.). Population and Society in Western European Port Cities, c.1650-1939. Liverpool University Press. ISBN 978-0-85323-435-7.

=== in German ===
- "Stadt Bremen". Topographia Saxoniae Inferioris. Topographia Germaniae (in German). Frankfurt. 1653. p. 60+.
- Karl von Hegel (1891). "Bremen". Städte und Gilden der germanischen Völker im Mittelalter (in German). Vol. 2. Leipzig: Duncker & Humblot. hdl:2027/wu.89094689700 – via HathiTrust.
- "Bremen". Brockhaus' Konversations-Lexikon (in German) (14th ed.). Leipzig: Brockhaus. 1896. hdl:2027/njp.32101064064452.
- Wilhelm von Bippen (1904), Geschichte der Stadt Bremen, Halle: C.E. Müller, OL 20530009M
- P. Krauss und E. Uetrecht, ed. (1913). "Bremen". Meyers Deutscher Städteatlas [Meyer's Atlas of German Cities] (in German). Leipzig: Bibliographisches Institut.
- Bremen [Chronicles of the German Cities]. Die Chroniken der Deutschen Städte (in German). Vol. 37. Leipzig: S. Hirzel. 1968.
