= Uesen =

Coordinates: 53.0017°N 9.0499°E

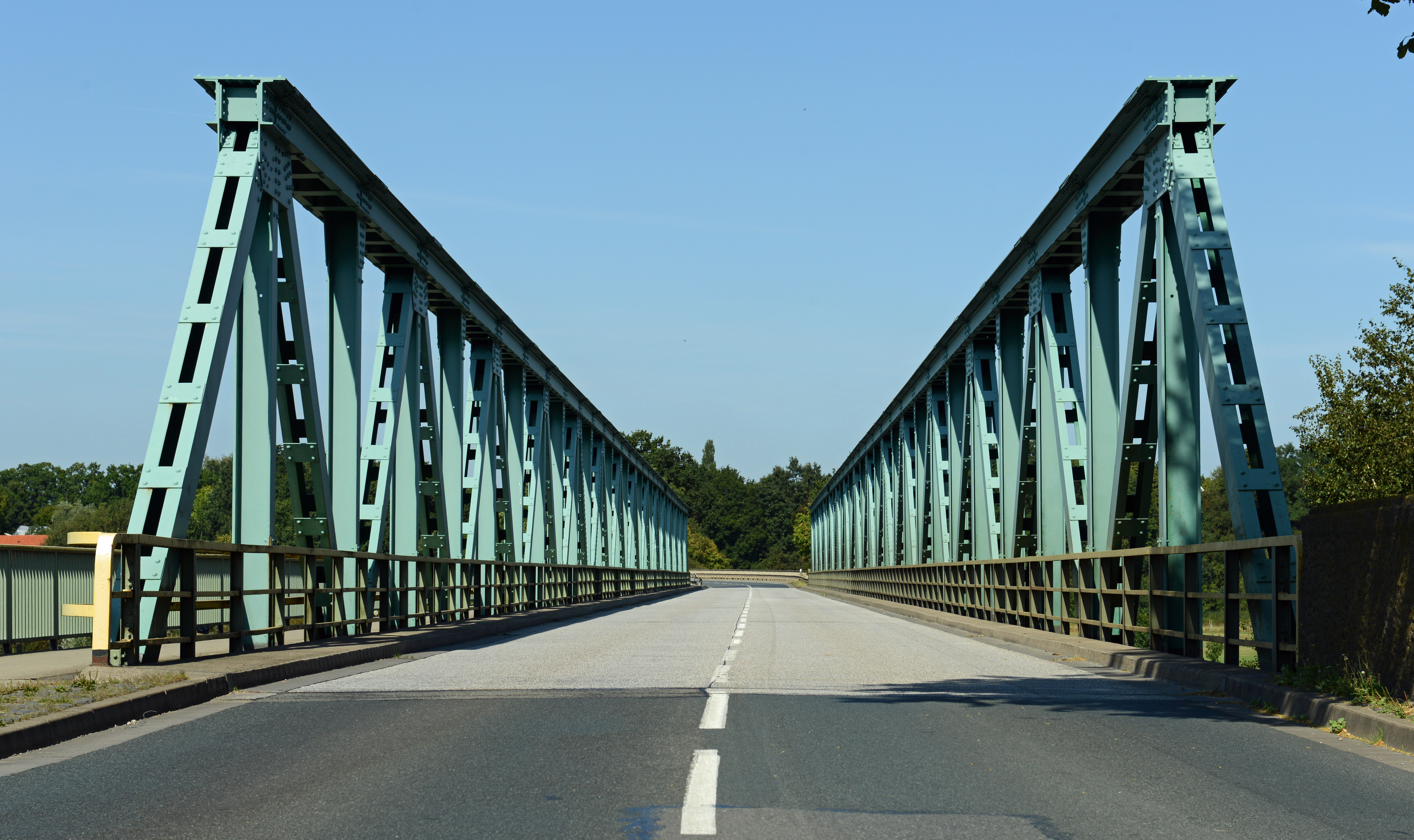

Uesen is a village in and a district of Achim, a town located in Lower Saxony (Germany). It is part of the district of Verden and the river Weser is very close. Uesen is situated between the eastern part of Baden and the western city of Achim.

== History ==
On the site of the present Uesen existed an urn cemetery from the late Bronze Age. The urns are now kept in the Lower Saxony State Museum in Hanover and in the Grundschule Uesen. Furthermore, the existence of settlement trails from the Saxon period has been proved, but the present village was founded in the Middle Ages.

Since the middle of the 17th century there has been a windmill on the Geestrücken of the Weser in Uesen. In the middle of the 18th century, today's 29m high "Dutch Gallery" windmill with two floors and a thatched roof was built to replace the existing Bockwindmühle. The windmill was in operation until 1965 and since 1969 it has been a museum mill.

At the beginning of the 20th century, asparagus was grown on the edge of the dunes on Am Ostfeld and Am Westerfeld, which was marketed supraregionalally in Bremen and northern Germany. Since the mid-20th century there has been residential development on the site.

On July 1, 1972, Uesen was integrated into the city of Achim.

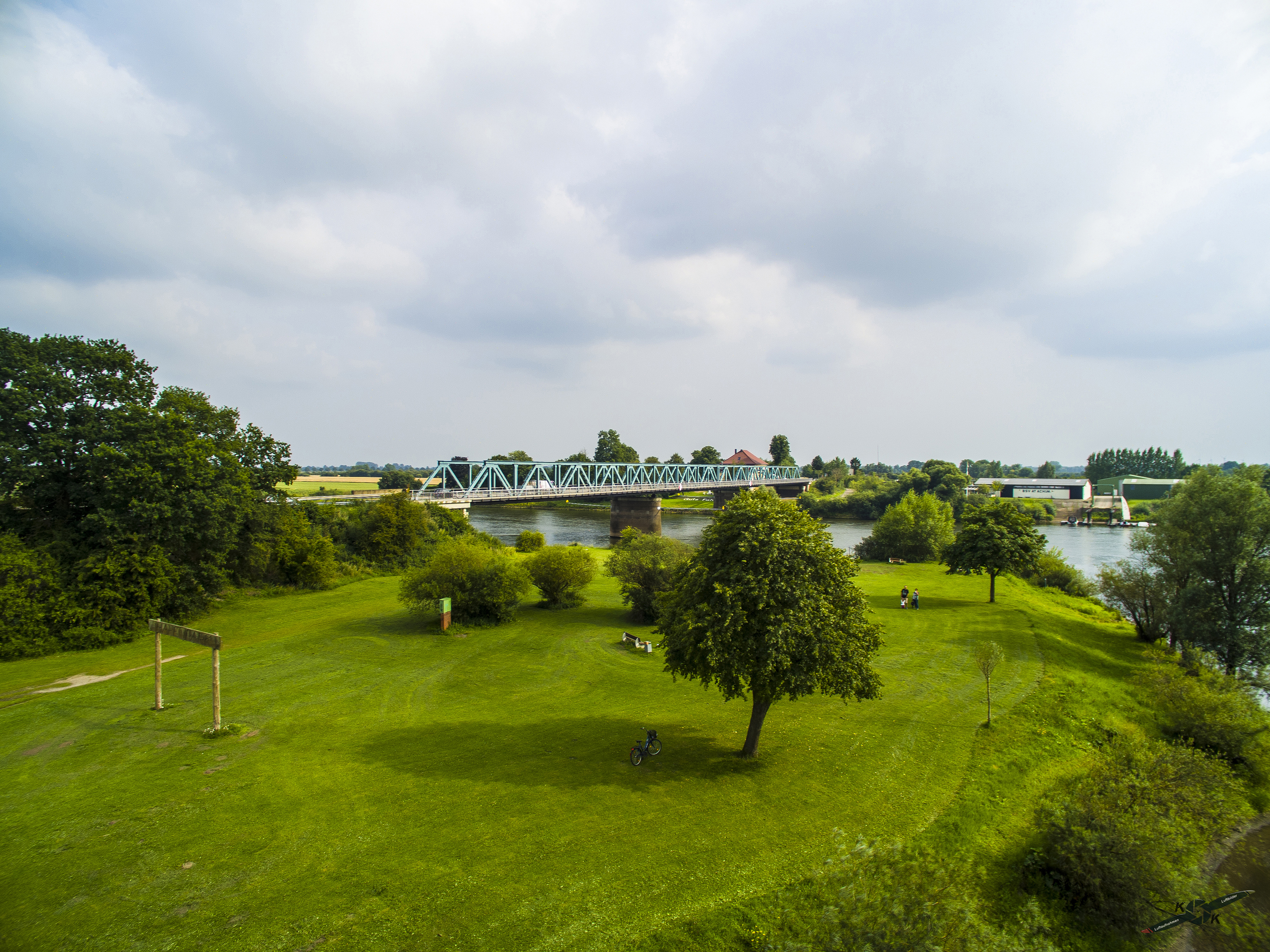
Weserbrücke (bridge across the river Weser)

== Economy and infrastructure ==
The "Weserbrücke" is a bridge across the river Weser. It is part of the important connection between Achim and Thedinghausen, forming part of the L156 road. The bridge was built in 1951, after the former bridge from 1928 was destroyed at the end of World War II.

There are a Grundschule and a public swimming pool in Uesen.

Many big companies have premises in the industrial estate Achim-Uesen, for example companies like Dräxlmeier and H.F.Wiebe.

== Associations / Clubs ==
- TSV Uesen e.V. von 1924 (gymnastics and sports club)
- Freiwillige Feuerwehr Achim-Uesen (the voluntary fire brigade)
- Schützenverein Uesen 1955 e.V. (rifle club)
- Tennisgemeinschaft Uesen von 1976 e.V. (tennis club)

== Literature ==
- Hans Höppner: "Die Bienenfauna der Dünen und Weserabhänge zwsichen Uesen und Baden." paper of the scientific association Bremen, 15(2), Bremen 1901, p. 231-255.
