= History of Bremen =

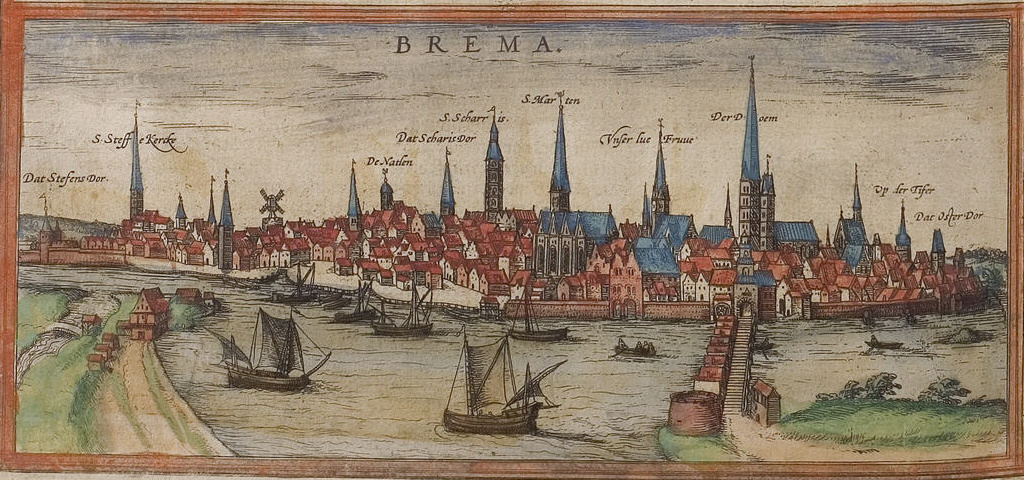
Bremen, 16th century

For most of its 1,200 year history, Bremen was an independent city within the confederal jurisdiction of the Holy Roman Empire. In the late Middle Ages, its governing merchant guilds were at the centre of the Hanseatic League, which sought to monopolise the North Sea and Baltic trade. To establish and confirm its independence, the city had to contend first with the Prince-Archbishop of Bremen, and then with the Swedes, who had become the masters of the surrounding, former episcopal, duchies after the Thirty Years' War.

In the late nineteenth century Bremen was drawn by Prussia into the German Empire. Thanks to new sea wharves and anchorage at Bremerhaven, the city became Germany's main port of emigration to the Americas, and an entrepôt for her late developing colonial trade. The Norddeutscher Lloyd (NDL) was founded in Bremen in 1857 and it later became one of the world's leading shipping companies.

In the twentieth century, Bremen, a broadly liberal and social-democratic city, lost its autonomy under the Hitler regime. After the devastations of World War Two, in which two thirds of the city's fabric were severely damaged, this autonomy was restored. Bremen became one of the founding Länder (or states) of the German Federal Republic. From the late 1950s, the post-war Wirtschaftswunder drew workers to the city from Turkey and Southern Europe, so that, combined with refugees resettled in the 21st century, around a third of Bremen's current population is of recent non-German origin.

== Early history ==
The marshes and moraines near Bremen have been settled since about 12,000 BC. Burial places and settlements in Bremen-Mahndorf and Bremen-Osterholz date back to the 7th century AD. Since the Renaissance, chroniclers have assumed that Fabiranum or Phabiranon on Ptolemy's Fourth Map of Europe (dating from AD 150) refers to Bremen. However, Ptolemy's coordinates actually suggest a site northeast of the mouth of the river Visurgis (Weser). In Ptolemy's time the Chauci lived in the area now called North-Western Germany or Lower Saxony. By the end of the 3rd century they had merged with the Saxons.

During the Saxon Wars (772–804), Widukind led a prolonged resistance to the western advance of the Franks. The Frankish king Charlemagne ultimately prevailed: thousands of Saxon nobles were massacred, and conversion to Christianity was ordered by decree. In 787 Willehad of Bremen became the first Bishop of Bremen. In 888, at the behest of Archbishop Rimbert, Kaiser Arnulf of Carinthia, the Carolingian King of East Francia, granted Bremen the rights (confirmed in 965) to hold its own markets, mint its own coins and devise its own customs laws.

The city's first stone walls were built in 1032, and the stone cathedral of St Peter's followed in 1042. These were marks of the wealth that was beginning to accumulate thanks to the North Sea trade. In the following century, Dutch settlers began to drain the surrounding wetlands and build the dikes that still characterise Bremen's surroundings.

In 1186 the Prince-Archbishop Hartwig of Uthlede and his bailiff in Bremen confirmed the Gelnhausen Privilege, by which Frederick I Barbarossa granted the city considerable legislative and fiscal autonomy. Property within the municipal boundaries was freed from feudal taxes, including serfs, who were considered free if they had lived in the city for at least one year and a day. The foundation for Bremen's later claim to its status as a Free Imperial City lay in this imperial privilege, which was confirmed and expanded by Archbishop Gerhard II in 1233, in return for assistance in the Stedinger Crusade.

The city's remaining tax obligations to the Prince-Archbishop were both a burden and a lever of influence. The city participated in the Diet or Landtag of the Archbishopric of Bremen, where as the main taxpayer it could obtain further concessions.

== Hanseatic League ==
In 1260 Bremen joined the Hanseatic League. A trade cartel of northern European towns, the league was centred in Lübeck, a base for merchants from Saxony and Westphalia trading in the eastern Baltic. This was a source of timber, wax, amber, resins, and furs, along with rye and wheat brought down on barges from the hinterland to port markets. Of equal importance to the powerful merchant guilds, or Hansa, of Bremen was the League's ability to control the North Sea salt-fish trade, and above all the Scania Market.

Bremen was engaged in numerous military actions taken by the League, all aimed at maintaining and enhancing collective privileges. In the 1440s the city also engaged privateers on its own initiative, in order to attack the League's rivals in the North Sea. One notorious captain, known as Grote Gherd ("Great Gerry"), managed to capture thirteen ships from Flanders in a single expedition.

Trade secured by the League brought both commerce and industry to Bremen and its surrounding region. Newer and finer woollen and linen fabrics, and even silks, were manufactured locally. The artisanal refinement of products from the textile industry could be found in other fields as well, such as etching, wood carving, armour production, engraving of metals, and wood-turning. Trade also increased exchanges with Italy and the Mediterranean, ensuring the early arrival of the Renaissance in northern Germany. A legacy from that period is the regional architectural style known as the Weser Renaissance, which characterises the embellished facade added to the Bremen Rathaus in 1612.

As for the League in general, much of the drive for the co-operation between otherwise rival cities derived from the fragmented nature of existing territorial governments, which had failed to provide security for trade. However, the League's importance declined in Bremen in the 16th century, as the United Dutch Provinces entered the competition and as greater princely authority consolidated, creating powerful monarchies such as Sweden, Denmark-Norway, Brandenburg-Prussia and England. The last of the League's great trading posts (or Kontors), in Bergen, closed in 1754.

== Struggle with the Prince-Archbishop ==
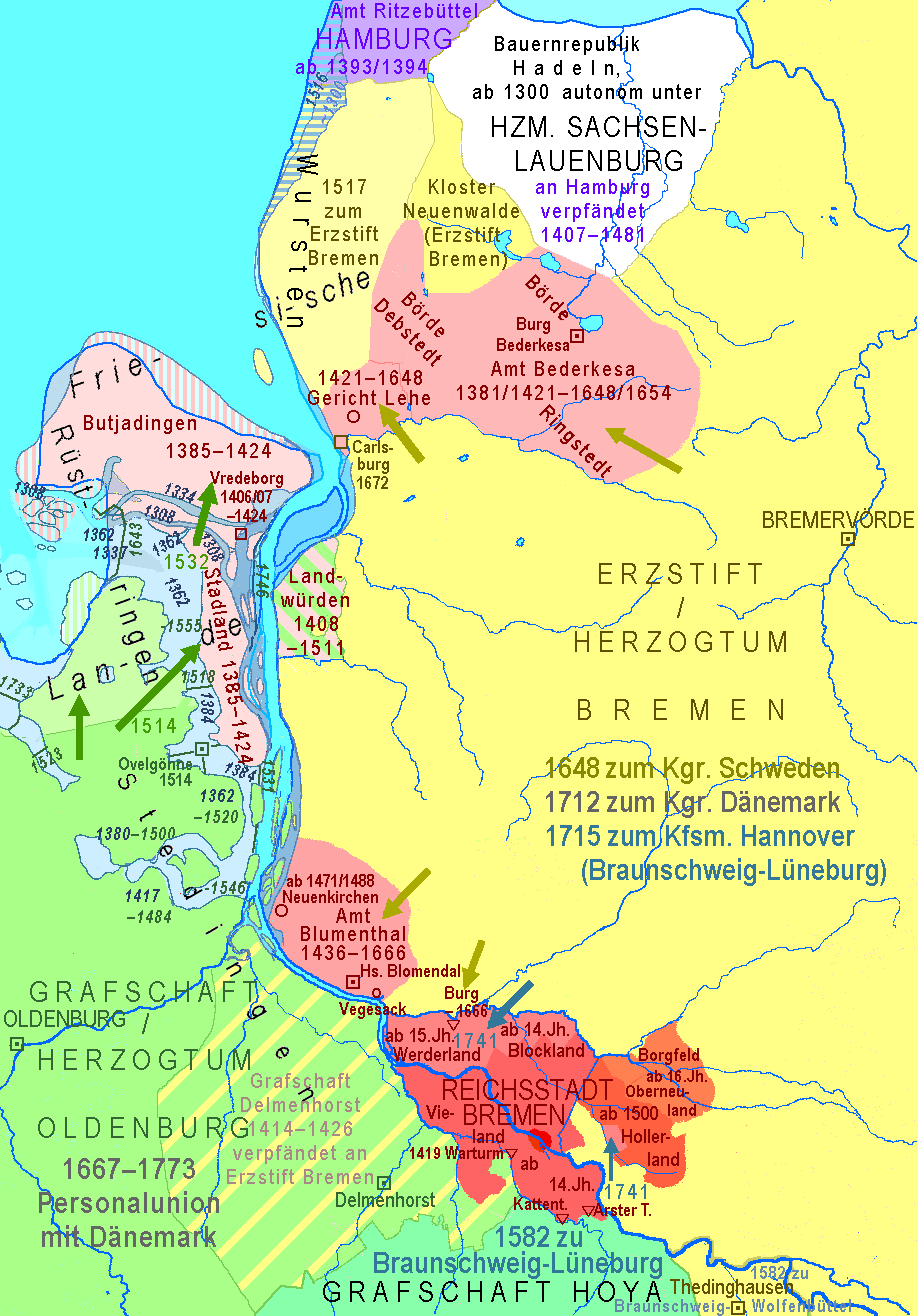
14th to 18th century: territories of the Free City of Bremen (red) and of the Archbishopric of Bremen (yellow); straits between lower Weser and Jadebusen

In 1350 Bremen was a city of 20,000, its trade flourishing thanks to the Hansekogge (cog ship), a unique product of its shipbuilders. Despite this, conflict with the Prince-Archbishop and other magnates in the surrounding country continued. In 1365, new taxes were levied to ransom burghers held hostage by Gerhard III, Count of Hoya, triggering a popular uprising in the city that was only put down by the city council after much bloodshed.

In response to the Prince Archbishop's attempts to exploit its internal struggles, the city further enhanced its fortifications. A particularly narrow gate, the so-called Bishop's Needle (Latin: Acus episcopi, first mentioned in 1274), was built and reserved for all clergymen, including the Prince-Archbishop himself. The narrowness of the gate was intentional, as it made it physically impossible for the bishop to enter the city surrounded by his knights. Despite these measures, factionalism permitted Prince-Archbishop Albert II of Brunswick-Wolfenbüttel to seize the city on the night of 29 May 1366. Still, within a month several exiles, with the assistance of the Count of Oldenburg, managed to recover the city and executed the collaborators.

By the end of the 1360s, Albert's growing indebtedness placed Bremen in a favourable position, as the city was able to effectively purchase not only his rights in the city, but also his many surrounding fortresses and bailiwicks.

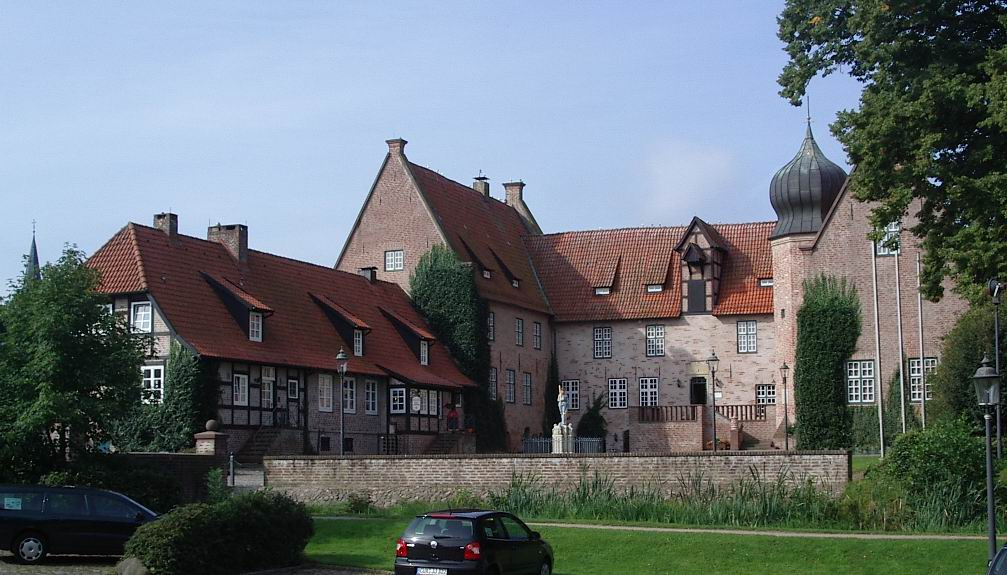
Bederkesa Castle, since 1381 a stronghold of Bremen within the Prince-Archbishopric

In 1381 the city's troops successfully ended the brigandage by other impecunious landed magnates and knights by itself becoming their liege lord, and thereby extending its control along the lower course of the Weser. As a measure of its new power and independence, in 1404 the city replaced its old wooden statue of Roland with a larger limestone model, which still stands today before the Rathaus in the central market place.

In 1421 Bremen reached its greatest extent, when the Duchy of Saxe-Lauenburg and the stricken Knights of Bederkesa pawned their lands on both sides of the lower Weser.

== Reformation ==
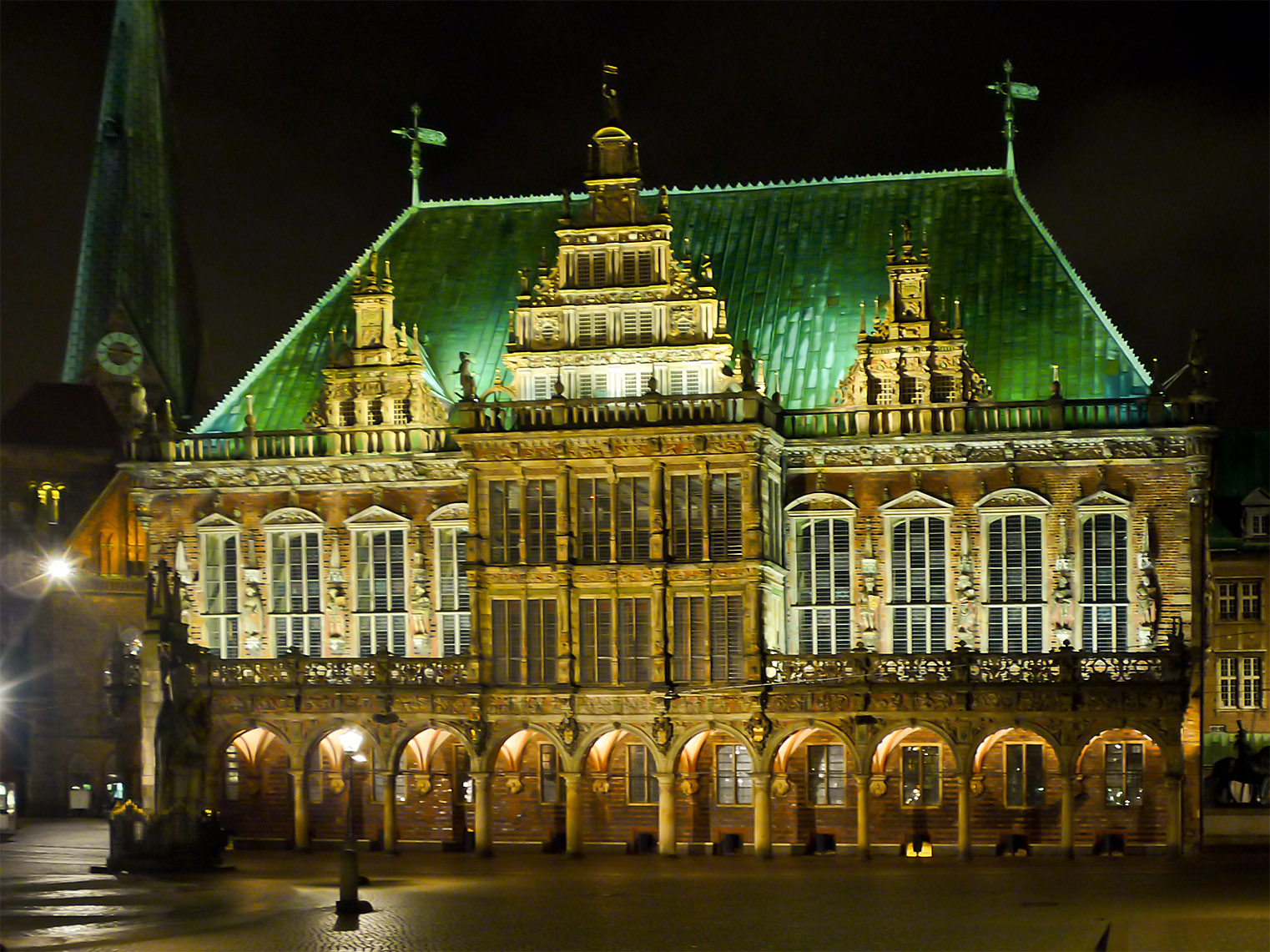
Bremen town hall

Bremen, long hostile to its Prince-Archbishop and the temporal power and pretensions of the Church, readily embraced the Protestant Reformation, as it swept across Northern Germany in the late 1520s. In 1532, Bremen's burghers forcefully interrupted Catholic Mass in St Peter's cathedral, the Bremer Dom, and prompted a pastor to hold a Lutheran service in its place. The Prince-Archbishop, who still retained sovereign control of the cathedral (one of his last rights within the city), shut its doors. Despite this, he was unable to stem the tide of conversion to the Reformed faith/Calvinism, even within the communities under his direct authority.

In 1547, the prevailingly Lutheran cathedral chapter appointed the Dutch Albert Hardenberg, called Rizaeus, as the cathedral's first Protestant pastor. Rizaeus, however, turned out to be of Zwinglian persuasion, which, after heated disputes, led to the cathedral closing its doors again in 1561, only to fully reopen them in 1638.

By the 1590s the majority of Bremen's burghers and city council had adopted Calvinism, in contrast with the cathedral chapter, which had remained Lutheran under the administration of the Prince-Archbishopric. This antagonism between a Calvinistic majority and the Lutheran minority that was to retain control of the cathedral until 1803 (when finally it was mediatised as part of the city), continued well into the 19th century. The conflict was conclusively resolved only in 1873, when the Calvinist and Lutheran congregations of Bremen reconciled under the administrative umbrella of the Bremen Protestant Church.

== Thirty Years' War ==
Soon after the beginning of the Thirty Years' War Bremen declared its neutrality. In 1623 it rejected the appeal of the Republic of the Seven United Netherlands to assist it in its struggle for independence against Habsburg Spain and imperial forces. Nonetheless, Imperial troops under Albrecht von Wallenstein and those of the Catholic League headed north. Wallenstein had visions of breaking-up the Hanseatic League, and of establishing new Baltic trade monopolies to benefit imperial favourites. In 1628, Bremen paid Wallenstein a hefty ransom to spare itself a siege, and by such means it was able to avoid occupation throughout the war.

In 1629 an imperial Edict of Restitution ordered Bremen to restore properties and rights within the city, including control of the cathedral, to a once again Catholic Prince-Archbishop. The city refused, stating it would rather separate from the Holy Roman Empire and join the Dutch in their Republic. The intervention of the Lutheran Swedes under Gustavus Adolphus saved the city from an imperial siege. However, once Swedish forces had gained control of the former episcopal territories around the city (an occupation that was confirmed by the Treaty Westphalia in 1648), Bremen sensed a new threat to its independence.

Bremen had appealed for an imperial confirmation of its imperial immediacy, which, it argued, had been implicit in the Gelnhausen Privilege of 1186. In 1646 Ferdinand III, Holy Roman Emperor, granted the request in the Diploma of Linz, recognising Bremen as a Free Imperial City.

== Swedish wars ==
Historical population
Year	Pop.	±% p.a.
1350	20,000	—
1810	35,800	+0.13%
1830	43,700	+1.00%
1850	55,100	+1.17%
1880	111,900	+2.39%
1900	161,200	+1.84%
1925	295,000	+2.45%
1969	607,185	+1.65%
1995	549,357	−0.38%
1998	550,000	+0.04%
2001	540,950	−0.55%
2005	545,983	+0.23%
2006	546,900	+0.17%
2009	547,685	+0.05%
2012	548,319	+0.04%
2014	548,547	+0.02%

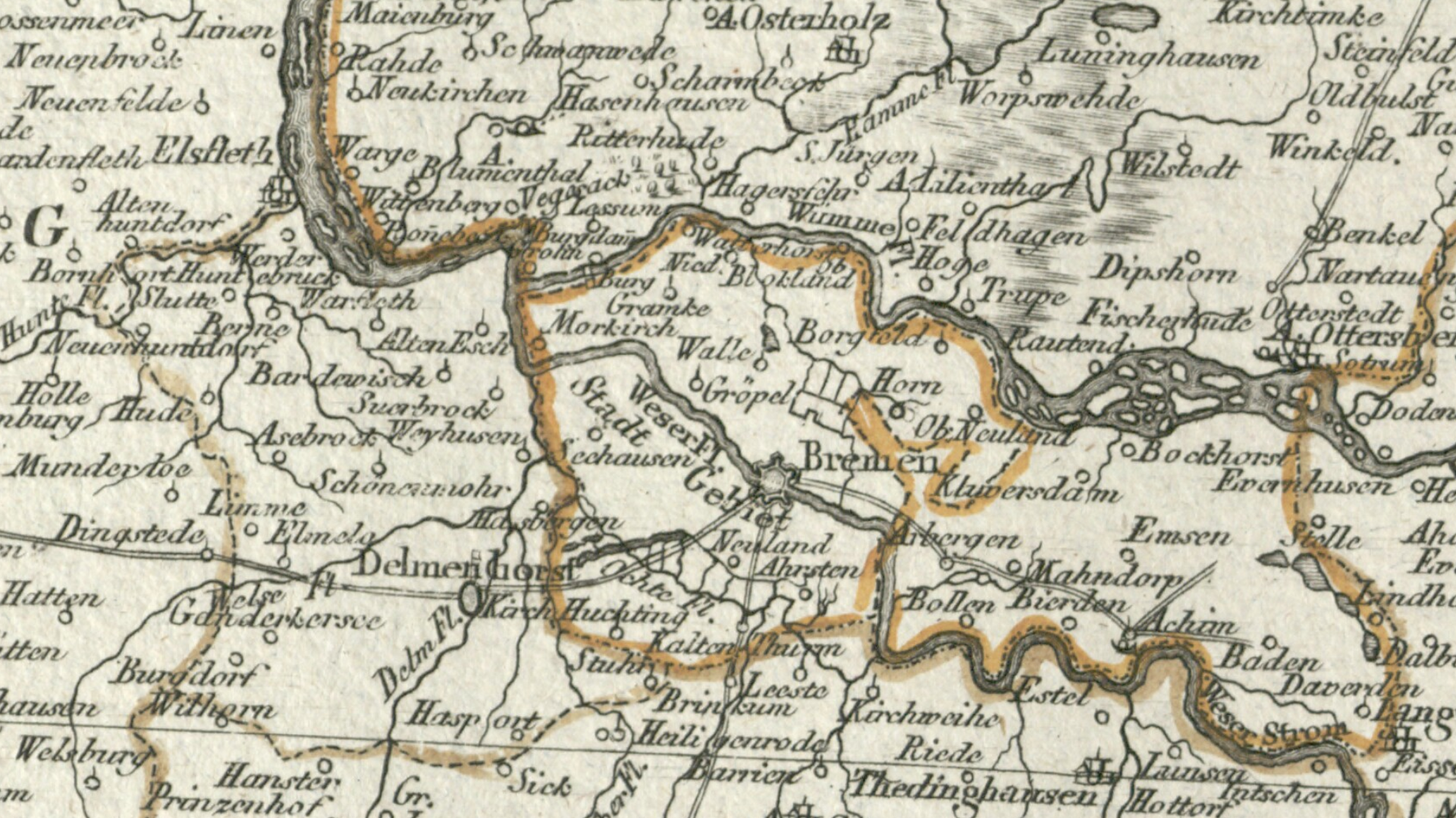
Territory of the Imperial City of Bremen on a late 18th century map

Sweden did not accept that its new imperial fief of Bremen-Verden did not include Bremen itself. In 1653 its troops captured Bremerlehe, prompting the city to once again appeal to Ferdinand III, Holy Roman Emperor. In February 1654 the emperor granted Bremen a seat and vote within the Imperial Diet for the first time, and demanded of Christina of Sweden that she return Bremerlehe and compensate the city. Despite such orders, further fighting ensued, and Bremen was eventually forced to pay tribute and levy taxes to Swedish Bremen-Verden, as well as cede territory around Bederkesa and Bremerlehe.

In 1664, after Bremen was again seated in an Imperial Diet, the Swedes, under Carl Gustaf Wrangel, laid siege. In response, a coalition of rival powers, including Brandenburg-Prussia, Denmark, and the Netherlands, was formed in defence of the city, leading to the Treaty of Habenhausen (1666) and to the end of any further Swedish attempt to seize the city.

In 1712, during the Great Northern War (1700–1721) against Swedish supremacy in the Baltic, plague stricken Bremen-Verden was occupied by Frederick IV of Denmark. In 1715 he ceded the territory to a new ally, George I, Elector of Hanover and King of Great Britain since 1714. Surrounded by Hanover, which remained in a personal union with Britain, Bremen was effectively sheltered from the subsequent wars of the eighteenth century. In 1720, George I recognized Bremen as a free city.

== 19th century ==
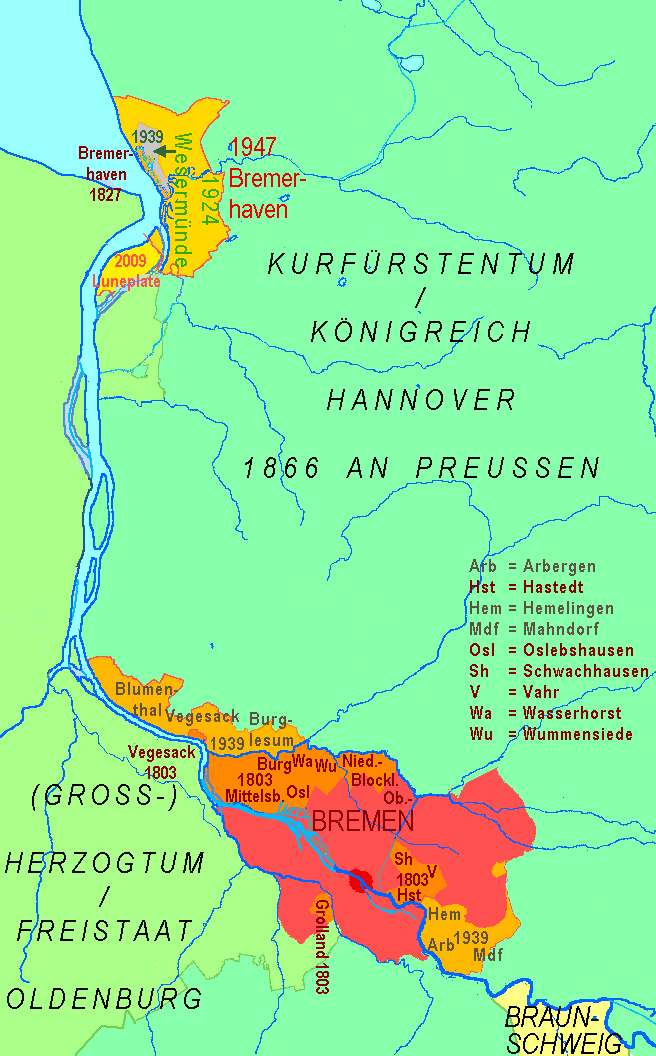
Territory of the Free City of Bremen since 1800

As part of his effort to enforce the Berlin Decree closing the European continent to British trade, Napoleon annexed Bremen in 1811, as capital of the Département de Bouches-du-Weser (Department of the Mouths of the Weser). In 1813, following their defeat at the Battle of Leipzig, the French withdrew. Johann Smidt, Bremen's representative at the Congress of Vienna, was successful in achieving the "non-mediatisation" of Bremen, Hamburg and Lübeck. Rather than being integrated into neighbouring monarchies, as many other small German territories, the three Hanseatic cities were restored to their ancient autonomy as republics within the new German Confederation (Deutscher Bund).

After Prussia defeated Austria in 1866 and annexed Hannover, Bremen joined Berlin in the North German Confederation. With the German victory over France in 1871, the Confederation was expanded under broadly the same Prussian-dominated constitution to form the German Empire.

Meanwhile, Bremen was developing as an industrial port. The first German steamship was manufactured in 1817 in the shipyard of Johann Lange. However, further development of the harbour, which was 37 kilometers upstream from the sea, was limited by the continuous silting of the Weser. In 1827, Bremen Mayor Smidt succeeded in purchasing a strip of land from the Kingdom of Hanover at the mouth of the Weser, establishing the harbour of Bremerhaven.

Together with rapidly growing railroad connections, the development of this new sea port made sure that Bremen retained its leadership over Hamburg as Germany's main port for migrants travelling to the Americas, not only from southern and eastern Germany, but also from Central and Eastern Europe from the 1880s onwards. It also allowed Bremen to serve as Germany's entrepôt for colonial trade, importing and processing coffee, tobacco, cotton and rice. This latter trade grew, as Germany began to acquire her own African and South Sea possessions after 1884.

Colonial expansion, and a parallel programme of naval construction, was strongly supported by merchant interests in Bremen, organised in the Kolonialverein (Colonial Union). Bremen's present status as "Germany's coffee capital" (with well-known brands and roasteries such as Jacobs, Azul or HAG) represents a legacy from that period. Another trace of this colonial past (though it was not completed until 1931) is the Reichskolonial-Ehrenmal, a ten-metre brick figure of an elephant, designed by Fritz Behn. For decades the monument stood as a symbol of German colonial ambition and nostalgia, but in recent years it has been repurposed as a "Bremen anti-colonial monument", with a memorial to the victims of the German genocide in present-day Namibia placed beside it.

The combination of mass Trans-Atlantic emigration and the colonial trade spurred the growth of major international shipping companies in Bremen. The greatest of these - now a part of Hapag-Lloyd- was Norddeutscher Lloyd (NDL), founded in 1857.

== 20th century ==
=== Weimar Republic ===
As an international port and industrial centre, Bremen had a strong liberal and leftist political tradition. In the last elections to the Imperial Reichstag in January 1912, the Social Democrats (SPD) secured over half of the votes at 53.4%, the Progressive People's Party took another 41.4% and 5.1% went to the conservative Christian-Social Party.

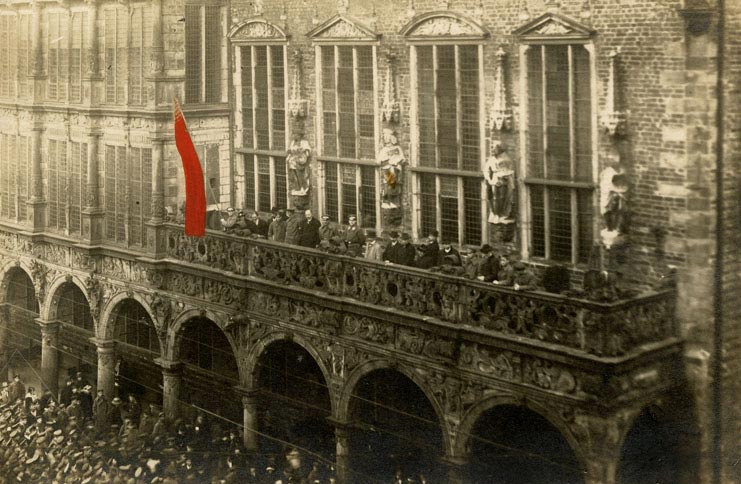
From the balcony of the Bremen City Hall, the shoemaker and Independent Social Democrat Adam Frasunkiewicz calls for the election of a workers' and soldiers' council, 6 November 1918.

In the final weeks of World War I, the German revolution broke out among sailors in Kiel and reached Bremen on 6 November 1918. A workers' and soldiers' council was formed which took over the city government eight days later. On 10 January 1919, the council, which was run by members of the radical left Independent Social Democratic Party (USPD) and the fledgling Communist Party (KPD), declared the establishment of the Bremen Soviet Republic. The Bürgerschaft (parliament) and Senate were abolished and a council of the people's deputies put in their place. Under pressure from banks, which feared a municipal bankruptcy, the council scheduled an election for a new Bürgerschaft on 9 March.

Before the election could take place, the socialist-led government in Berlin dispatched regular army troops and the Freikorps Division Gerstenberg to Bremen. It put down the Soviet Republic on 4 February with the loss of about 80 lives, established an interim government made up of members of the moderate Social Democratic Party (SPD) and imposed a state of siege. The 9 March election resulted in a government made up of the SPD, the liberal German Democratic Party (DDP) and centre-right German People's Party (DVP). A new republican constitution for the Free Hanseatic City of Bremen was adopted on 18 May 1920. It established a Bürgerschaft elected by universal suffrage that was responsible for legislation. The Bürgerschaft elected the Senate, which constituted the government of Bremen and chose two mayors from among its members. It was dependent on the confidence of the Bürgerschaft.

Bremen was governed by a coalition of the DDP and DVP from 1920 to 1928, at which point the SPD again joined the government. In the last free election to the Weimar-era Bürgerschaft in November 1930, the Nazi Party won 26.7% of the vote, coming in second behind the SPD, which took 31.0%. Two years later, in the November 1932 election to the national Reichstag, Bremen gave just 20.9% of its vote to the Nazis, compared to 33.1% nationwide.

=== Under the Hitler regime ===
After the Reichstag Fire Decree of 27 February 1933, the new Hitler regime began arresting or forcing into hiding members of the Communist Party and the Social Democratic Party. Violence broke out in Bremen on the day before the Reichstag election of 5 March 1933, and 40 persons were arrested. That same day, the Nazi Party Kreisleiter for Bremen, Otto Bernhard, called for a reorganization of the Senate and the dissolution of the Bürgerschaft. In that heavily compromised national election, the Nazis still achieved only 32.7% of the popular vote in Bremen, far below their 44% national average.

The following morning a large crowd led by Nazi brownshirts gathered in the market square, calling for the resignation of the Senate and hanging swastika flags on the facade of the city hall. The Police President refused to intervene, and hundreds of people gathered again in the afternoon. A Nazi delegation, led by Gauleiter Karl Röver and Kreisleiter Bernhard, entered the city hall and confronted the Senate with Nazi demands, including the transfer of the police administration in the hands of the Nazi Party. The Senate did not accept these demands, but agreed to hoist the former Imperial flag. As a result, the three Social Democratic members of the Senate resigned. However, since the Senate rejected the other demands, that evening the Reich Interior Minister Wilhelm Frick intervened and appointed Richard Markert as the Reichskommissar in charge of the Bremen police. Shortly afterwards, the remaining members of the Senate agreed that they would disband, effectively leaving Bremen under the control of the Nazis. After the formal resignation of the Senate, the Bürgerschaft elected Markert Senate President and acting Bürgermeister on 18 March.

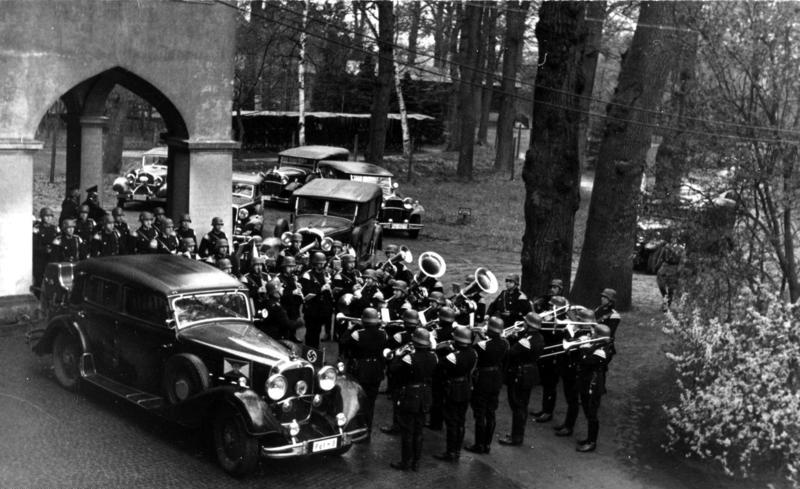
Schutzpolizei inspection, 1937

On 31 March 1933, the Nazi government enacted the Provisional Law on the Coordination of the States with the Reich, which mandated the reconstitution of the Bürgerschaft on the basis of the recent Reichstag election. When the Communist Party deputies were excluded in accordance with § 4 of the law, it gave the Nazis and their ally, the German National People's Party (DNVP), a majority in the Bürgerschaft. However, on 14 October 1933 it was dissolved, together with all other state parliaments, and no new elections were scheduled. On 30 January 1934, the Reichstag enacted the Law on the Reconstruction of the Reich, which mandated the assumption of state sovereignty by the Reich and the abolition of all state parliaments. Thus the Bremen Bürgerschaft, which had existed since 1849, was eliminated altogether. Bremen remained under the direct authority of Gauleiter Röver, who on 5 May 1933 had been appointed Reichsstatthalter (Reich Governor) for both Bremen and the Free State of Oldenburg, with his headquarters in Oldenburg. Bremen, though technically remaining a German state, effectively became only an administrative unit of the Reich.

1,438 people were registered as members of the Jewish community in Bremen at the beginning of 1933 (0.2% of the city's population). Of these, about 930 had managed to leave Germany by 1941. Those remaining suffered the same fate as those elsewhere in Germany: deportation and murder in the concentration camps of occupied Poland.

Bremen was the location of nine subcamps of the Neuengamme concentration camp, mostly for French, Polish, Soviet and Jewish men and Jewish women, including the Bremen-Farge concentration camp, established in the autumn of 1943, whose prisoners were used as slave labour at the U-boot Bunker Valentin.

In the war-plan economy of the new regime, Bremen was a centre not only of naval, and particularly submarine (U-boot), construction, but also of aircraft production. Henrich Focke, Georg Wulf and Werner Naumann had founded Focke-Wulf Flugzeugbau AG in Bremen in 1923 (the aviation company that, beginning in 1964, entered a series of mergers that incorporates it into today's Airbus). Borgward, an automobile manufacturer, was founded in 1929 (today part of Daimler AG) and it was also developed as a military contractor. War production employed foreign slave labour on an increasingly large scale.

The villages of Grohn, Schönebeck, Aumund, Hammersbeck, Fähr, Lobbendorf, Blumenthal, Farge and Rekum became part of the city of Bremen in 1939.

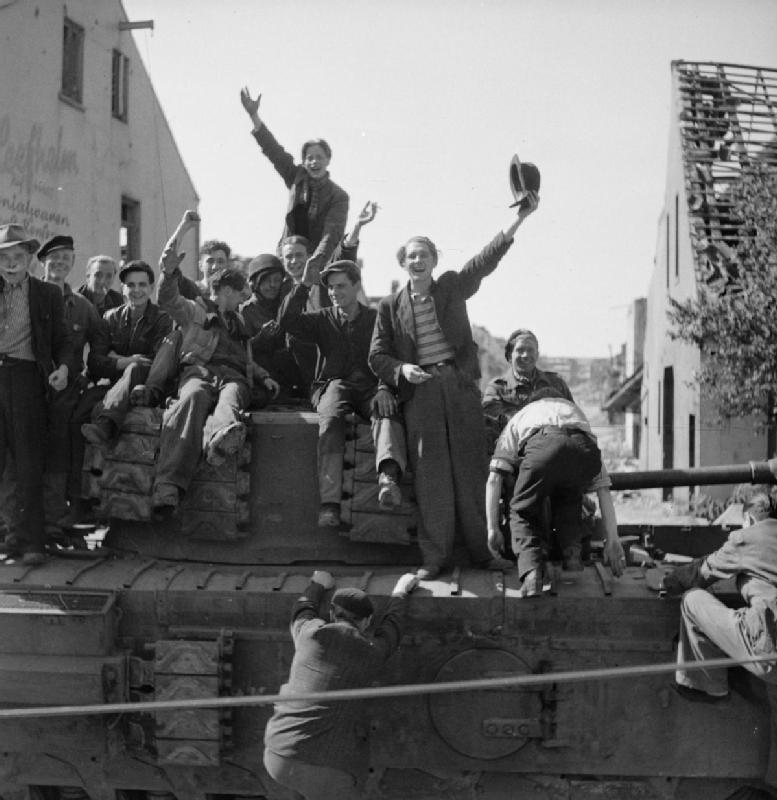
Liberated French and Dutch slave workers following the British capture of the city in 1945

Allied bombing destroyed the majority of the historical Hanseatic city, as well as 60% of its housing stock during World War II. The British 3rd Infantry Division under General Lashmer Whistler captured Bremen after heavy shelling in late April 1945. The British handed Bremen over to the Americans; the city became an American-controlled port for the supply of the US zones of occupation in west Berlin and the south of Germany.

=== Post-War reconstruction ===
On 1 August 1945, the US military government appointed Wilhelm Kaisen (SPD) (Senator for social services before 1933) mayor of Bremen, a position he continued to cover through several elections until his retirement in 1965. With the initial support of the Communists and the Liberals, Kaisen worked to re-establish the pre-Hitler democratic order. To prevent Bremen's incorporation into the recently formed state of Lower Saxony (within the then British zone of occupation), he successfully took the case for Bremen's traditional independence to the United States in 1946.

On 20 November 1945, a group of Polish DPs from Tirpitz Camp invaded a house where a family of 13 people were staying that night, including children and young adults. After the residents had handed over their food and their few valuable objects, they were taken to the basement and shot. 43 year-old Wilhelm Hamelmann was the sole survivor, attracted considerable attention by publicly forgiving the perpetrators and pleading for them to be pardoned, despite them killing his wife and children.

Bremen's signature Renaissance-fronted gothic Town Hall (Rathaus), the statue of Roland (1404) (symbol of the city's independence), and the 11th-century cathedral (Bremer Dom) survived Allied bombing. Limited efforts were made to restore other damaged structures of the old city, as priority was given to the construction of new much-needed housing, in light of the increase in population and arrival of many German refugees from eastern territories annexed by Poland and the Soviet Union. The restoration of industrial production and transport were also given priority in this initial reconstruction phase.

Between the 1950s and 60s Bremen's economy boomed, in line with the West German Wirtschaftswunder. This saw the growth, and permanent settlement of a large migrant worker population, drawn largely from Turkey and Southern Europe.

=== After the Wirtschaftswunder ===
Some of the city's heavier industries failed to recover from the oil-price-shock recession of the early 1970s and from the growth of industrial output in East Asia. Specialist construction yards, ship outfitters and parts suppliers remain, but AG Weser (which employed 16,000 workers at its peak) and Bremer Vulcan, Bremen's two major shipbuilders, closed in 1983 and 1997 respectively. Further job losses were caused by the restructuring and increasing mechanisation of harbour-related activities and other industrial sectors. Semi and unskilled harbour workers found it very difficult to re-enter the labour market, and unemployment—for a period in the 1980s almost double the West German average—remained comparatively high.

At a time when these changes in the economy were forcing the Senate to spend more on social services, suburbanisation was reducing Bremen's population and tax revenue. Incorporating surrounding suburban municipalities was not an option for Bremen, as these belonged to the state of Lower Saxony.

Following the 1991 elections, the SPD, while remaining the strongest political party, was obliged to form coalitions and therefore make political compromises. The first coalition was established with the smaller liberal Free Democratic Party (FDP) and the Green Party. It became clear to city leaders that the process of decline could only be slowed through public subsidies protecting less competitive industries, but not stopped or reversed. The idea of cutting subsidies and reorienting economic policy was particularly difficult for the Social Democrats, given their strong traditional links to manual workers and trade unions.

Eventually, and with offers of financial assistance from the European Union, a consensus developed on the need to support established economic sectors based on advanced technological developments, such as aerospace and aircraft production, automobile production, maritime and logistics services, and to develop education and business-park infrastructure for the emergence of new science-based and digital enterprises. In this the University of Bremen, founded in 1971, has been accorded a key role. It is one of 11 institutions classed as an "Elite university" in Germany, and teaches approximately 23,500 people from 126 countries. Further investment went into the revitalisation of the city centre but a culture-driven regeneration around entertainment and tourism was not very successful. Several experts described Bremen's service sector as underdeveloped, due to a lack of major company headquarters.

At the turn of the new century, unemployment In Bremen stood at 14%, a rate matched in the Federal Republic only by the "new states" in former East Germany.

=== The new immigrant city ===
As an international port and industrial centre, Bremen has always drawn people from abroad. In recent decades, the changing economy and international events have contributed to a rapidly changing population mix.

As of 2020, close of a third of the city population were of recent non-German origin. People of Turkish origin (first, second and third generation) remain the largest non-German ethnicity (there are 23,000 Turkish-born residents) but as a result of refugee resettlement since 2015 they are now closely followed by Syrians (18,000), and by people from central and eastern Europe, notably from Poland, Bulgaria and Romania.

=== Hegemony of the SPD ===
Save for 1918–22, when briefly they split, the Social Democrats have been the leading party in every free election in Bremen since 1912. They have formed, either singularly (1971–1991) or in coalition, every administration since 1945. Since 2007 they have governed with the Greens, a coalition joined in 2019 by the Left (die Linke), the SPD having won their lowest share of the popular vote, 24.9%, since the war. There was a recovery in the 2021 Federal elections, with Social Democrats in Bremen taking a third of the vote. In the 2023 state elections, the SPD won 28.9% of the vote; their coalition partners the Greens 11.9% and the Left 10.9%.

== See also ==
- Timeline of Bremen
