= Constitution of the Free Hanseatic City of Bremen =

The State Constitution of the Free Hanseatic City of Bremen is the constitution of the state of Bremen. It dates from October 21, 1947, and was last revised on August 15, 2019, with effect from August 16, 2019.

== Contents ==
The state constitution is shaped by the development of the constitutional debate in Bremen, by the constitution of 1920 and by the experiences from the time of Nazism. Therefore, the preamble states:

The constitution of the Free Hanseatic city of Bremen of October 21, 1947, was noticeably more reform-oriented than the southern German constitutions when it came to education and the school system. The constitution affirmed the right of all citizens to an education, allowed room for far-reaching changes in the traditional structure of the school system, and abolished Catholic and Protestant religion as a regular subject in school. In addition, a number of state educational goals were defined and parental rights were indirectly restricted.

It contains an extensive section on fundamental rights and duties (Articles 1 to 20 LV), which are largely similar to the fundamental rights of the Basic Law for the Federal Republic of Germany of 1949. In contrast to the Basic Law, the state constitution states, among other things:

- Article 8, 1st sentence: “Everyone has the moral duty to work and the right to work.”
- Article 14, 1st sentence: “Every resident […] has the right to adequate housing.”

The state constitution regulates the structure of the state with the separation of powers into legislative, executive and judicial branches.

- The legislative branch, i.e. the state parliament, is the Bremen Parliament. Referendums are permitted in accordance with Section 2 (Art. 69ff LV).
- The Senate of the Free Hanseatic City of Bremen is at the head of the executive branch. The members of the Senate, the Senators, correspond to the ministers in other federal states. The President of the Senate is also the Mayor of the Free Hanseatic City of Bremen and thus the highest representative of the state. His deputy also has the title of Mayor and Senator.
- The judiciary in constitutional disputes is handled by the State Court of the Free Hanseatic City of Bremen.

The executive and legislative bodies of the federal state of the Free Hanseatic City of Bremen are mostly also bodies of the city of Bremen. Legislation in the city of Bremen is the responsibility of the members of the Bremen citizenship (city citizenship), while the state's executive bodies also head the Bremen city administration.

The city of Bremerhaven has, as a local law, its own city constitution and its own municipal bodies according to the provisions of that constitution: the city council and the city magistrate.

The local law of the city of Bremerhaven of November 4, 1947 was approved by the Senate of the Free Hanseatic City of Bremen on November 14, 1947, and came into force on January 1, 1948. According to Article 146 (LV), the Bremen Senate has "supervision" of the "legality of the administration" of the municipality of Bremerhaven.

== Structure of the state constitution ==
The state constitution divides its 155 articles into the following main parts and sections:

- Basic rights and basic duties
- Order of social life
  - The family
  - Education and instruction
  - Work and economy
  - Churches and religious communities
  - Structure and tasks of the state
  - General
  - Referendum, state parliament (citizens) and state government (senate)
  - Legislation
  - Administration
  - Judiciary
  - Municipalities
  - Transitional and final provisions

== Changes to the state constitution since 1947 ==
Article 125 of the state constitution of 1947 stipulated that the constitution could only be amended by referendum or by a unanimous decision of the majority of the members of the Bremen Parliament present. This difficult hurdle prevented initially desirable amendments the constitution, with the exception of the amendments of 1953 and 1960. After the Basic Law of the Federal Republic of Germany came into force in 1949, basic rights were binding under federal law (Article 31 of the Basic Law: "Federal law overrides state law"); changes to the state constitution were therefore not necessary. It was not until 1994 that the unanimity rule of 1947 was changed by referendum to the effect that a two-thirds majority was sufficient for changes by the Bremen Parliament.

The constitution remained largely intact in its essential points. Amendments to the constitution were made on:

16 January 1953, 29 March 1960, 8 September 1970, 13 March 1973, 9 December 1986, 8 September 1987, 1 November 1994, 26 March 1996, 1 November 1996, 14 December 1997, 16 December 1997, 3 March 1998, 1 June 1999, 1 February 2000, 4 September 2001, 8 April 2003, 31 May 2005, 16 May 2006 and 12 September 2009.

The following changes are worth mentioning:

- In 1997, Article 2 was added, among other things, that "no one may be discriminated against because of their disability" and that disabled people are "under special protection by the state". In order to ensure equality between women and men, the state's obligation was included to "ensure equal participation of the sexes in the state and society", which "is to be ensured through effective measures". In addition, since then "efforts have to be made to ensure that women and men are equally represented in public bodies".
- In 2001, Article 2 also included a ban on discriminating against a person on the basis of their “sexual identity.”
- Since 1997, Article 11 has stated: “The State protects and promotes cultural life.”
- In 1986, Article 11a reinstated “responsibility for the natural foundations of life” and declared the protection of “soil, water and air” and the economical and careful use of “natural resources and energy” and “native animal and plant species” to be “priority tasks”. In 1997, Article 11b called for “species-appropriate husbandry” and “the avoidance of suffering” for animals. In addition, “education for a sense of responsibility for nature and the environment” was defined as a task in Article 26 in 1997.
- In 1997, data protection was also included in Article 12 and
- in Article 36a “the development and promotion of sport”.
- In 2010, Article 21 on marriage and family gave registered civil partnerships full equality with marriage within the meaning of the article, i.e. in their significance as the “foundation of community life” and in their “right to the protection and promotion of the state”. Bremen is thus the first federal state to enshrine the equality of so-called gay marriage in its constitution.
- In 2003, Article 25 strengthened the rights for the protection of children.
- Article 42 paragraph 4 stipulates that certain companies of the Free Hanseatic City of Bremen with importance for infrastructure may only be sold on the basis of a law. The newly inserted Article 70 Paragraph 2 opens up the possibility of a referendum on this law.
- In 1994, Articles 64 and 65 set out the commitment to the “growing together of Europe” and the “peaceful development of the world”.
- In 1994, the rights for referendums and citizens' petitions were redefined in Articles 69 to 74, 76 and 87. In 2009, the subject of the referendum was expanded and the hurdles for the decision were lowered.
- Articles 75 to 105 contain many changes to the election and citizenship practices since 1994. Equal opportunities for the work of the parliamentary opposition are mentioned here. The work and rights of the relevant committees or deputations as well as the investigative committees have been strengthened. While previously the tasks were carried out almost exclusively in the deputations (administrative committees), many tasks have been shifted to the parliamentary and non-parliamentary committees.
- In 2000, Articles 107, 110, 112, 114, 117 and 120 were added to provide provisions for State Councillors (e.g. as representatives to the Federal Government, etc.), who have since been able to serve as members of the Senate.
- The above-mentioned provisions on possibilities for amending the Constitution have been contained in Article 125 since 1970 and have been amended since 1994.
- In 1994, Articles 136 and 138 transferred powers from the State Court to the Federal Constitutional Court, and Article 139 specified that the President of the Higher Administrative Court (formerly: President of the highest court in Bremen) is a member of the State Court.

== Historical development ==
Since the Middle Ages, the basis of trade in the Hanseatic city of Bremen was initially the customary city law in conjunction with the Hamburg city law, then the statutes of 1433, subsequently amended by the New Concord of 1534 and finally the Kundige Rulle of 1756 (see for details under Bremen city law).

=== Constitutional debate of 1814 and 1830 ===
After the French Revolution, the liberal bourgeoisie in the German states also expressed a desire for their own constitution, based on the French model, with rules for the basic rights of citizens and for the separation of powers between the legislature, executive and court. In 1814, a special constitutional deputation drew up a draft. However, only a Senate election law was passed in 1816 and new regulations were issued for the Citizens' Convention. After the French July Revolution of 1830, a constitutional deputation was again commissioned. This discussion also failed to produce an agreement between the conservative Senate and the liberal bourgeoisie.

=== Constitution of 1849 ===
After the revolution of 1848/49, a constitutional discussion took place again. The liberal Citizens' Convention again appointed a deputation for this purpose. The constitution then drawn up came into force in 1849, in which many of the desired rights (basic rights, separation of powers, influence of the citizens as Bremen's parliament) were implemented. In 1850, corresponding municipal constitutions followed for Vegesack and Bremerhaven.

=== Constitution of 1854 ===
After the constitutional movement in the German states was crushed under Prussia's leadership, a restorative electoral law was introduced in 1852, according to which only men, citizens of Bremen, could vote, divided into eight classes: scholars, merchants, tradespeople, farmers and "other" citizens from Bremen, Bremerhaven, Vegesack and rural areas. The cost of acquiring citizenship was also high; many members of the lower classes were therefore not eligible to vote. By 1854, the citizens had drawn up a new constitution based on the liberal constitution of 1849. It lasted until the end of the First World War.

=== Constitution of 1920 ===
After the November Revolution of 1918, a Bremen Soviet Republic existed for a short time without a special constitution. In February 1919, the liberal bourgeoisie and the MSPD prevailed in a counter-revolution. A Bremen National Assembly was elected on March 9, 1919. This set up a constitutional committee in which Senator Theodor Spitta had great influence. The determined left with the USPD wanted a socialist free state with elements of a Soviet republic. The right was only in favor of limited parliamentarism. The majority of the Majority Socialists (MSPD) and the liberal, bourgeois parties (DDP, DVP) prevailed with a parliamentary constitution that came into force on May 18, 1920. This constitution was valid until 1933. The constitution was repealed during the Nazi era.

=== Verfassung von 1947 ===
After the Second World War, a municipally oriented constitution with many elements of the 1920 constitution was drawn up in 1946 on the basis of the specifications of the British occupying power and passed by the citizens. In 1947, the USA became the occupying power in Bremen. A new constitutional deputation - again under the significant influence of Senator and Mayor Spitta and with the help of Karl Carstens - discussed Spitta's draft constitution. The differences of opinion on the school system and co-determination in companies were eliminated. After the approval of all parties - except the communists - this state constitution was passed by the citizens on September 15, 1947, and adopted by referendum on October 12, 1947. It came into force the following day after its announcement on October 21.

== See also ==
- Bremen city law
- Constitutional Court of the Free Hanseatic City of Bremen
- State constitution
- History of Bremen (city)

== Literature ==
- Bengt Beutler: Die Verfassungsentwicklung in Bremen. In: Jahrbuch des öffentlichen Rechts der Gegenwart. Neue Folge / Bd. 52, 2004, S. 299–321.
- Volker Kröning, Günther Pottschmidt, Ulrich Preuß, Alfred Rinken (Hrsg.): Handbuch der Bremischen Verfassung. Baden-Baden 1991, ISBN 3-7890-2310-8.
- Heinzgeorg Neumann: Die Verfassung der Freien Hansestadt Bremen. Kommentar. Boorberg Verlag, Stuttgart, München, Hannover, Berlin, Weimar, Dresden 1996, ISBN 3-415-01842-3.
- Ingeborg Russ (Red.): 50 Jahre Landesverfassung der Freien Hansestadt Bremen. Mit Gesetz über das Verfahren beim Bürgerantrag und Verfassung für die Stadt Bremerhaven. Bremen 1998, ISBN 3-86108-625-5.
- Herbert Schwarzwälder: Das Große Bremen-Lexikon. Edition Temmen, Bremen 2003, ISBN 3-86108-693-X.
- Theodor Spitta: Kommentar zur Bremischen Verfassung, Schünemann-Verlag, Bremen, 1947/1960.
- Andreas Fischer-Lescano, Alfred Rinken u. a.: Verfassung der Freien Hansestadt Bremen. Handkommentar. Baden-Baden 2016.
- Andreas Rehder: Die Verfassung der Freien Hansestadt Bremen von 1920, Baden-Baden: Nomos, 2016, ISBN 978-3-8487-3274-6.
