= Sudanic languages =

Former classification of African languages

Westermann's 1911 Die Sudansprachen.

In early 20th century classification of African languages, Sudanic was a generic term for languages spoken in the Sahel belt, from Ethiopia in the east to Senegal in the west.

== Scope ==
The grouping was based on geographic and loose typological grounds. One of its proponents was the German linguist Carl Meinhof. Meinhof had been working on the Bantu languages, which have an elaborate noun-class system, and he labeled all languages not in Hamito-Semitic or Bushman that lacked such a noun-class system Sudansprachen. There were two main branches; Eastern Sudanic was largely equivalent to Nilo-Saharan sans Nilotic, and Western Sudanic to Niger–Congo other than Bantu.

== Background ==
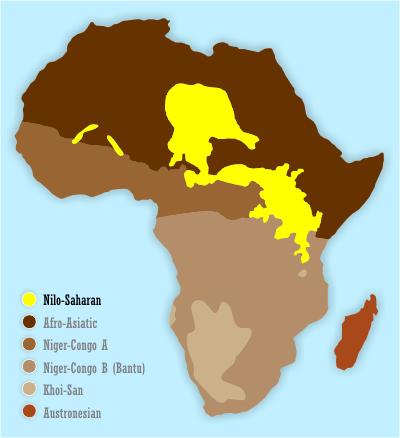
The Sudanic languages corresponded largely to Nilo-Saharan and Niger–Congo A on this map.

Westermann, pupil of Carl Meinhof, carried out comparative linguistic research on the then Sudanic languages during the first half of the twentieth century. In his 1911 study he established a basic division between 'East' and 'West' Sudanic, roughly comparable to today's distinction of Niger–Congo and Nilo-Saharan. His 1927 collaboration with Hermann Baumann was devoted to the historical reconstruction of the West Sudanic branch. He compared his results with Meinhof's Proto-Bantu reconstructions but did not state the obvious conclusion that they were related, perhaps out of respect for his teacher. French linguists like Delafosse and Homburger, not hindered by such concerns, were quite explicit about the unity of West Sudanic and Bantu, mainly on the basis of synchronic lexicostatistical data. In his 1935 "Character und Einteilung der Sudansprachen", Westermann conclusively established the relationship between Bantu and West Sudanic. This marked the beginning of the establishment of the Niger–Congo family, though it was not until 1963 that Greenberg's classification of African languages solidified and popularized the concept of Niger–Congo.

== Nilo-Saharan ==
Some comparative linguists including Christopher Ehret have used the term "Sudanic" specifically within the context of Nilo-Saharan to refer to a theoretical clade (monophyletic group) within the broader Nilo-Saharan phylum. According to Ehret, Sudanic is one of two primary branches of Nilo-Saharan, the other being Komuz (which he renames Koman). This classification is not accepted by other researchers.

== See also ==
- Congo–Saharan languages
- Eastern Sudanic languages
- Mande languages
- Nilo-Saharan languages
- Niger–Congo languages

== Notes and references ==
=== Notes ===
1. Homburger for example, in her 1929 comparative work Noms des parties du corps dans les langues Négro-Africaines, notes that 'some German Africanists (...) have proposed (...) a Bantu group, and a Sudanic group, and only lately have they come to recognize the unity of Bantu-Sudanic' [...quelques africanisants allemands (...) avaient posé (...) un groupe bantou et un groupe soundais, et ce n'est que tout dernièrement qu'ils ont reconnu l'unité bantou-soudanaise' (1929:1)

=== References ===
- Ehret, Christopher, 2001. A Historical–Comparative Reconstruction of Nilo-Saharan (Sprache und Geschichte in Afrika SUGIA, Beiheft 12). Cologne: Rüdiger Köppe Verlag. ISBN 3-89645-098-0
- Greenberg, Joseph H., 1963. The Languages of Africa (International Journal of American Linguistics 29.1). Bloomington, IN: Indiana University Press.
- Homburger, L. (1929) Noms des parties du corps dans les langues Négro-Africaines, Paris: Champion.
- Westermann, Diedrich Hermann (1911) Die Sudansprachen: eine sprachvergleichende Studie.
- Westermann, Diedrich Hermann & Baumann, Hermann (1927) Die westlichen Sudansprachen und ihre Beziehungen zu Bantu.
- Westermann, Diedrich Hermann (1935) 'Charakter und Einteilung der Sudansprachen', Africa, 8, pp. 129–148.
