= Baden, Lower Saxony =

Human settlement in Germany

Coordinates: 53°00′N 9°05′E

Baden
- Human settlement
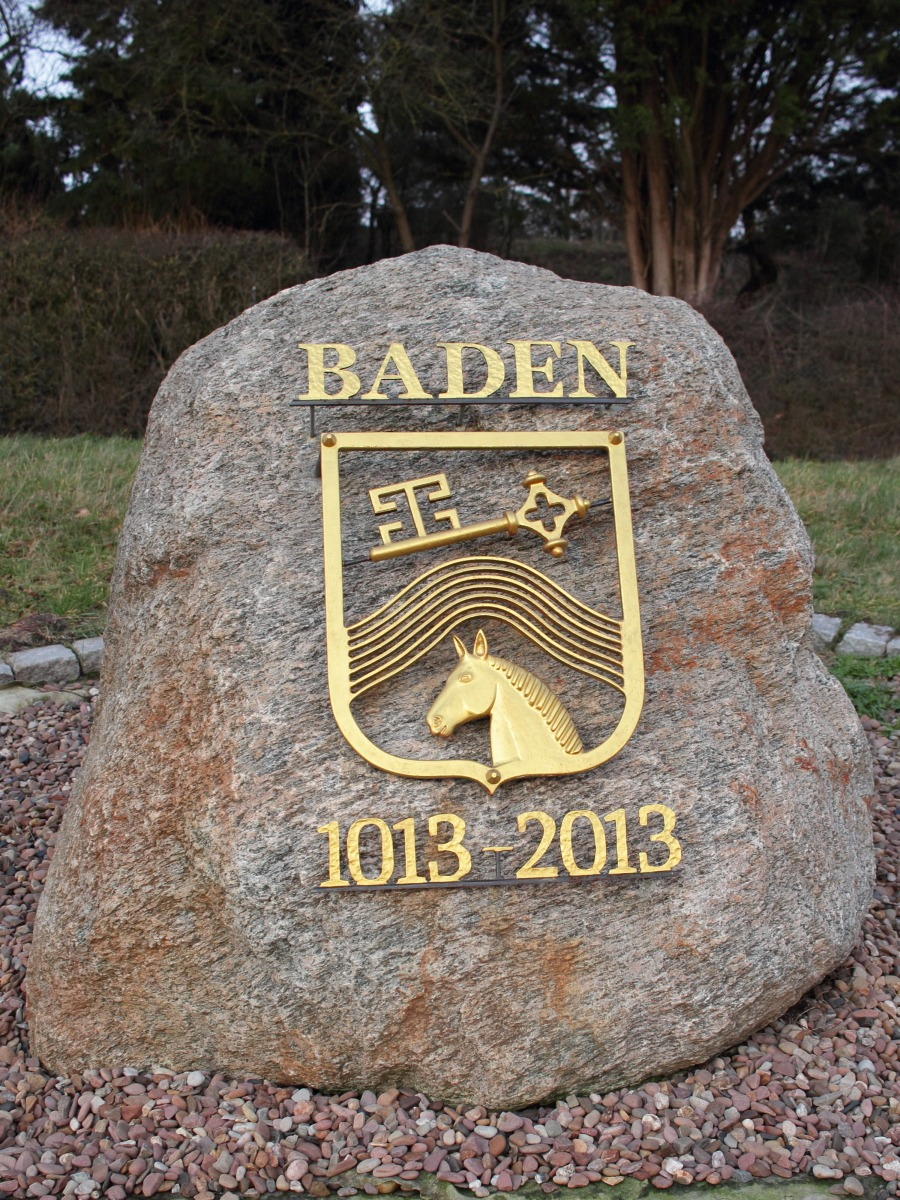

- Location of Baden in Germany
- Country: Germany
- State: Lower Saxony
- District: Verden (district)
- Borough: Achim
- Founded: 1013

Baden is a human settlement near Bremen, in Lower Saxony, Germany. It is known to Africanists and Phoneticians as the place where Diedrich Hermann Westermann was born and died. It is a borough of the town of Achim in Verden district.

Baden is on the train line from Hanover to Verden an der Aller to Bremen.

Baden's 1000th anniversary was celebrated in 2013.

== Badener Mountains ==
The Badener Mountains are located in Baden. The location is shaped by the Weser-Marsh to the west, and the collection of sand dunes of up to 40m high and the Badener-Moorland to the east. Until the 19th Century the area was only sparsely settled; the people lived by cultivating potatoes, breeding sheep, and working at the outlying factories in Bremen. Hans Höppner observed about 200 of the 250 types of bees in Germany in Badener Mountains from 1898 until 1900.

== Oil Camp ==
The Badener Oil Camp has been part of a bunker from World War I. It was erected in 1917 by Jürgen Daybridge. It served as a shipping station for raw oil, heating oil, and fuel. It was put into 14 subterranean containers; the last containers have been scrapped, however. During the Weimar Republic, the oil camp was rented to an oil company. As part of the re-militarization of Germany in preparation for the second World War, the oil camp was built up and extended (to 36 containers). Although the camp got through the war intact, it was blown up by English occupying troops in 1946. The Area remained in military use, and was made into a military practice ground for the German Federal Armed Forces in 1956, housing the Steuben-Kaserne/ Steuben-barracks, named after Friedrich Wilhelm von Steuben as well as the local practice area. It used to be home to the 11th Flugabwehrregiment (AAA-Regiment 11) until the area was disbanded completely in 2003.
