= Diedrich Hermann Westermann =

German missionary and linguist (1875–1956)

Westermann's 1911 Die Sudansprachen.

Diedrich Hermann Westermann (24 June 1875 – 31 May 1956) was a German missionary, Africanist, and linguist. He substantially extended and revised the work of Carl Meinhof, his teacher, although he rejected some of Meinhof's theories only implicitly. Westermann is seen as one of the founders of modern African linguistics.

He carried out extensive linguistic and anthropological research in the area ranging from Senegal eastwards to the Upper Nile. His linguistic publications cover a wide range of African languages, including the Gbe languages, Nuer, Kpelle, Shilluk, Hausa, and Guang.

Westermann's comparative work, begun in 1911, initially brought together much of today's Niger–Congo and Nilo-Saharan language phyla under the name Sudanic languages. His most important later publication Die westlichen Sudansprachen 1927a divided these into East and West Sudanic languages and laid the basis for what would become Niger–Congo. In this book and a series of associated articles between 1925 and 1928, Westermann both identified a large number of roots that form the basis of our understanding of Niger–Congo and set out the evidence for the coherence of many of the families that constitute it. Much of the classification of African languages associated with Joseph Greenberg actually derives from the work of Westermann.

In 1927 Westermann published a Practical Orthography of African Languages, which became later known as the Westermann script. Subsequently, he published the influential and oft-reprinted Practical Phonetics for Students of African Languages in collaboration with Ida C. Ward (1933).

He was born in Baden near Bremen and also died there.

== Bibliography ==
- Westermann, Diedrich H. (1911) Die Sudansprachen [The Sudanic languages].
- Westermann, Diedrich H. (1912) The Shilluk People. Berlin.
- Westermann, Diedrich H. (1925) Das Tschi und Guang. Ihre Stellung innerhalb der Ewe-Tschi Gruppe. MSOS, 28:1-85.
- Westermann, Diedrich H. (1926a) Das Ibo in Nigerien. Seine Stellung innerhalb der Kwa-Sprachen. MSOS, 29:32-60.
- Westermann, Diedrich H. (1926b) Das Edo in Nigerien. Seine Stellung innerhalb der Kwa-Sprachen. MSOS, 29:1-31.
- Westermann, Diedrich H. (1927a) 'Die westlichen Sudansprachen und ihre Beziehungen zum Bantu' Berlin: de Gruyter.
- Westermann, Diedrich H. (1927b) Das Nupe in Nigerien. Seine Stellung innerhalb der Kwa-Sprachen. MSOS, 30:173-207.
- Westermann, Diedrich H. (1928) Die westatlantische Gruppe der Sudansprachen. MSOS, 31:63-86.
- Westermann, Diedrich Hermann & Ward, Ida C. (1933) Practical phonetics for students of African languages. London: Oxford University Press for the International African Institute.
- Westermann, Diedrich H. (1940) Africans recount their lives. Eleven self-portraits (Afrikaner erzählen ihr Leben. Elf Selbstdarstellungen), Essener Verlagsanstalt
- Westermann, Diedrich H. (1948). The missionary and anthropological research. Oxford University Press for the International African Institute.
- Westermann, Diedrich H. (1949). Sprachbeziehungen und Sprachverwandtschaft in Afrika. Sitzungsberichte der Deutschen Akademie der Wissenschaften zu Berlin, Philosophisch-Historische Klasse, 1948 (Nr. 1). Berlin: Akademie-Verlag.
- Westermann, Diedrich H. (1952). The languages of West Africa. Oxford: Oxford University Press.
- Westermann, Diedrich H. (1964). Practical phonetics for students of African languages (4th improvement). Oxford: Oxford University Press.
