= Farge =

- Ortsteil of Bremen
- Interactive map of Farge
- Location within Germany Location within Bremen
- Coordinates: 53°12′0″N 08°32′0″E
- Country: Germany
- State: Bremen
- City: Bremen

Area
  - Total: 5.46 km^{2} (2.11 sq mi)

Population (2020-12-31)
  - Total: 2,851
  - Density: 522/km^{2} (1,350/sq mi)
- Time zone: UTC+01:00 (CET)
  - Summer (DST): UTC+02:00 (CEST)
- Vehicle registration: HB

Farge (German pronunciation: [ˈfaʁɡə]) is a small village in the borough Blumenthal of Bremen, Germany. It is located at the river Weser.

The bombing of Bremen in World War II attacked Farge targets, including the oil storage.

The Farge concentration camp is located nearby in the village Schwanewede in Lower Saxony.
