= Hans Höppner =

German botanist

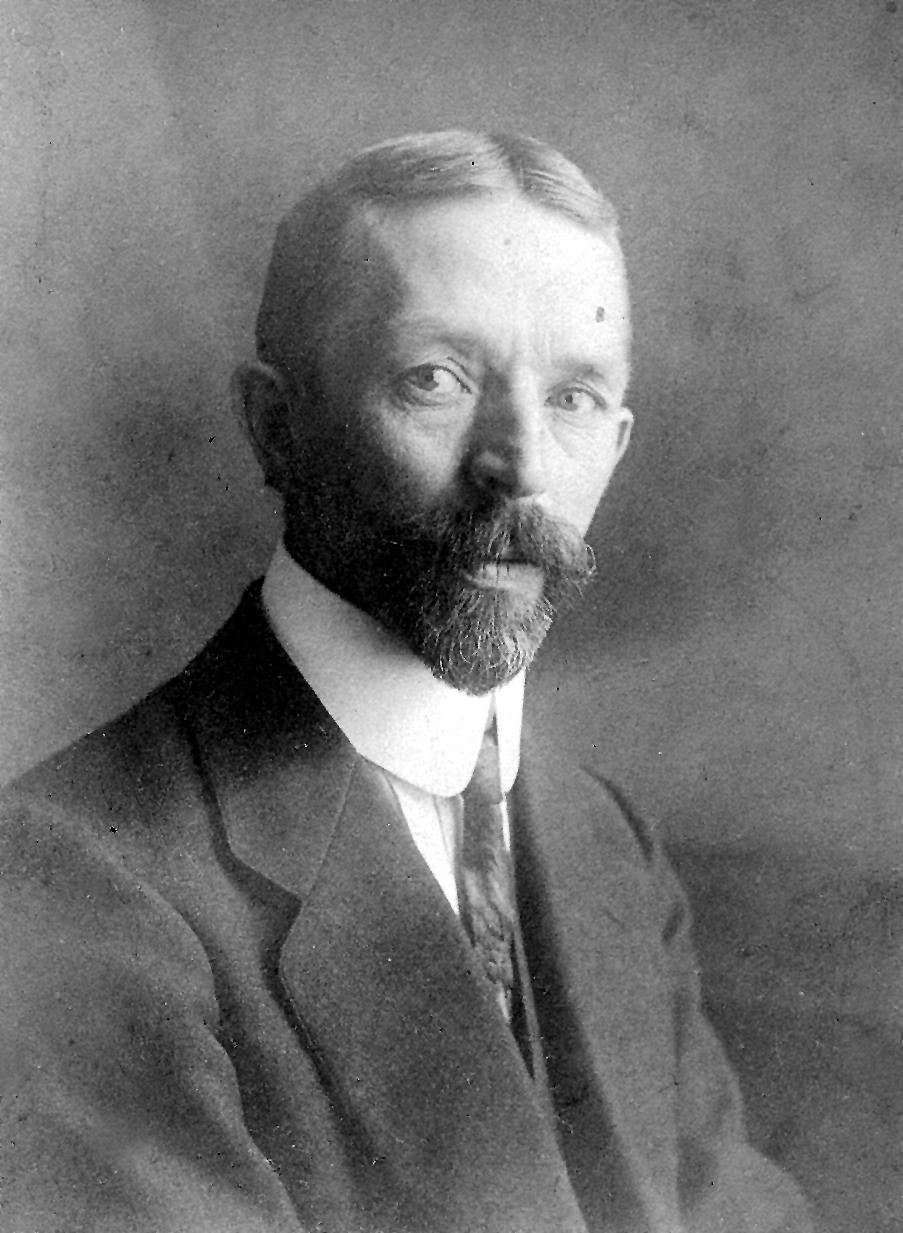
Hans Höppner (1873-1946)

Hans Höppner (8 February 1873, in Bremen – 24 April 1946, in Krefeld) was a German botanist and entomologist.

He worked as a secondary school teacher in the city of Krefeld. Here, he oversaw the local natural science museum, its herbarium and also worked on the museum's entomological collections. Höppner issued the exsiccata Orchidaceae exsiccatae. Mitteleuropäische Orchideen (1917–1932).

Known for investigations of flora native to the Lower Rhine, he also made numerous taxonomic contributions within the botanical family Orchidaceae. In the field of entomology, he published a regional study on bees called Die Bienenfauna der Dünen und Weserabhänge zwischen Uesen und Baden (1901).

== Principal works ==
- Flora des Niederrheins : zum gebrauch in schulen und afu ausflügen, 1907 - Flora of the Lower Rhine.
- Flora des Westfälisch-Rheinischen Industriegebietes unter Einschluß der Rheinischen Bucht, 1926 - Flora of the Rhenish-Westphalian industrial area, including the Rhine basin.
