= Farge concentration camp =

KZ Farge
- Concentration camp
- Location: Schwanewede in Lower Saxony, Germany
- Operated by: Schutzstaffel
- Operational: 1 July 1943 to 10 April 1945

Bremen-Farge concentration camp Farge was subcamp number 179 of the Neuengamme concentration camp complex. It was established in the autumn of 1943. When established, it was the second largest Neuengamme satellite camp, although the only known prisoner count is 2092, recorded in March 1945. The prisoners were used as slave labour at the U-boot Bunker Valentin.

The camp was sited at a large, naval–fuel–oil, storage facility; some prisoners were accommodated in an empty, giant, underground, fuel tank. The camp was commanded by an army captain, Ulrich Wahl, and the prisoners were guarded by a detachment of naval infantry. Only a handful of SS men were involved in the running of the camp.

The prisoners included German political prisoners, as well as Russian, Polish, French and Greek prisoners of war. Work on the Valentin bunker took place around the clock, with workers forced to work 12–hour shifts. The heavy work resulted in a high death rate amongst prisoners. However, only the deaths of 553 French prisoners have been confirmed. The total number of deaths may be as high as 6000 as the names of the Polish and Russian dead were not recorded.

The evacuation began on 10 April 1945 and survivors included Raymond Portefaix and Harry Callan.
