= Viertel (Bremen) =

Neighborhood of Bremen, Germany

Coordinates: 53°04′22″N 8°49′23″E

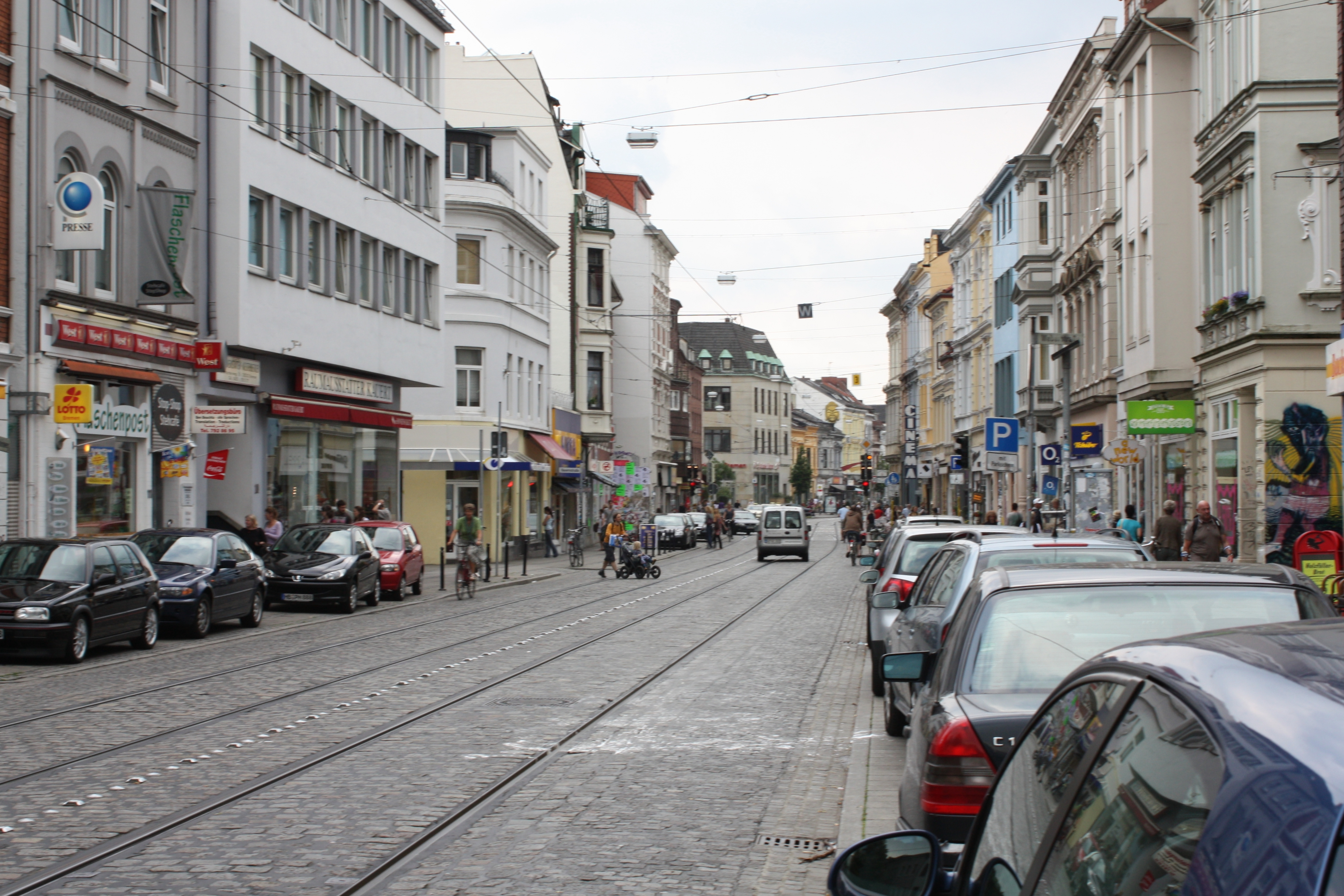
Ostertorsteinweg in the Viertel

Viertel (literally "quarter") is a centrally located neighborhood in the city of Bremen, Germany. It lies east of the old town on the border between two different administrative subdistricts: Ostertor and Steintor. It is currently recognised for its many cafés, restaurants, and boutiques.

== History ==
The neighborhood was developed between the mid-19th century and the 1930s. During this time period, typical Bremen Houses (Bremer Häuser) were built in a combination of Neohistoricist, Neoclassical and Art Nouveau styles. Despite the diversity of styles, the architecture nevertheless creates an attractive, harmonious environment. Construction firms designed whole stretches of the streets, interspersing tall, narrow row houses with stately villas.

In the mid-20th century, the area around Ostertor fell into a sorry state because there were plans to build an expressway along the Mozartstraße, one of the principal streets in Viertel. After prolonged protests, the plans were eventually abandoned in 1973. With the threat of demolition no longer looming, the old facades were restored, making the district one of Bremen's most presentable and lively neighborhoods. New buildings are now designed so that they match the local color scheme and fit into their historic surroundings.

== Landmarks ==
The Viertel embraces Bremen's cultural mile with the city's main theatre, and three museums. The Theater am Goetheplatz, completed in 1913 in the Neoclassical style, presents productions of musicals, opera and drama as the main venue of Theater Bremen. The art museum Kunsthalle Bremen was built in 1849, enlarged in 1902 and further expanded in 2011. It houses European paintings and sculptures from the Middle Ages to the present day as well as a new media section. The Gerhard Marcks House from 1825 is a museum inspired by the sculptor Gerhard Marcks exhibiting contemporary sculpture. Forming a pair with the Wilhelm Wagenfeld House standing opposite, it hosts design exhibitions inspired by Wilhelm Wagenfeld, noted for his household object designs.

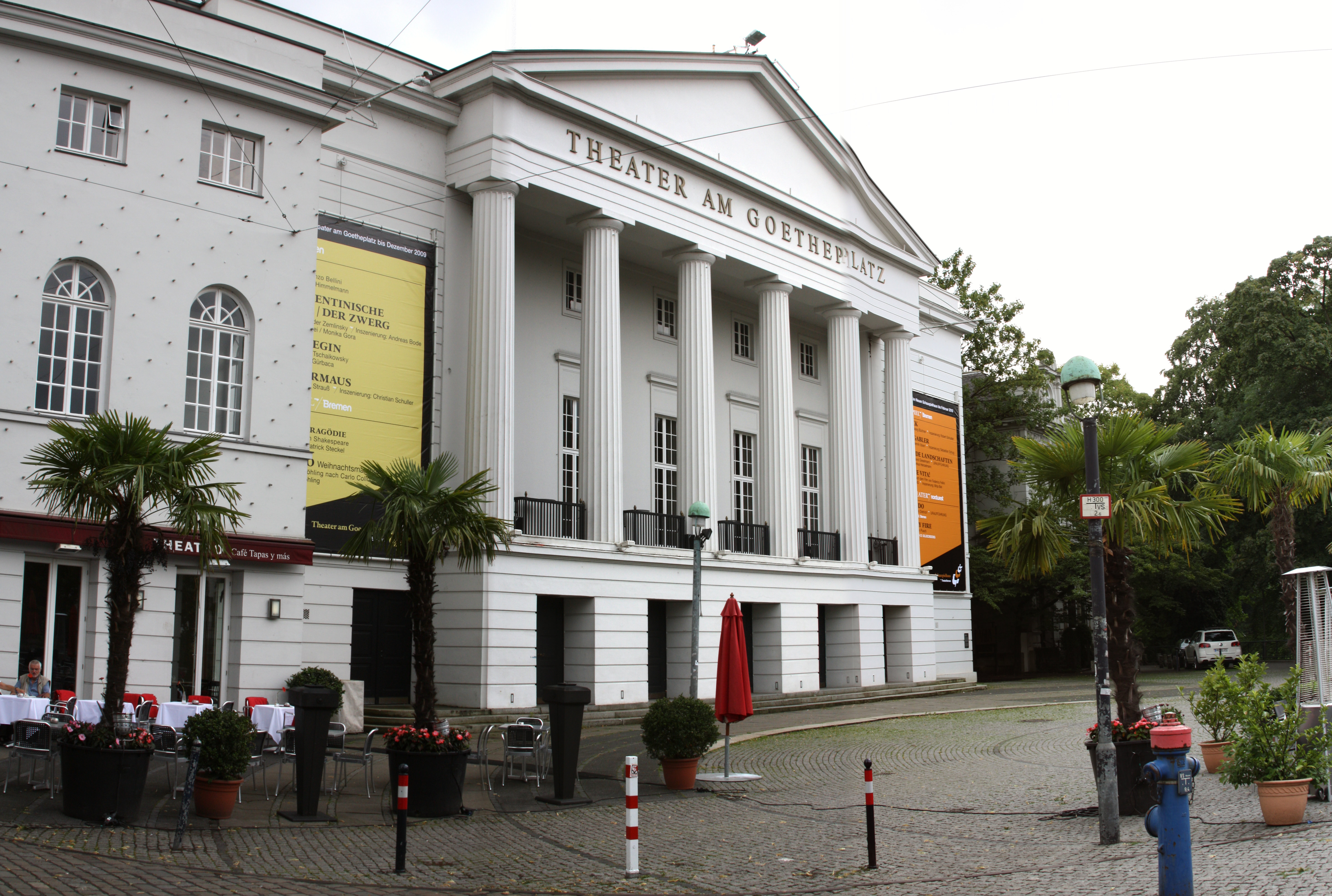
Theater am Goetheplatz

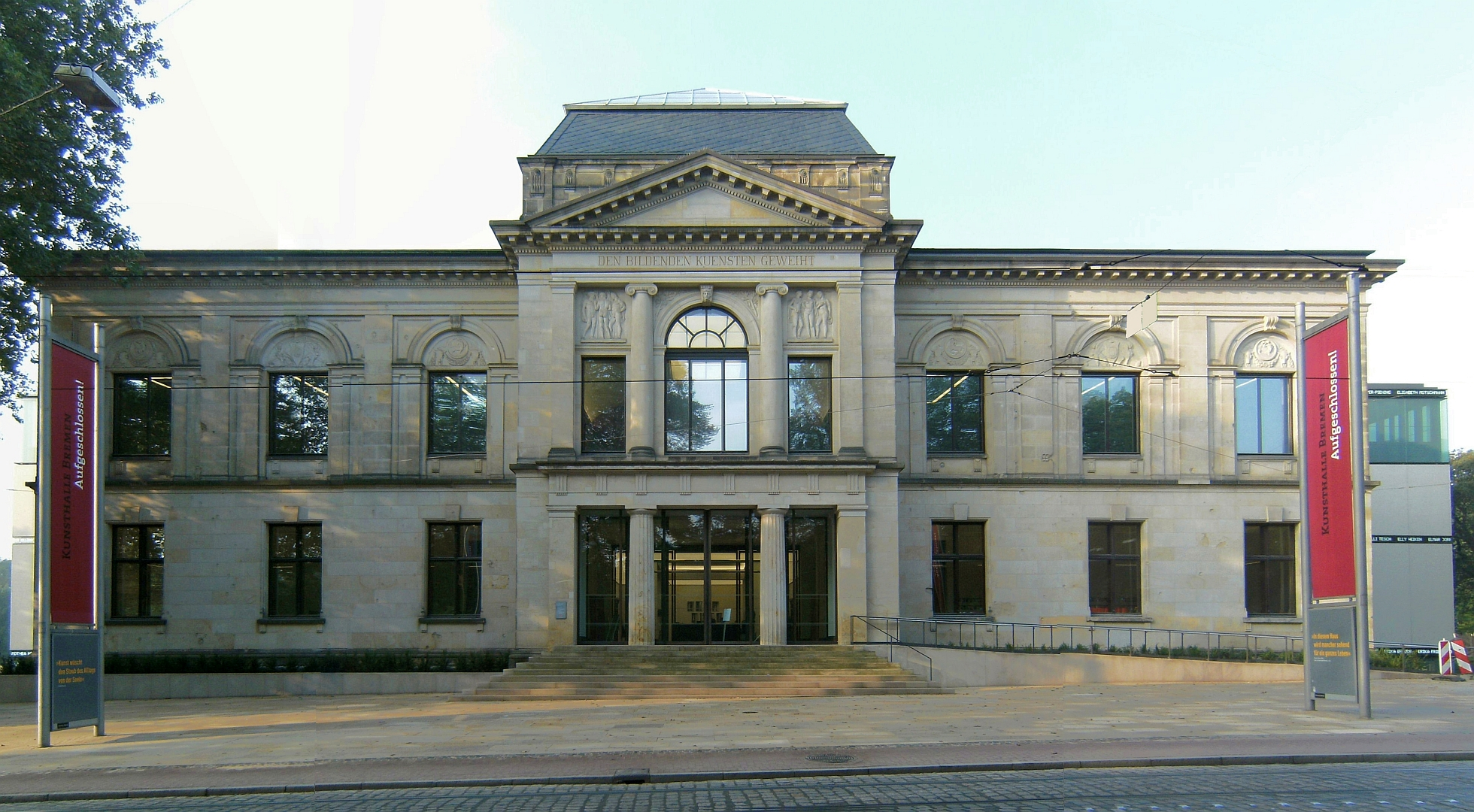
Kunsthalle Bremen

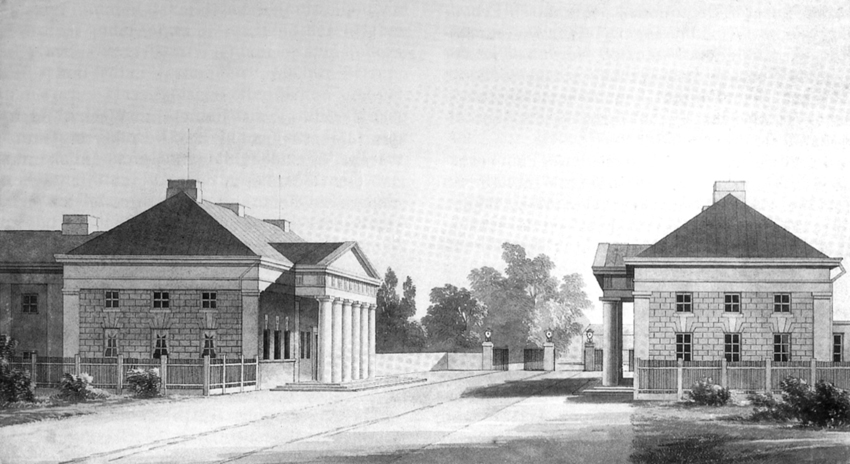
The Gerhard Marcks House paired with the Wilhelm Wagenfeld House

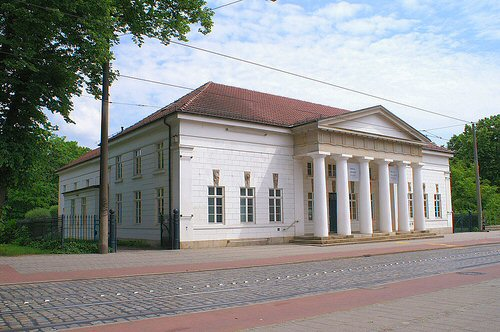
Wilhelm Wagenfeld House

Another interesting landmark in the area is "Wilhelm Holtorf Kolonialwaren von 1874", an old grocer's shop on Ostertorsteinweg which was renovated in the Art Nouveau style in 1903 and is now a listed building.

== The Viertel district today ==
Today the district is known for its shops, cafés and restaurants. In addition to the cultural mile, locals also appreciate the shopping mile on Ostertorsteinweg stretching from the theatre to St. Jürgen Straße. There are no department stores here, only small shops and boutiques offering everything imaginable.
