= Theater Bremen =

State theatre

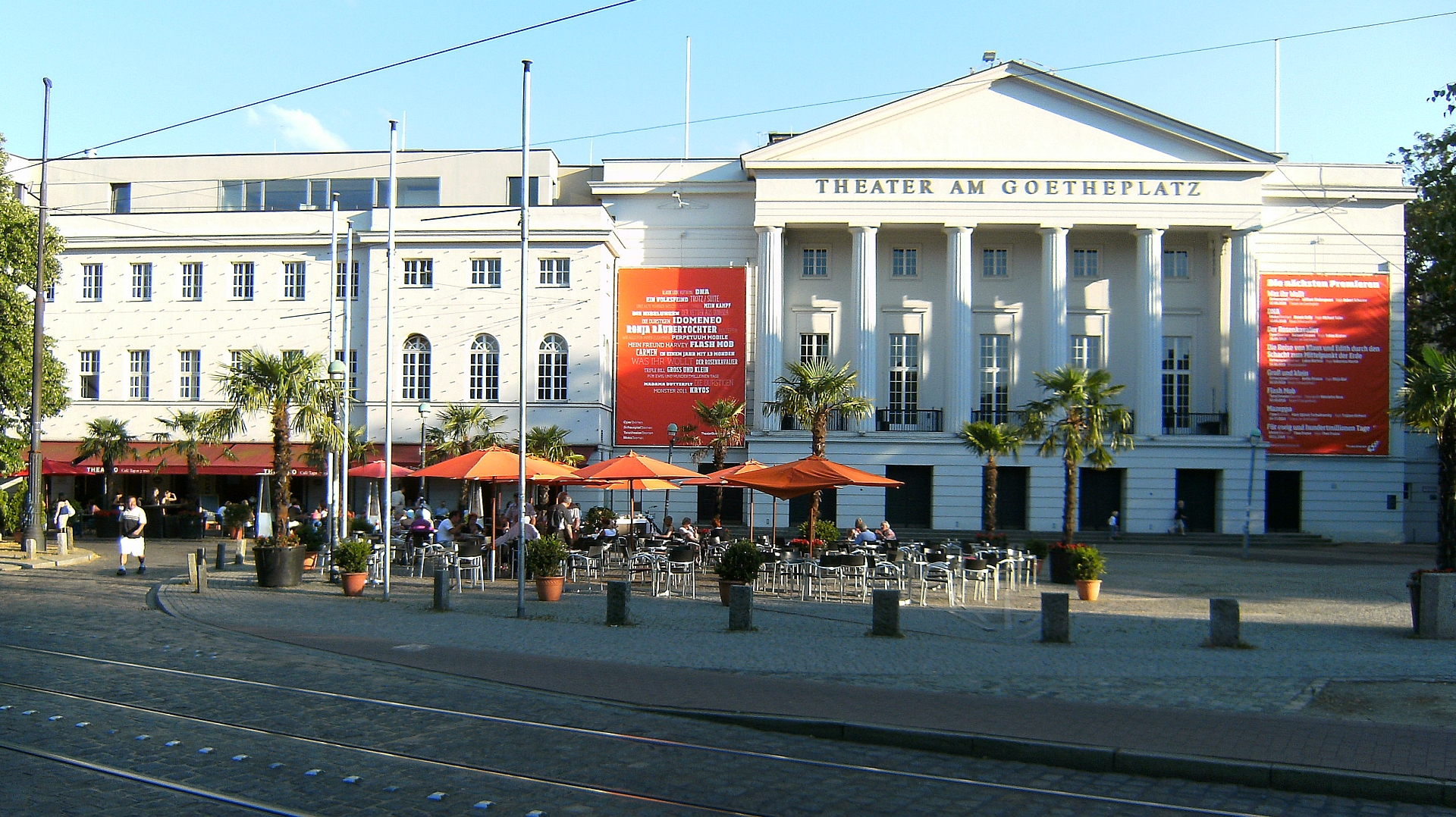
- Theater am Goetheplatz, the theatre's main venue
- Interactive map of Theater Bremen
- Address: Bremen; Germany
- Coordinates: 53°04′18″N 8°48′58″E

Construction
- Opened: 1913
- Reopened: 1950

Website
- www.theaterbremen.de

Theater Bremen (Bremen Theatre) is a state theatre in Bremen, Germany, with four divisions for opera, straight theater, dance, and student programs. Its venues are located in a city block, connected in architecture and seating up to 1,426 spectators. The theatre has drawn international attention since 1962 with innovative play productions in the Bremer Stil (Bremen style). Its opera company was selected as opera house of the year by Opernwelt in 2007.

== Organization ==
Theater Bremen is a company with four divisions: the Oper Bremen (Bremen opera), the Schauspiel Bremen (Bremen Playhouse), the Tanztheater Bremen (Bremen Dance Theatre) and the MoKS Bremen, short for Modellversuch Künstler und Schüler (Experimental Modal: Artists and Schoolgoers). The four venues seat up to 1,426 spectators. The musical divisions have collaborated since 1917 with the Bremer Philharmoniker, an orchestra founded in 1820. The theatre has drawn international attention since 1962, when Kurt Hübner staged innovative productions known as the Bremer Stil (Bremen style). Several stage directors and actors shaped the period, and many became well known, such as directors Peter Stein, Peter Zadek, Rainer Werner Fassbinder, Hans Neuenfels and Johannes Schaaf, and actors Edith Clever, Jutta Lampe, Margit Carstensen, Bruno Ganz, and Rolf Becker.

== Location and venues ==
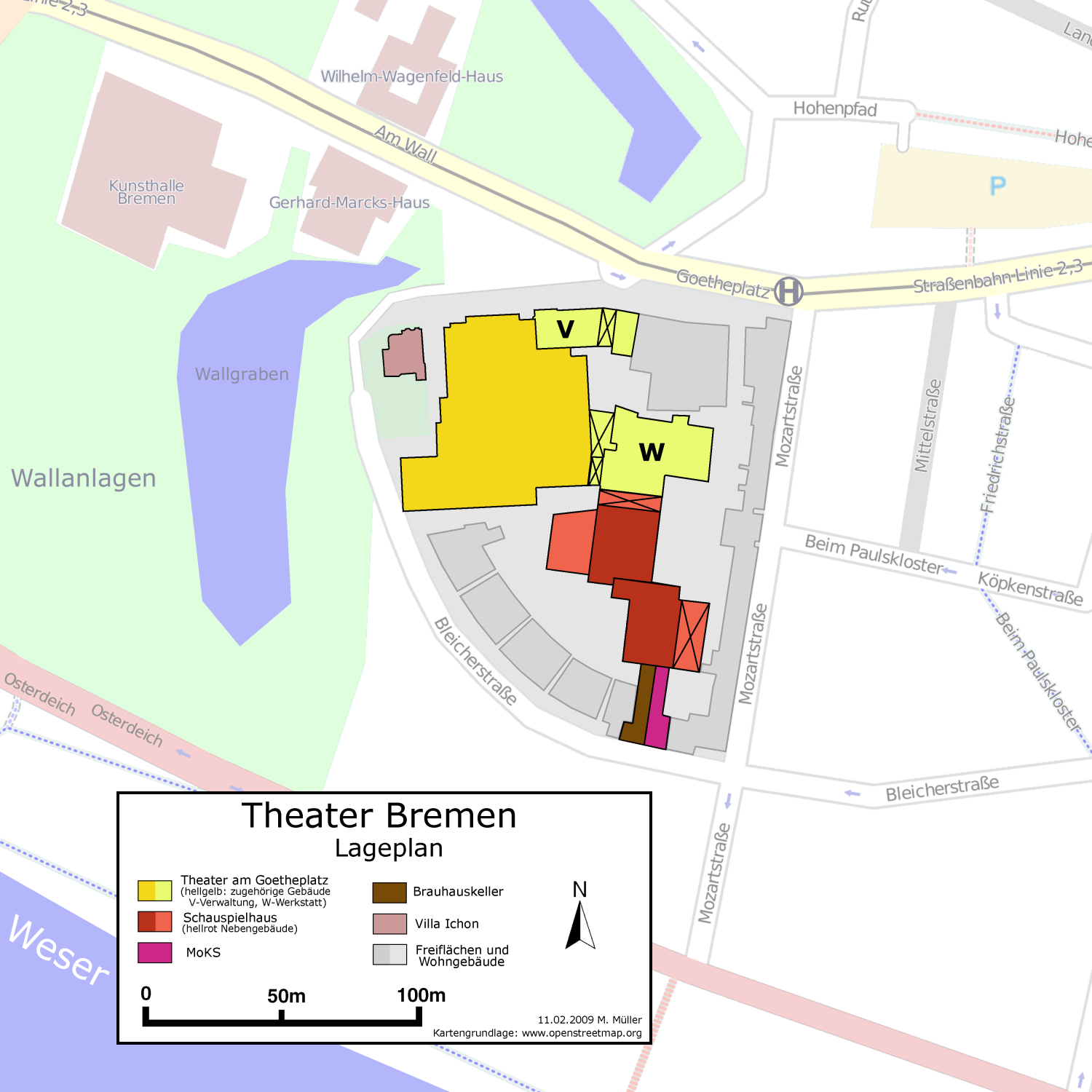
Location of the theatres

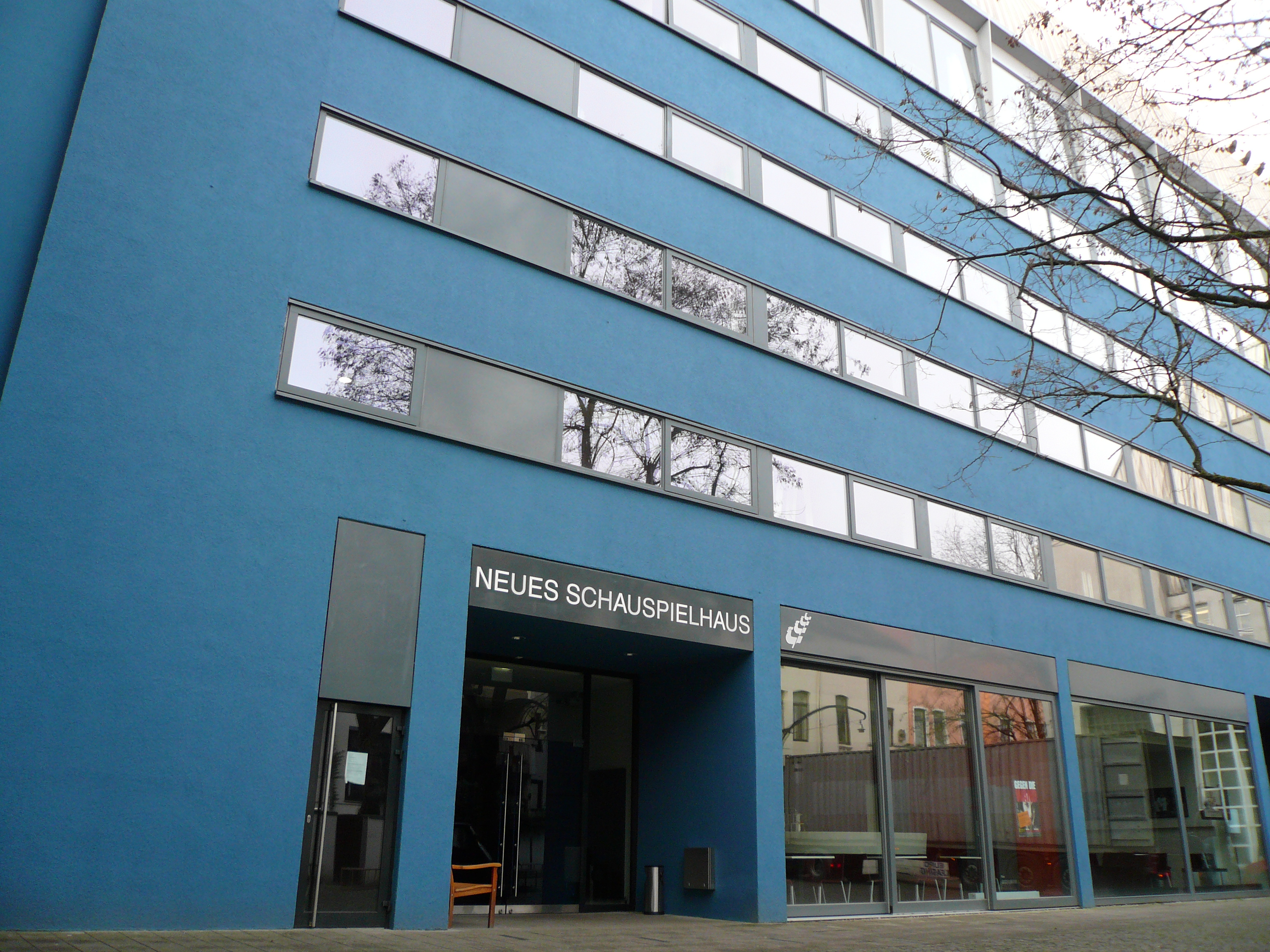
The playhouse

The buildings of Theater Bremen are located east of the Old Town next to the Bremer Wallanlagen. They are close to the museums Gerhard Marcks House and Wilhelm Wagenfeld House, the Villa Ichon, the central library of the Stadtbibliothek Bremen and the Kunsthalle Bremen, forming the so-called Kulturmeile (culture mile). The theatre buildings are located in one city block and connected in architecture. They are known as the Theater am Goetheplatz, Kleines Haus, Moks and Brauhauskeller.

The Theater am Goetheplatz was opened in 1913 as a playhouse with a play by Oscar Wilde. It was destroyed in World War II and restored as a theatre for opera and plays. Reopened in 1950, it seats 800 people.

The Kleines Haus was remodelled in the 2012/13 season, seating up to 200 people, and presents plays and dance theatre. The foyer has a stage called "noon" for chamber concerts, lectures and other events.

Moks is a theatre for children and youth, offering performances for school classes in the morning and young people and their families in the evening. All spectators are close to the stage. The quality of productions has been regarded as high, receiving more than regional attention. Several plays were presented at a theatre competition.

The Brauhauskeller is located in the basement vaults of the former St. Pauli brewery. A small stage is intended for events for up to 60 spectators. It is the venue for the group Junge Akteure (young actors), which was founded in 2005, based on the Moks, as the theatre school of Theater Bremen. The stage is narrow and long, requiring unconventional sets. The theatre has around 400 employees.

== Awards ==
In 1979, Theater Bremen was named Theater des Jahres (theatre of the year) by Theater heute. A 1997 production of Verdi's Macbeth was awarded the Bayerischer Theaterpreis. In 2007, the Theater Bremen was named Opernhaus des Jahres (Opera House of the Year) by Opernwelt, along with the Komische Oper Berlin. The Europäischer Toleranzpreis (European tolerance prize) of the KulturForum Europa was given for Ludger Vollmer's opera Gegen die Wand in 2009.

== Literature ==
- Hermann Tardel (ed.): Studien zur Bremischen Theatergeschichte. Oldenburg 1945
- Franz Reichert: Durch meine Brille. Österreichischer Bundesverlag, Vienna 1986, ISBN 3-215-06062-0
- Michael Mrukwa: Das Bremer Staatstheater und das Bremer Schauspielhaus von 1933–45. Master's thesis, Bremen 1987
- Bremer Theater der Freien Hansestadt Bremen GmbH, Senator für Kultur und Ausländerintegration der Freien Hansestadt Bremen (ed.): 200 Jahre Theater in Bremen. WMIT-Druck-u. Verlags GmbH, Bremen 1993, ISBN 3-929542-04-8
- Herbert Schwarzwälder: Das Große Bremen-Lexikon, Edition Temmen, Bremen 2003, ISBN 3-86108-693-X
- Lutz-Uwe Dünnwald (ed.): Theater am Goetheplatz. Sanierung 2003–2004. Isensee GmbH, Oldenburg 2005
- Frank Schümann: Bremer Theater 1913–2007. Schünemann Verlag, Bremen 2007, ISBN 978-3-7961-1903-3
- Klaus Pierwoß, Helmut Brade, Frank Schümann: Bremer Theater: Intendanz Klaus Pierwoß 1994/95–2006/07, Schünemann Verlag, Bremen 2007, ISBN 978-3-7961-1895-1
- Statistisches Landesamt Bremen, ed. (December 2017), Statistisches Jahrbuch 2017 (PDF) (in German), Bremen, ISSN 0942-9883
