= Eduard Ichon =

German theatre director

Eduard Ichon (27 December 1879 - 19 January 1943 in Bremen) was a German director, and theatre director, who was founder and director of the Schauspielhaus in Bremen.
