= Gerhard Marcks House =

Museum in Bremen, Germany

Coordinates: 53°04′21″N 8°48′53″E

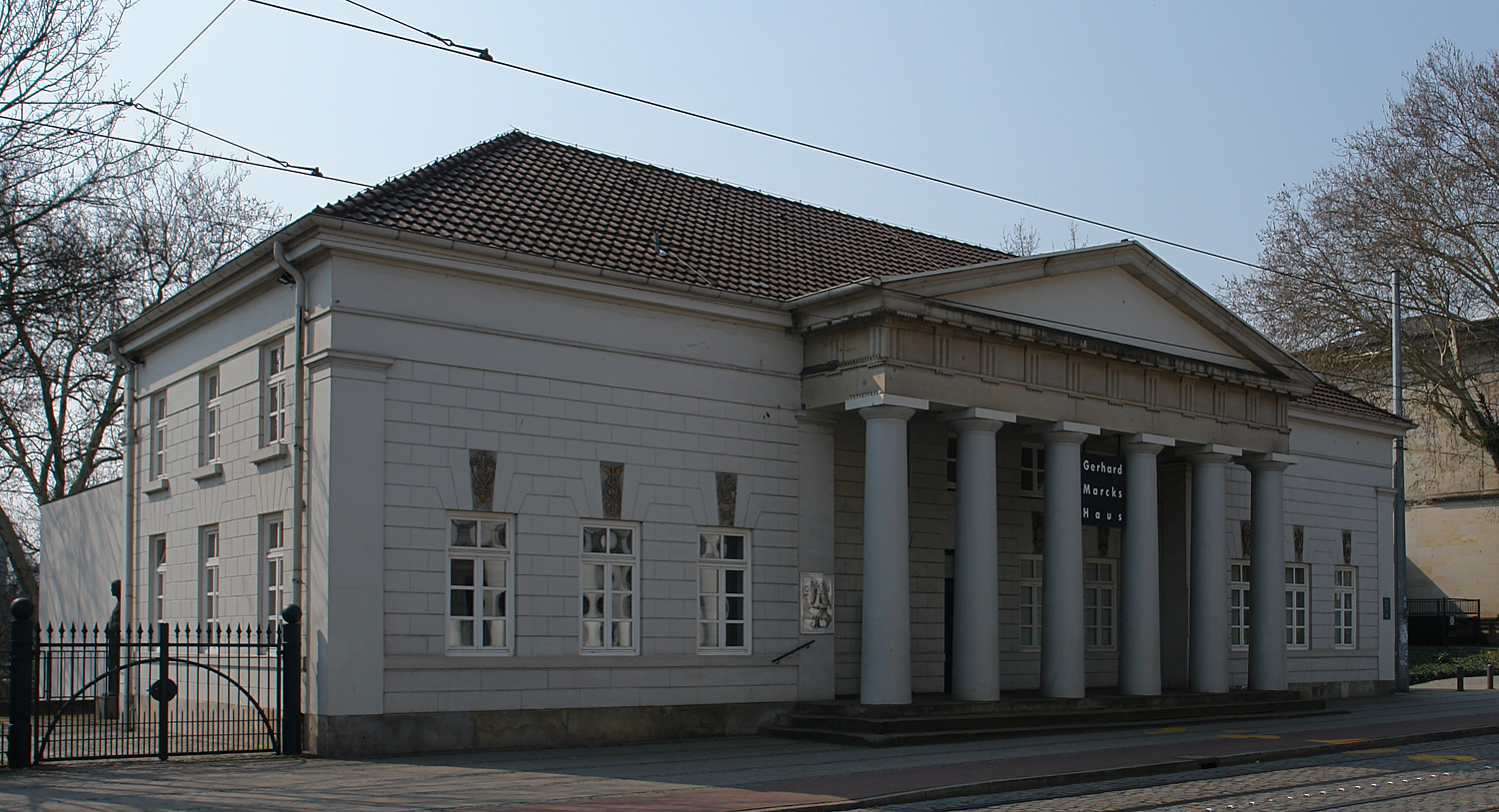
- The museum
- Established: 1971
- Location: D-28195, Bremen
- Website: www.marcks.de

The Gerhard Marcks Museum or Gerhard Marcks House (German: Gerhard Marcks Haus) is a museum in Bremen, Germany, inspired by the work of the sculptor and graphic artist Gerhard Marcks. The museum exhibits contemporary sculpture, including the work of Marcks.

== Building history ==
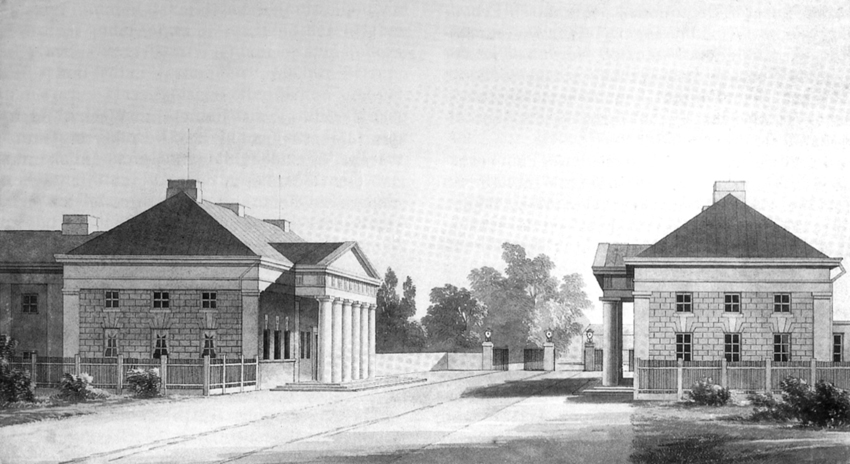
The Gerhard Marcks House (Right) was part of a pair built in 1825.

The Gerhard Marcks Museum's building and Wilhelm Wagenfeld House were built as a pair in 1825. The two buildings were designed to be a gatehouse and a prison located on either side of the road as you approached or left the town. They were both designed by the architect Friedrich Moritz Stamm. Until 1848 these buildings were used to close the city at night and to charge any customs tax that was due on goods travelling across the city's perimeter. The museum's building has been extended twice to create space for its new function as a museum. The conversion work was done in 1991 by Peter Schnorrenberger and was designed to complement the existing building. Although the two buildings have only one row of windows at the front, they both have two storeys and matching Doric columns.

== Marcks and his museum ==
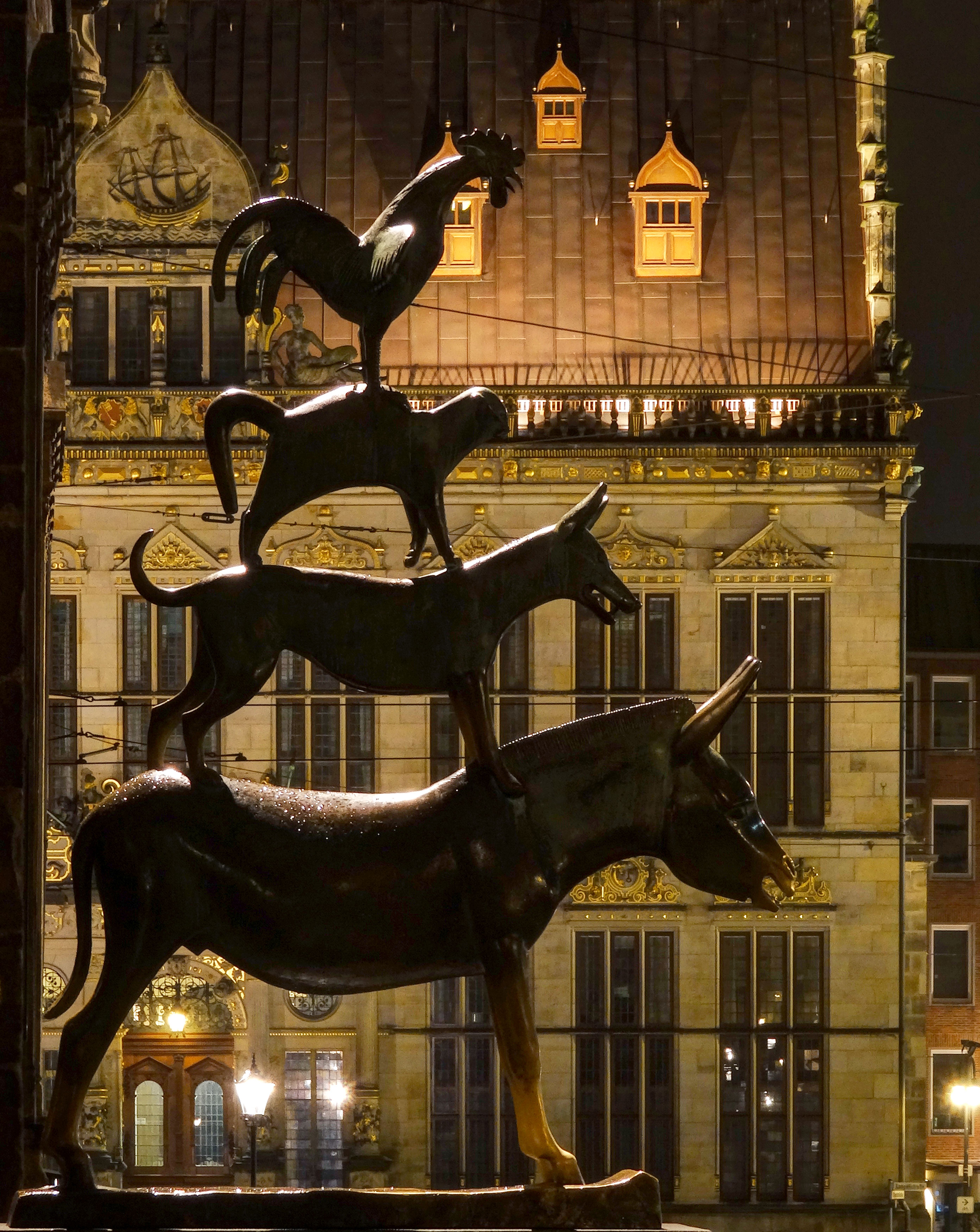
Musicians of Bremen outline at night

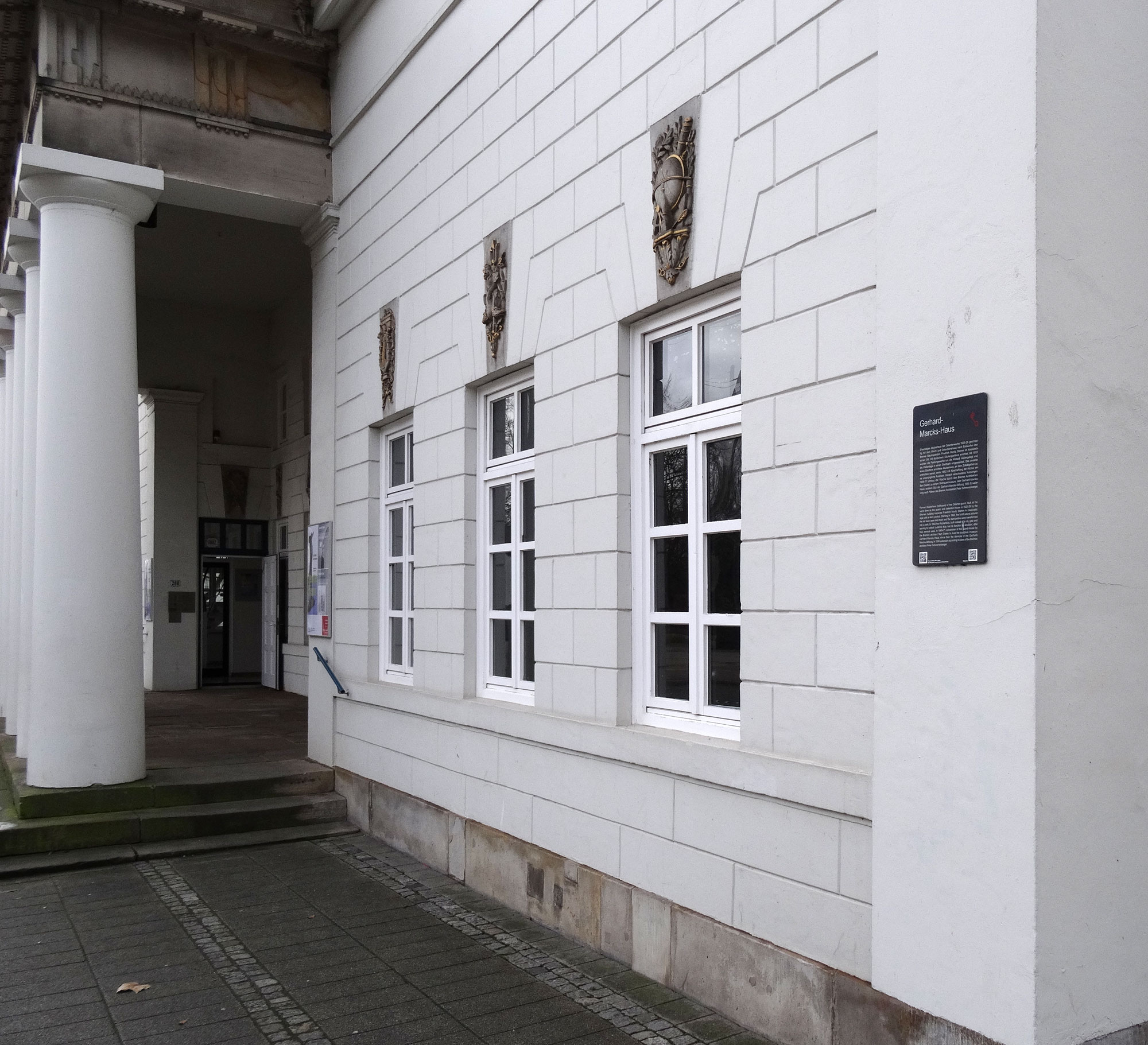
Information plaque with a QRpedia code to this article

Gerhard Marcks was already acknowledged in his home city as a great sculptor when he was chosen to create a sculpture that characterises the most famous story about Bremen. The Bremen Town Musicians was completed in 1953 and was paid for by public subscription after it was installed on trust by Marcks. The local tourist board acknowledge the sculpture as one of the town's most iconic attractions. Marcks also created The Caller which was installed in the city in 1967 but it was moved to the Brandenburg Gate in Berlin in 1989 because it represented the call to freedom.

A foundation for Marcks was established in 1969 with the idea of a museum to preserve the works of the sculptor and graphic artist. The idea for the museum came from Günter Busch who had led the local Kunsthalle gallery. The museum opened in 1971. Marcks lived until 1982 having become one of Germany's leading sculptors. The museum is part of what is known as the Cultural Mile which includes the Wilhelm Wagenfeld House, the Bremen Theatre and the Kunsthalle art gallery.

== Description ==
The Gerhard Marcks Museum exhibits contemporary sculpture, including the work of Marcks. The museum holds 400 of Marcks's sculptures, over 1,200 of his prints and 12,000 of his drawings. The museum has permanent exhibitions and hosts temporary exhibitions of famous and aspiring artists. The museum charges for entry, but has an occasional free day. The museum has a plaque outside in both German and English with QR codes that link to this article.
