= Theater am Goetheplatz =

Theater in Bremen, Germany

Coordinates: 53°4′20″N 8°48′55″E

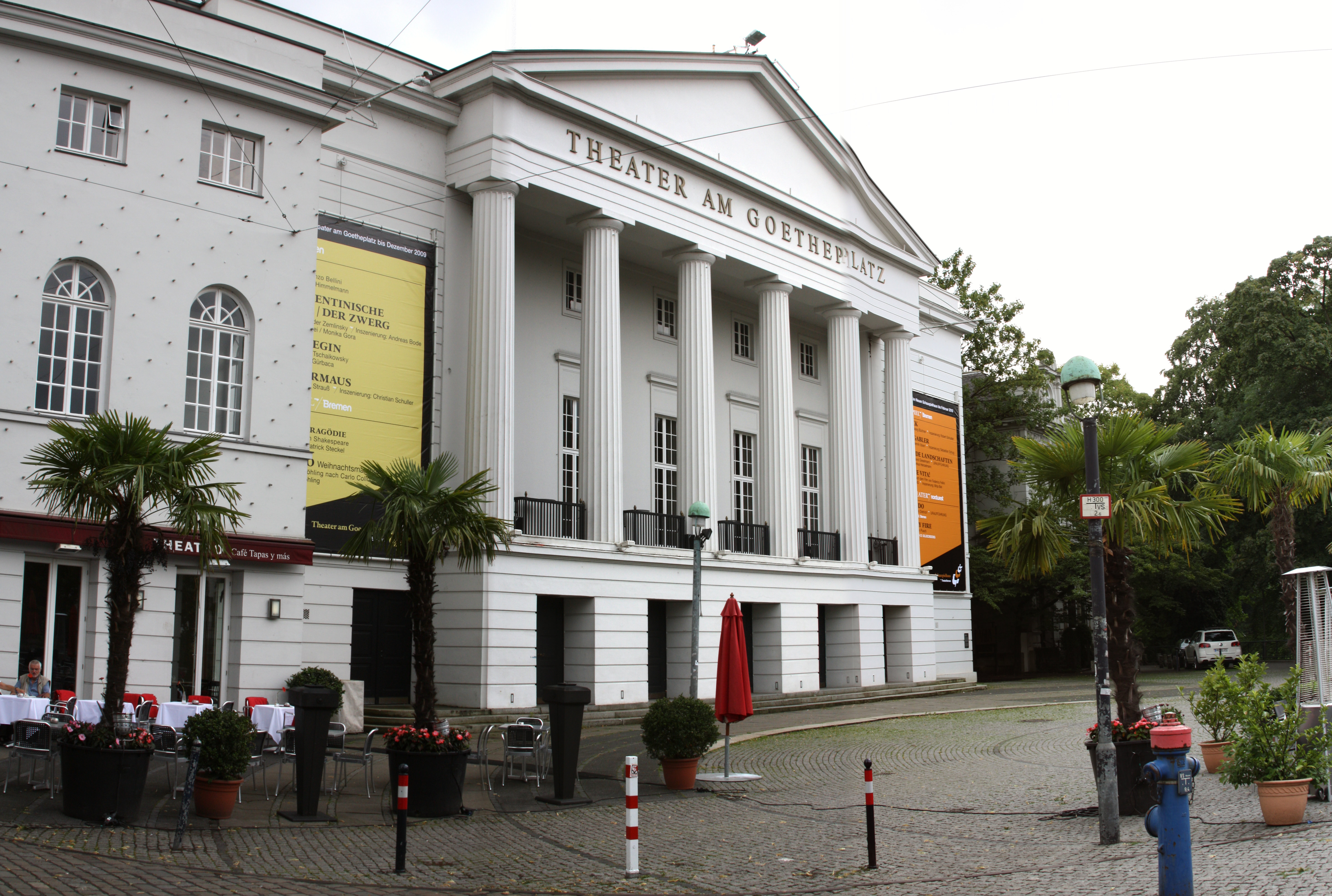
Theater am Goetheplatz

The Theater am Goetheplatz, also incorrectly known as the Goethetheater, is the main theatre of the city of Bremen in the north of Germany, the main venue of Theater Bremen. Completed in 1913 in the Neoclassical style, it is located in the cultural district to the east of the old town. After reconstruction with major extensions after the Second World War, it was fully modernized in 2004. Since 2005, it has been a listed building.

== History ==
Under the name Schauspielhaus am Ostertor, the theatre was founded as the second establishment of the private firm Bremer Schaubühne. In so doing, the firm's directors Eduard Ichon and Johannes Wiegand, who in 1910 had opened the Schauspielhaus am Neustadtwall, widened competition with the municipal theatre, Stadttheater am Wall (now destroyed). Adapting their prices and presentations to suit all segments of the community, they were particularly successful in attracting audiences in the years following the First World War. The theatre opened in 1913 with a production of Oscar Wilde's Eine Frau ohne Bedeutung (A Woman of No Importance).

After the municipal theatre had suffered serious war damage, it was decided the Schauspielhaus am Ostertor should be rebuilt as a fully-fledged three-genre establishment extending the seating from 804 to 1,111 while significantly altering the facade designed by August Abbehusen and Otto Blendermann in 1913. In keeping with the practices of the 1950s, the architects Werner Commichau and Hans Stormraising raised the height of the colonnade and eliminated the high hipped roof, successfully simplifying the facade and giving it a more austere appearance. The theatre reopened in 1950. In 2004, extensive modernization was carried out by the Hamburg firm of architects, Dinse Feest Zurl Architekten. Care was taken to meet acoustic specifications in work entailing raising the roof, installing new sound and light systems and in cladding the walls with wooden panelling and brass inlays.

Today the theatre presents productions of musicals, opera and drama. In 2007, it received the magazine Opernwelt's award Opernhaus des Jahres (Opera house of the year).
