= Wilhelm Wagenfeld =

German industrial designer (1900–1990)

- Born: 15 April 1900; Bremen
- Died: 28 May 1990 (aged 90); Stuttgart
- Education: Bauhaus
- Occupations: Designer; industrial designer; photographer

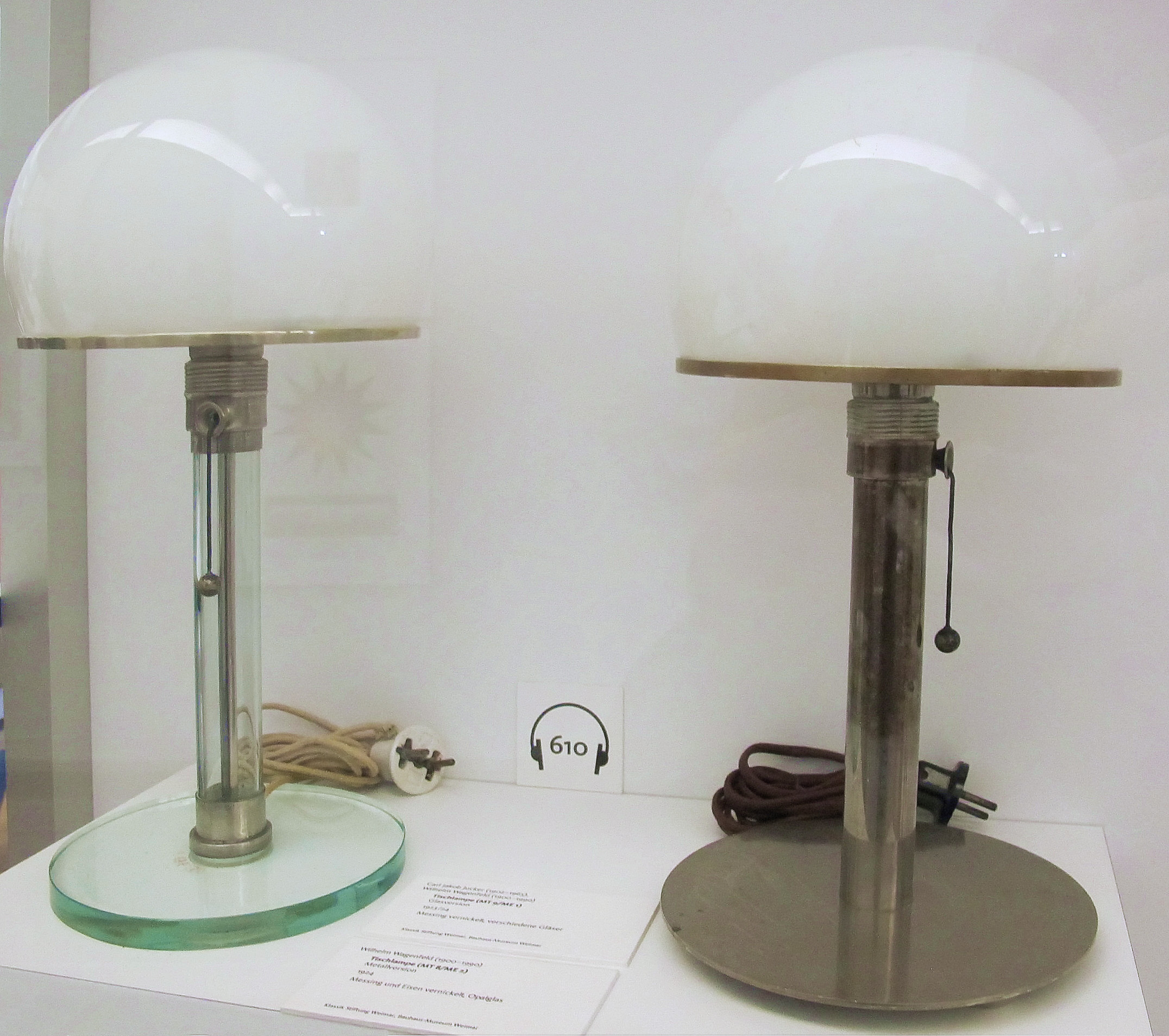
WA24 Wagenfeld lamp (1924)

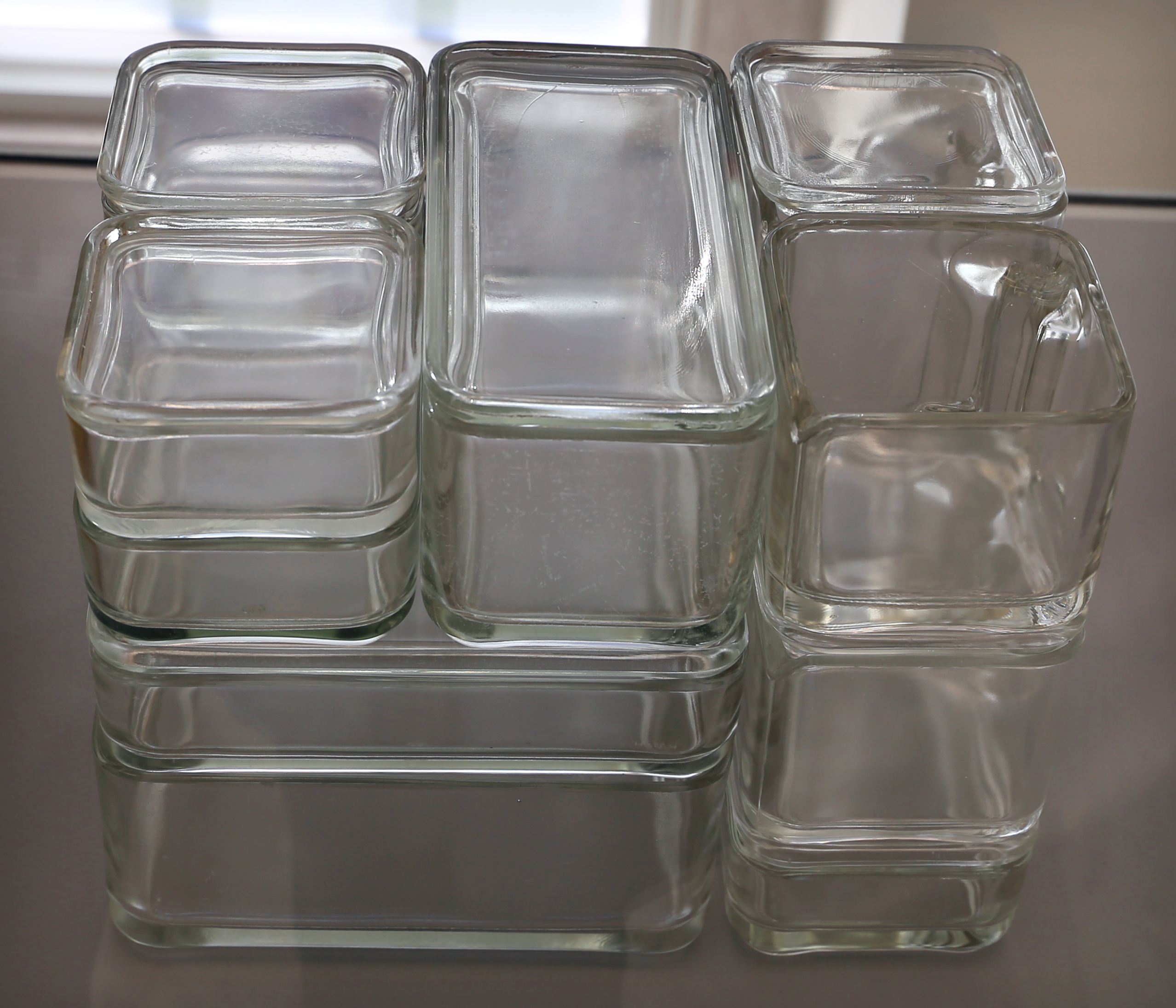
Kubus glass storage containers (c. 1938))

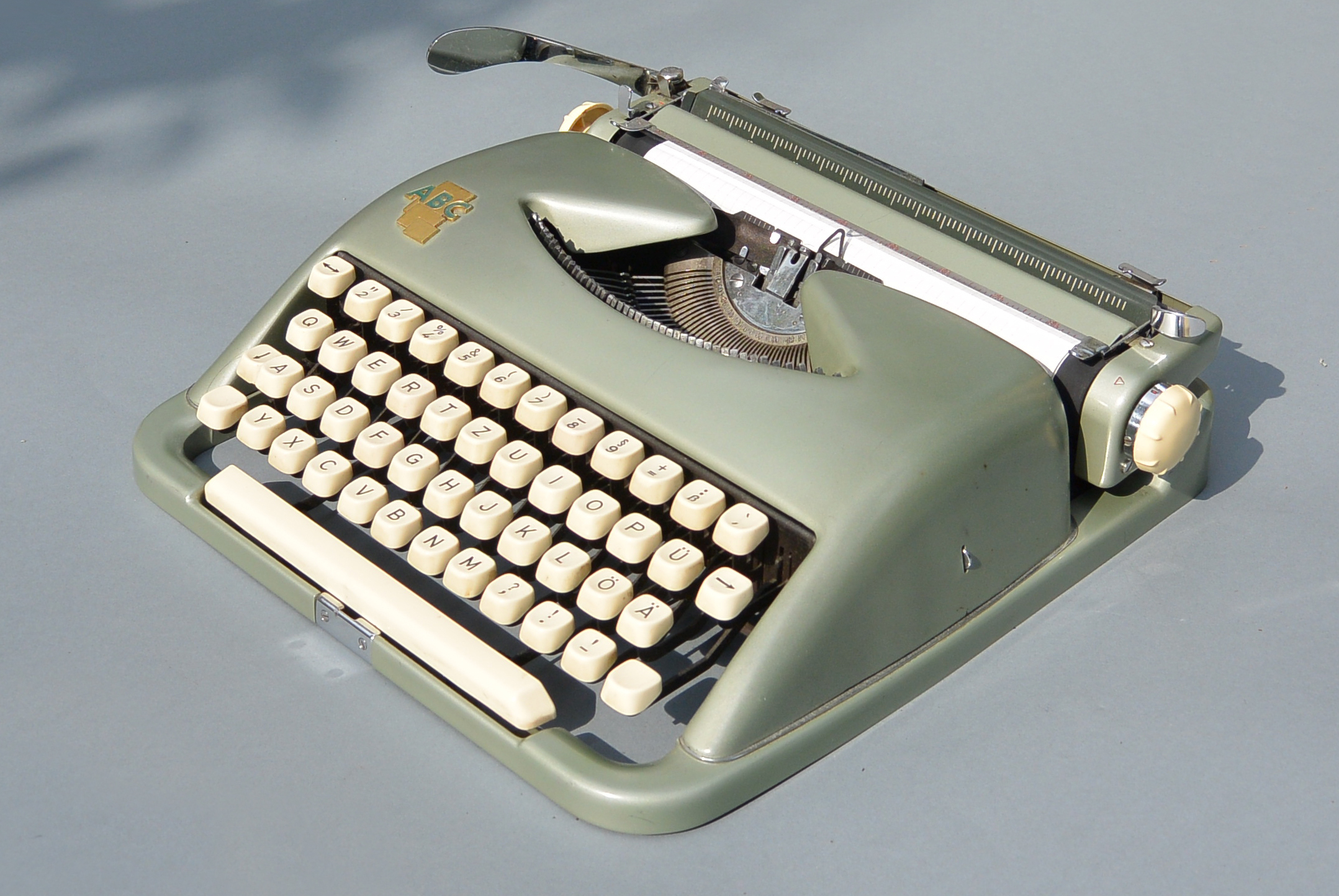
ABC portable typewriter (1950s)

Wilhelm Wagenfeld (15 April 1900, Bremen, German Empire — 28 May 1990, Stuttgart, West Germany) was a German industrial designer and former student of the Bauhaus art school. He designed glass and metal works for the Jenaer Glaswerk Schott & Gen., the Vereinigte Lausitzer Glaswerke in Weißwasser, Rosenthal, Braun GmbH and WMF. Some of his designs are still produced to this day.

== Biography ==
Wagenfeld undertook an apprenticeship as an industrial technical drawer at Koch & Bergfeld, a Bremen silverware factory from 1914 to 1918, attending the Bremen Kunstgewerbeschule (a school of applied arts) from 1916 to 1919. He trained to become a silversmith at the Zeichenakademie Hanau from 1919 to 1922. From 1923 to 1925 he studied at Bauhaus in Weimar. He undertook a preliminary course with László Moholy-Nagy in his third year, and later trained in the Bauhaus metal workshop. During this time he designed some of his famous works, such as the Bauhaus WA24 'Wagenfeld lamp' in 1924.

When the Bauhaus in Weimar closed in April 1925, in order to move to Dessau, he did not go with it to complete his studies, but stayed in Weimar. After completing his journeyman's exams in silversmithing he became a member of the German Werkbund. He took the position an assistant in the metal workshop at the Staatlichen Hochschule für Handwerk und Baukunst Weimar, (State Academy of Crafts and Architecture) on 1 April 1926, and on 1 April 1928 he became head of the department. The school closed on 1 April 1930 due to Nazi pressure, but Wagner and the other tutors received the rights to all designs they had developed while working at the school.

From then he began working freelance, undertaking a commission for the Thuringian Ministry of Economics. In 1931 he did some teaching at the State Academy of Art in Berlin-Schöneberg. From 1935 to 1947 he was the artistic director of the Vereinigte Lausitzer Glaswerke (United Lausitzer Glass Works) in Weisswasser. His work won a prize at the 1937 Exposition Internationale des Arts et Techniques dans la Vie Moderne (International Exposition of Art and Technology in Modern Life), and he also won a prize at the 1940 Milan Triennial VII.

Wagenfeld refused to join the Nazi party and as punishment he was sent as a "political pest" to serve on the Eastern Front with the flying corp. He was captured in 1945 and held in a Russian prisoner of war camp until September 1945, when he returned to Weisswasser.

== Work ==
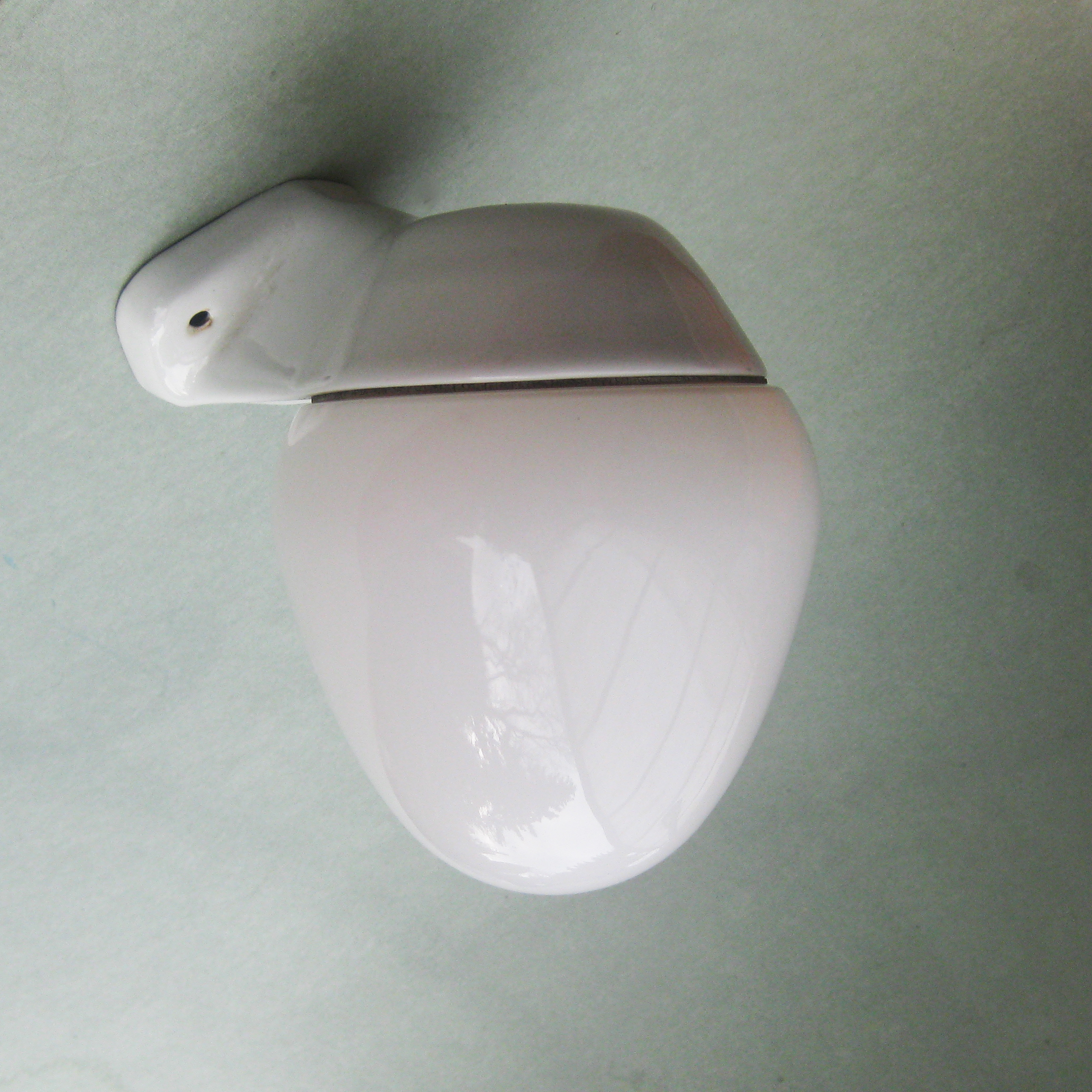
Lamp WV 343 for Lindner Leuchten, 1955

Wagenfeld believed that everyday household objects should be "cheap enough for the worker and good enough for the rich."

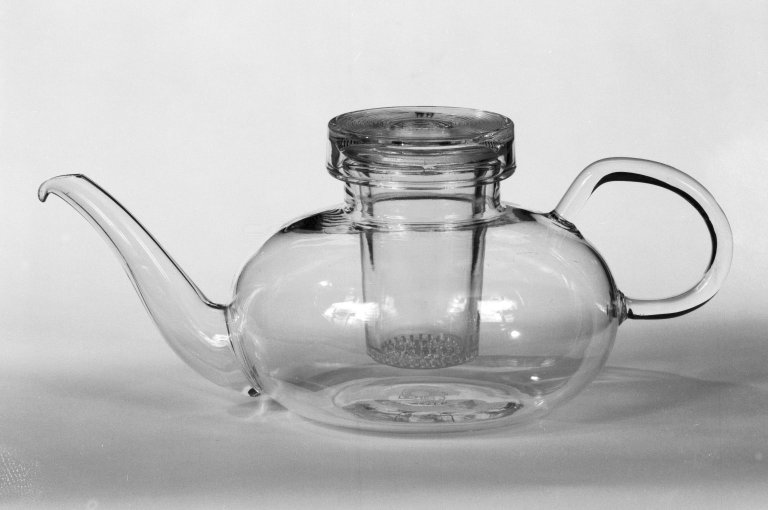
Teapot, 1930 -1934. Brooklyn Museum

One of his classics is a table lamp, known as Wagenfeld Lampe, 1924, which he designed together with Karl J. Jucker. His famously stripped-down tea service, designed in 1938, is still in production.

== Legacy ==
Wilhelm Wagenfeld House, a brief walk from the Kunsthalle Bremen, is a museum dedicated to the work of the Bremen-born Bauhaus designer. It was originally built in 1828 as a neoclassical jail, later used for interrogations by the Gestapo and, until the 1990s, offered crowded accommodation to unsuccessful asylum-seekers awaiting deportation. Wagenfeld House also houses the Design Center, which sponsors symposia and provides a forum for young designers.

There is a design school in Bremen named after him, the Wilhelm-Wagenfeld-Schule.

Wilhelm Wagenfeld's grandson Malte Wagenfeld is senior lecturer and program director for industrial design at the RMIT University in Melbourne, Australia.

== Bibliography ==
- Manske, Beate, ed. (2000). Wilhelm Wagenfeld: (1900–1990). Ostfildern: Hatje Cantz. ISBN 978-3-7757-0886-9.
- Manske, Beate; Scholz, Gudrun, eds. (2005) [1987]. Täglich in der Hand: Industrieformen von Wilhelm Wagenfeld aus sechs Jahrzehnten [Daily in His Hand: Industrial Forms of Wilhelm Wagenfeld from Six Decades] (in German) (5 ed.). Achim: Beste Zeiten Verlagsgesellschaft mbH – Worpsweder Verlag. ISBN 3-88808-550-0.
- Scheiffele, Walter (1994). Wilhelm Wagenfeld und die moderne Glasindustrie [Wilhelm Wagenfeld and the Modern Glass Industry] (in German). Ostfildern: Hatje Cantz Verlag. ISBN 978-3-7757-0488-5.

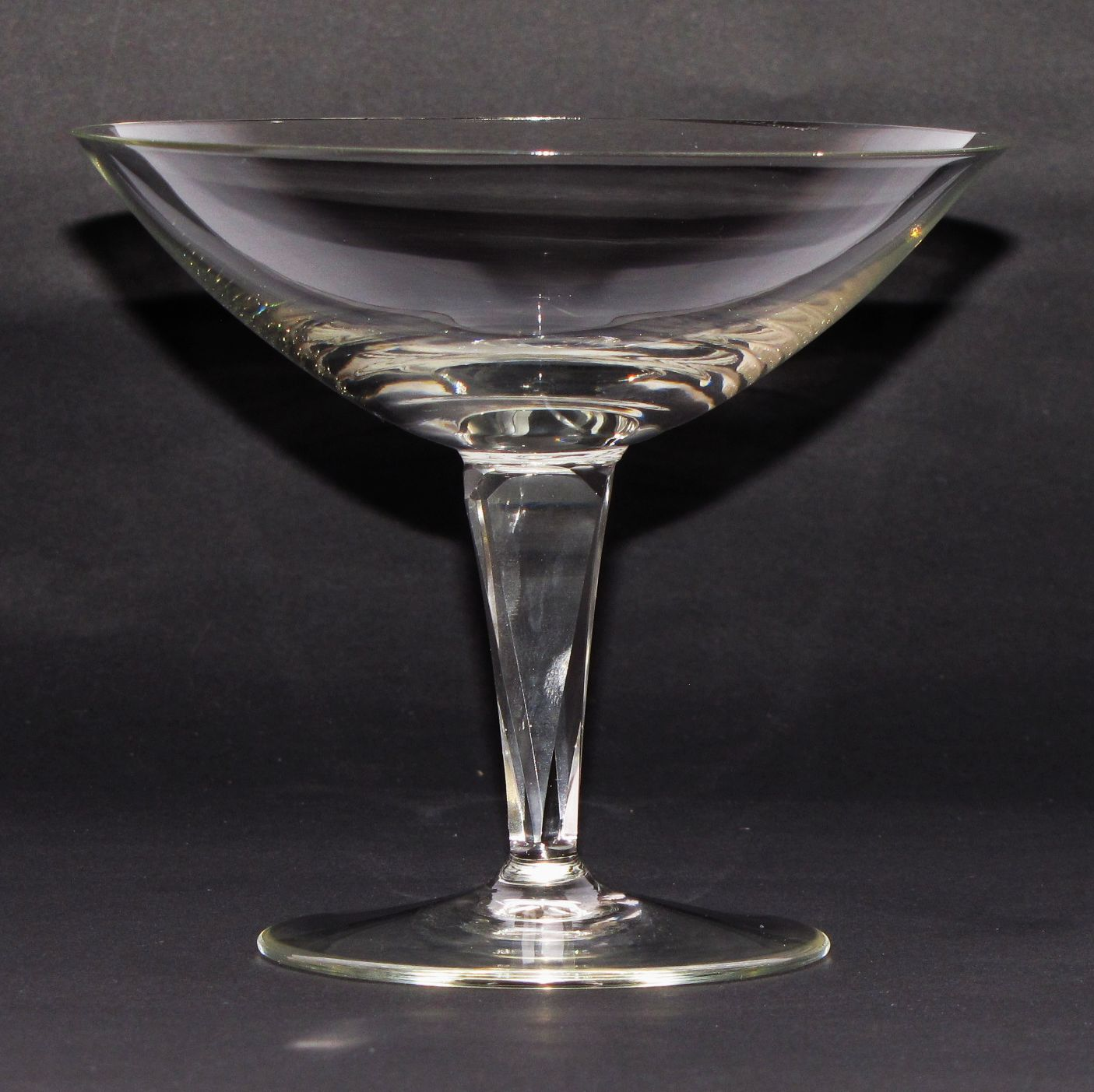
Sektschale Glasservice "Lobenstein" champagne cup glass service "Lobenstein"
