= Wilhelm Wagenfeld House =

Design museum and exhibition centre in Bremen, Germany

Coordinates: 53°4′23″N 8°48′53″E

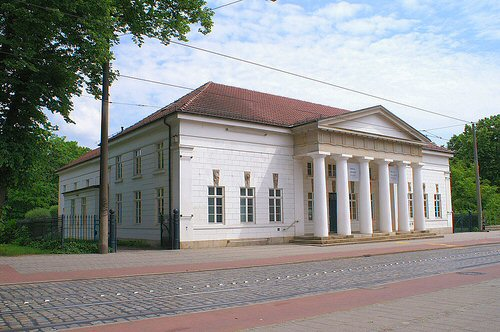
Wilhelm Wagenfeld House

Wilhelm Wagenfeld House, Bremen

Wilhelm Wagenfeld House (German: Wilhelm-Wagenfeld-Haus) is a design museum and exhibition centre in Bremen, Germany. Completed in the Neoclassical style in 1828, the building now carries the name of Bremen-born Wilhelm Wagenfeld (1900–1990), a major contributor to the 20th-century design of household objects. In addition to a collection of Wagenfeld's creations, the building hosts temporary design exhibitions. It is located in Bremen's Old Town (Altstadt) close to the Kunsthalle Bremen art museum.

== History and architecture ==
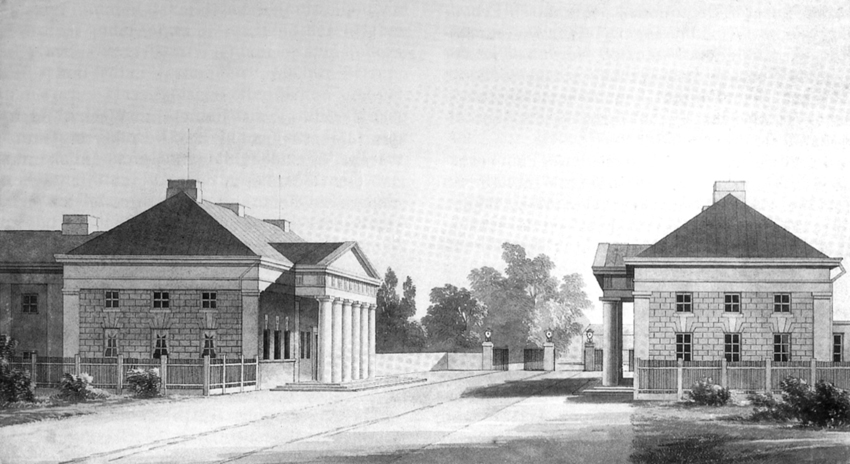
The building (left) in 1825

The Gerhard Marcks House opposite and this building were designed by Friedrich Moritz Stamm. They were both plain two-storey rendered buildings with a Doric portico. The absence of upstairs windows overlooking the street gives them both a closed look. The windows at the front and in the rear of the building are decorated with military reliefs designed by Heinrich Frese and completed in 1973. They depict helmets, shields, swords and military emblems. Originally known as the Detentionshaus, a component of the Ostertorwache, the building served as a prison and police station. In 1966, the police left the building prior to its conversion into an exhibition centre and office building.

== Current use ==
In collaboration with the Wilhelm Wagenfeld Foundation, Bremer Design GmbH uses the exhibition centre to promote the creative industries which are so important to Bremen's development. It offers opportunities to benefit from exhibitions of important international successes while also displaying the innovative results of local enterprise with a view to wider marketing.

The building also houses the offices of the Wagenfeld Foundation while the Ostertorwache archives tracing the building's history as a prison, including its use by the Gestapo from 1933, have been open to the public since 1999.

== See also ==
- Gerhard Marcks House
