= Second Bovenschulte senate =

State government of Bremen

Second Senate of Andreas Bovenschulte Senate Bovenschulte II
- 26th Senate of Bremen
- 5 July 2023 – present
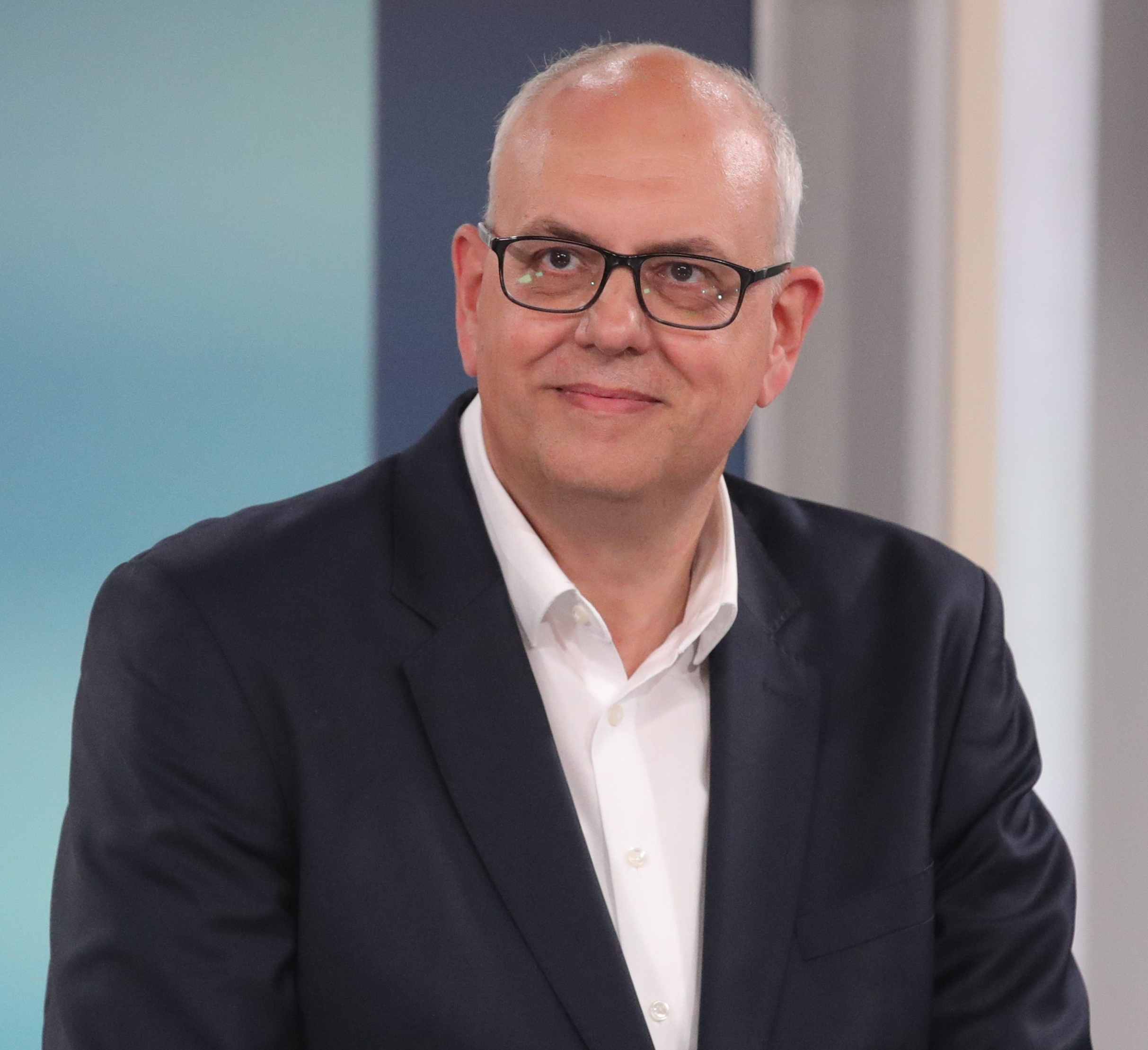
- Andreas Bovenschulte in May 2023
- Date formed: 5 July 2023

People and organisations
- Mayor: Andreas Bovenschulte
- Deputy Mayor: Björn Fecker
- No. of ministers: 8
- Member parties: Social Democratic Party; Alliance 90/The Greens; The Left
- Status in legislature: Coalition government (Majority); 48 / 87 (55%)
- Opposition parties: Christian Democratic Union; Citizens in Rage; Free Democratic Party

History
- Election: 2023 Bremen state election
- Legislature term: 21st Bürgerschaft of Bremen
- Predecessor: First Bovenschulte senate

The Second Bovenschulte senate is the current state government of Bremen, sworn in on 5 July 2023 after Andreas Bovenschulte was elected as Mayor by the members of the Bürgerschaft of Bremen. It is the 26th Senate of Bremen.

It was formed after the 2023 Bremen state election by the Social Democratic Party (SPD), Alliance 90/The Greens (GRÜNE), and The Left (LINKE). Excluding the Mayor, the senate comprises eight ministers, called Senators. Four are members of the SPD, two are members of the Greens, and two are members of The Left.

== Formation ==
The previous Senate was a coalition government of the SPD, Greens, and Left led by Mayor Andreas Bovenschulte of the SPD.

The election took place on 14 May 2023, and resulted in a swing to the SPD and a losses for the Greens. The Left remained steady. The opposition CDU lost its position as the largest party to the SPD. The FDP narrowly retained its seats with 5%, while BiW recorded their best result to date with 9%.

After the election, Mayor Bovenschulte held exploratory talks with the Greens followed by The Left. All three parties spoke positively of the discussions. The SPD and CDU met for talks on the 21st. On the 25th, the SPD state board unanimously voted to seek negotiations to renew the outgoing government.

Coalition negotiations commenced on 30 May and finalised on 25 June, with the three parties presenting their agreement the following day. Compared to the previous government, the SPD gained one senator at the expense of the Greens. The contract was overwhelmingly approved by all three parties at meetings at the start of July.

Bovenschulte was re-elected Mayor by the Bürgerschaft on 5 July, winning 49 votes out of 86 cast.

== Composition ==
Portfolio	Senator	Party	Took office	Left office	State secretaries
President of the Senate and Mayor; Senator for Religious Affairs; Senator for Culture	Andreas Bovenschulte born 11 August 1965 (age 61)	SPD	5 July 2023	Incumbent	Thomas Ehmke (Head of the Senate Chancellery); Olaf Joachim (Representative to the Federal Government and Europe) (to May 2025); Nancy Böhning (Representative to the Federal Government and Europe) (from June 2025); Carmen Emigholz (Culture)
Mayor; Senator for Finance	Björn Fecker born 13 December 1977 (age 48)	GRÜNE	5 July 2023	Incumbent	Martin Hagen; Wiebke Stuhrberg
Senator for Children and Education	Sascha Karolin Aulepp born 24 September 1970 (age 56)	SPD	5 July 2023	8 October 2025	Torsten Klieme; Katharina von Fintel (from December 2023 to May 2025)
Senator for Children and Education	Mark Rackles born 26 September 1966 (age 60)	SPD	9 October 2025	Incumbent	Torsten Klieme; Jennifer Müller-Wilckens
Senator for Health, Women and Consumer Protection	Claudia Bernhard born 9 February 1961 (age 65)	LINKE	5 July 2023	Incumbent	Silke Stroth; Barbara Scriba-Hermann
Senator for Interior and Sport	Ulrich Mäurer born 14 July 1951 (age 75)	SPD	5 July 2023	11 December 2025	Olaf Bull
Senator for Interior and Sport	Eva Högl born 6 January 1969 (age 57)	SPD	12 December 2025	Incumbent	Olaf Bull
Senator for Labour, Social Affairs, Youth and Integration; Senator for Justice and Constitution	Claudia Schilling born 13 June 1968 (age 58)	SPD	5 July 2023	Incumbent	Kirsten Kreuzer (Social Affairs, Youth and Integration); Karin Treu (Labour) (to May 2025); Gunnar Isenberg (Labour) (from September 2025); Björn Tschöpe
Senator for Environment, Climate, and Science	Kathrin Moosdorf born 6 April 1981 (age 45)	GRÜNE	5 July 2023	4 October 2025	Jan Fries; Irene Strebl (to Sep. 2025)
Senator for Environment, Climate, and Science	Björn Fecker (acting) born 13 December 1977 (age 48)	GRÜNE	7 October 2025	12 November 2025	Jan Fries
Senator for Environment, Climate, and Science	Henrike Müller born 9 November 1975 (age 51)	GRÜNE	12 November 2025	Incumbent	Jan Fries; Karolina Kumar (from Dec. 2025)
Senator for Construction, Mobility and Urban Development	Özlem Ünsal born 16 May 1974 (age 52)	SPD	5 July 2023	Incumbent	Ralph Baumheier
Senator for Economics, Harbours and Transformation	Kristina Vogt born 3 June 1965 (age 61)	LINKE	5 July 2023	Incumbent	Sven Wiebe (Economics) (to Sep. 2023); Martin Bialluch (Economics) (from Sep. 2023 to Jan. 2024); Maike Frese (Economics) (from Apr. 2024); Kai Stührenberg (Harbours)
