= Tuukka =

- Gender: Male

Origin
- Origin: Finnish
- Region of origin: Finland

Other names
- Related names: Tore, Tor

Tuukka is a Finnish male given name. The origin of the name may be from the Scandinavian names Tore and Tor, but other studies suggest the origin comes from the names Thoke and Thuki.

People named Tuukka include:

- Tuukka Andberg (born 1998), Finnish footballer
- Tuukka Kotti (born 1981), Finnish basketball player
- Tuukka Mäkelä (1927–2005), Finnish sports shooter
- Tuukka Mäkelä (born 1982), Finnish ice hockey player
- Tuukka Mäntylä (born 1981), Finnish ice hockey player
- Tuukka Pulliainen (born 1984), Finnish ice hockey player
- Tuukka Rask (born 1987), Finnish ice hockey goaltender
- Tuukka Smura (born 1995), Finnish ice hockey goaltender
- Tuukka Taponen (born 2006), Finnish racing driver
- Tuukka Tiensuu (born 1953), Finnish TV-director, writer and producer
