= Thore (given name) =

Thore is a given name. Notable persons with the name include:

- Thore Güldner (born 1995), German politician
- Thore Schäck (born 1985), German economist and politician
- Thore Schölermann (born 1984), German actor and television host
- Thore Skogman (1931–2007), Swedish singer, songwriter, actor and entertainer

== See also ==
- Thor (given name)
- Tore (given name)
