= Thor (given name) =

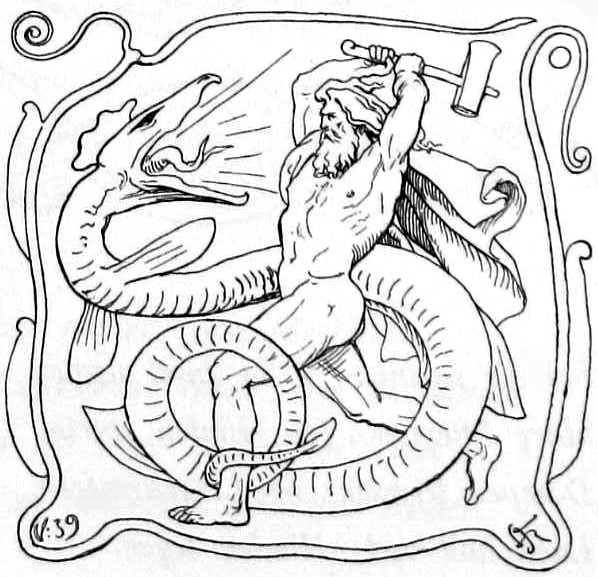
The final battle between Norse god Thor and Jörmungandr during Ragnarök.

Thor is a given name. Notable persons with the name include:

- Thor Aackerlund, early American esports player
- Thor Björgólfsson (born 1967), Icelandic entrepreneur
- Thor Bjørklund (1889–1975), Norwegian inventor
- Thor Breien (1899–1973), Norwegian judge
- Thor Christiansen (1957–1981), Danish-American serial killer
- Thor Erdahl (born 1951), Norwegian painter
- Thor Falkanger (born 1934), Norwegian legal scholar
- Thor Fossum (1916–1993), Norwegian politician
- Thor Furulund (1943–2016), Norwegian painter
- Thor Griffith, American football player
- Thor Gystad (1919–2007), Norwegian politician
- Thor Halvorssen (businessman) (1943–2014), Venezuelan-Norwegian businessman and ambassador
- Thor Halvorssen (human rights activist) (born 1976), Venezuelan human rights advocate and film producer
- Thor Hansen (1947–2018), Norwegian poker player
- Thor Harris (born 1965), American musician
- Thor Henning (1894–1967), Swedish swimmer
- Thor Heyerdahl (1914–2002), Norwegian explorer
- Thor Hushovd (born 1978), Norwegian road bicycle racer
- Thor Jensen (1889–1976), Norwegian gymnast
- Thor Knudsen (1927–2006), Norwegian politician
- Thor Kunkel (born 1963), German writer
- Thor Larsen (1886–1970), Norwegian gymnast
- Thor Lillehovde (born 1948), Norwegian politician
- Thor Longus (died 12th-century), Anglo-Saxon noble, active in Scotland
- Thor Lund (1921–1999), Norwegian politician
- Thor Munkager (1951–2017), Danish handball player
- Thor Myklebust (1908–1989), Norwegian politician
- Thor Nilsen (1931–2023), Norwegian rower
- Thor André Olsen (born 1964), Norwegian footballer and trainer
- Thor Ørvig (1891–1965), Norwegian sailor
- Thor Pedersen (disambiguation)
- Thor Salden (born 1997), Belgian singer
- Thor Sørheim (born 1949), Norwegian author
- Thor Thorvaldsen (1909–1987), Norwegian sailor
- Thor Tjøntveit (1936–2017), Norwegian-American aviator
- Thor C. Tollefson (1901–1982), American politician
- Thor of Tranent (fl. 1127–1150), Scottish landlord and chieftain
- Thor Vilhjálmsson (1925–2011), Icelandic writer

== See also ==
- Thore (given name)
- Tora (given name)
- Tore (given name)
