= 2023 Bremen state election =

Election in Bremen, Germany

- 14 May 2023

All 87 seats in the Bürgerschaft of Bremen 44 seats needed for a majority
- Registered: 460,778
- Turnout: 262,099 (56.9%) ▼7.2pp
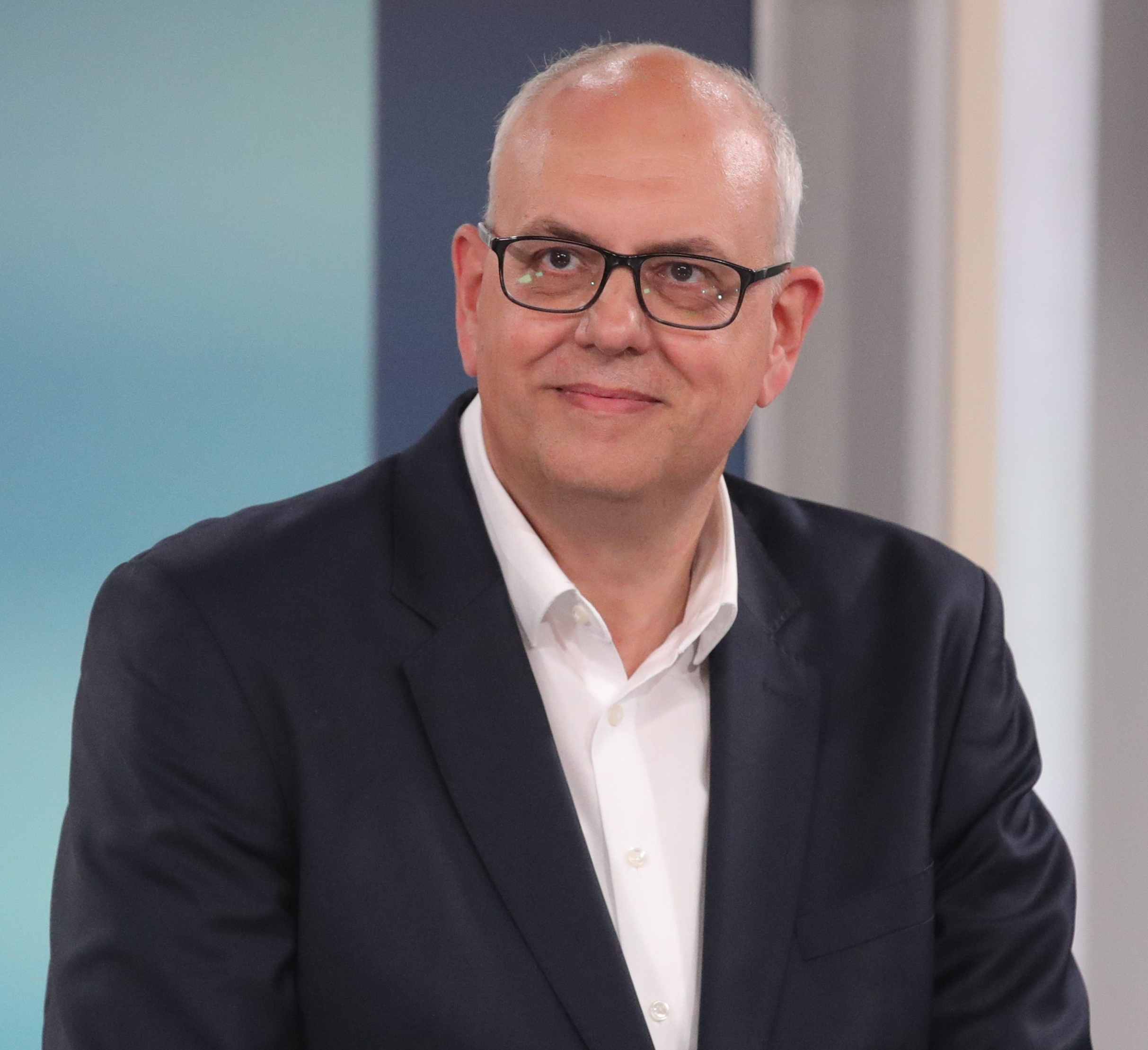

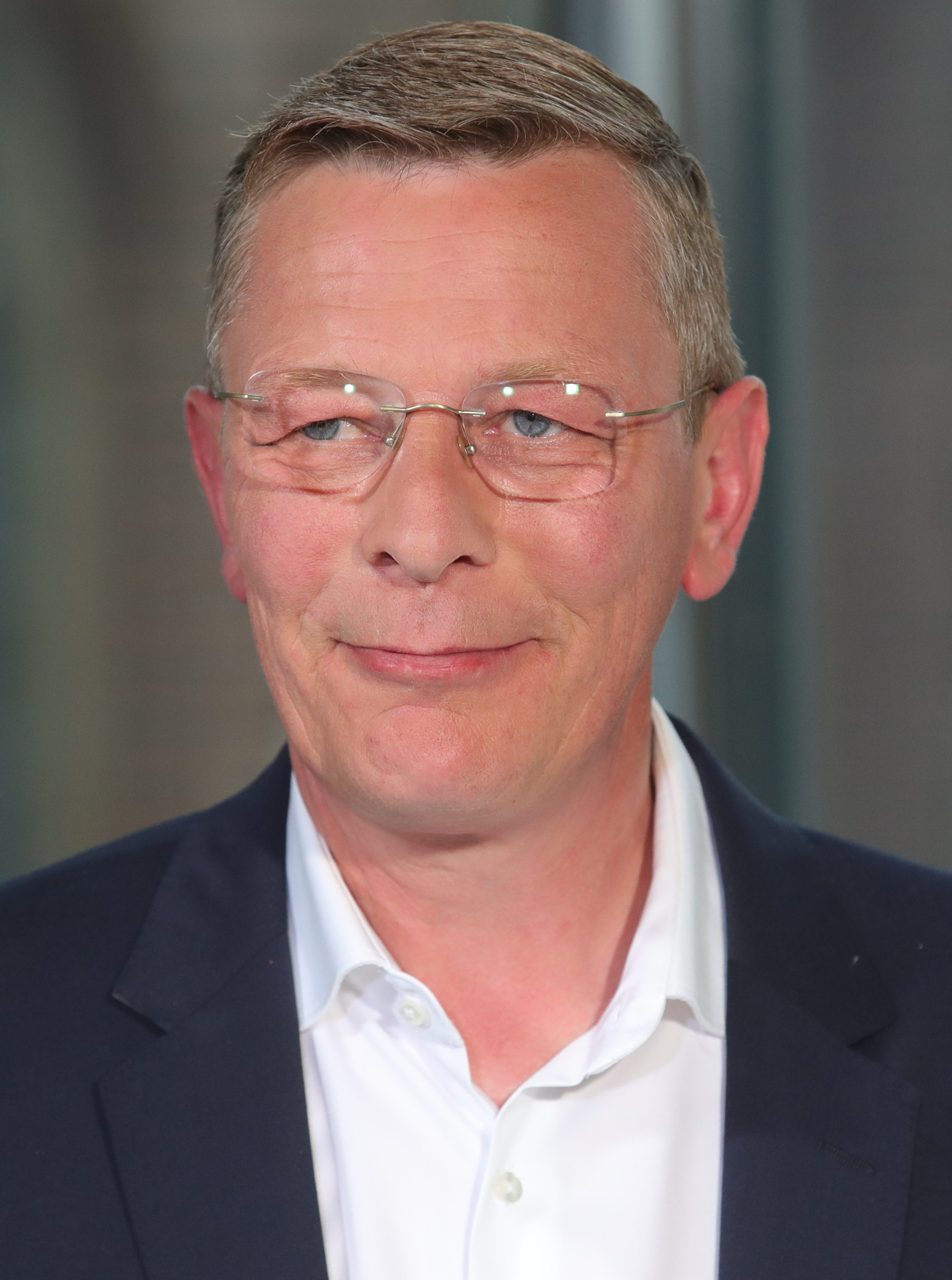

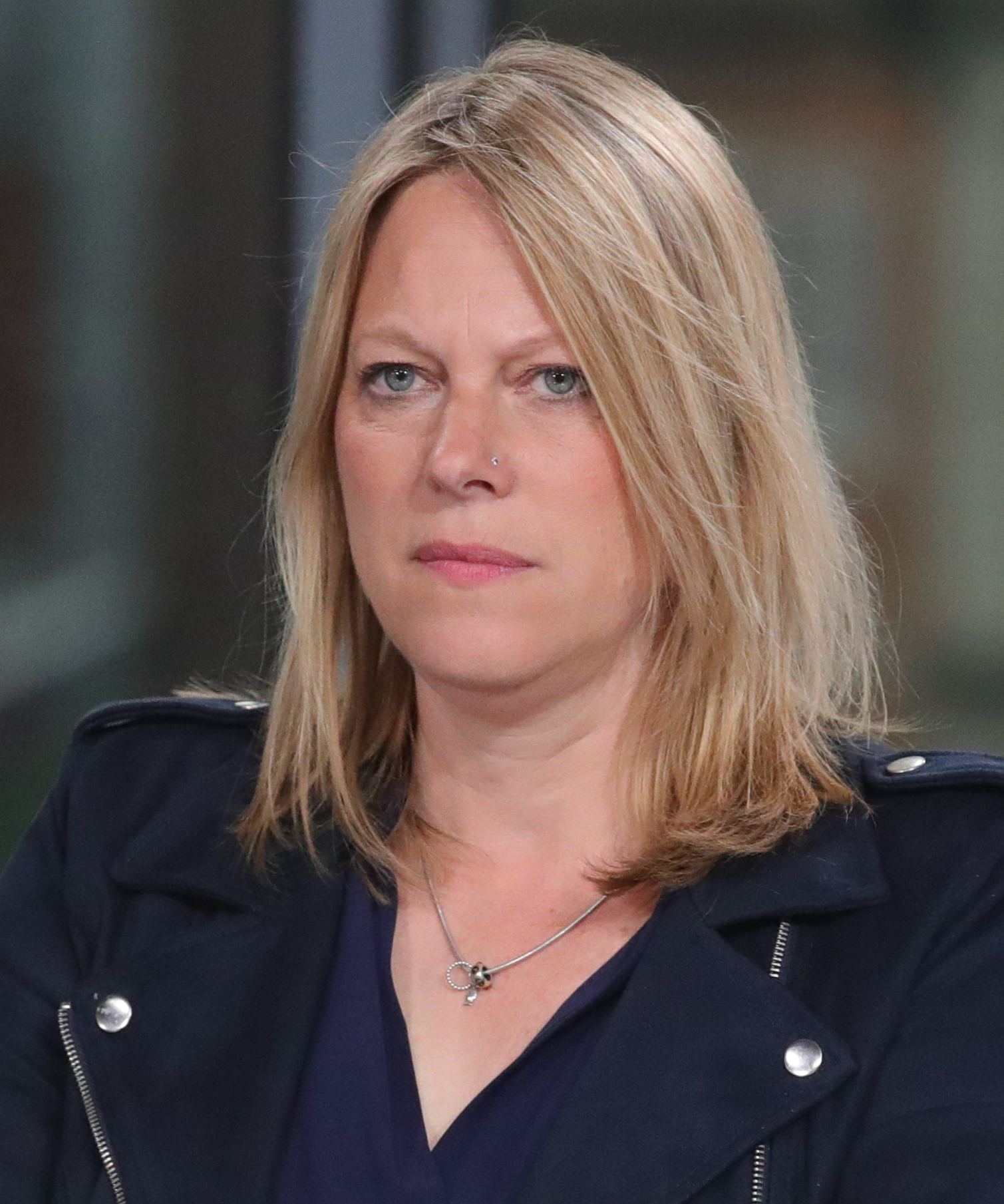

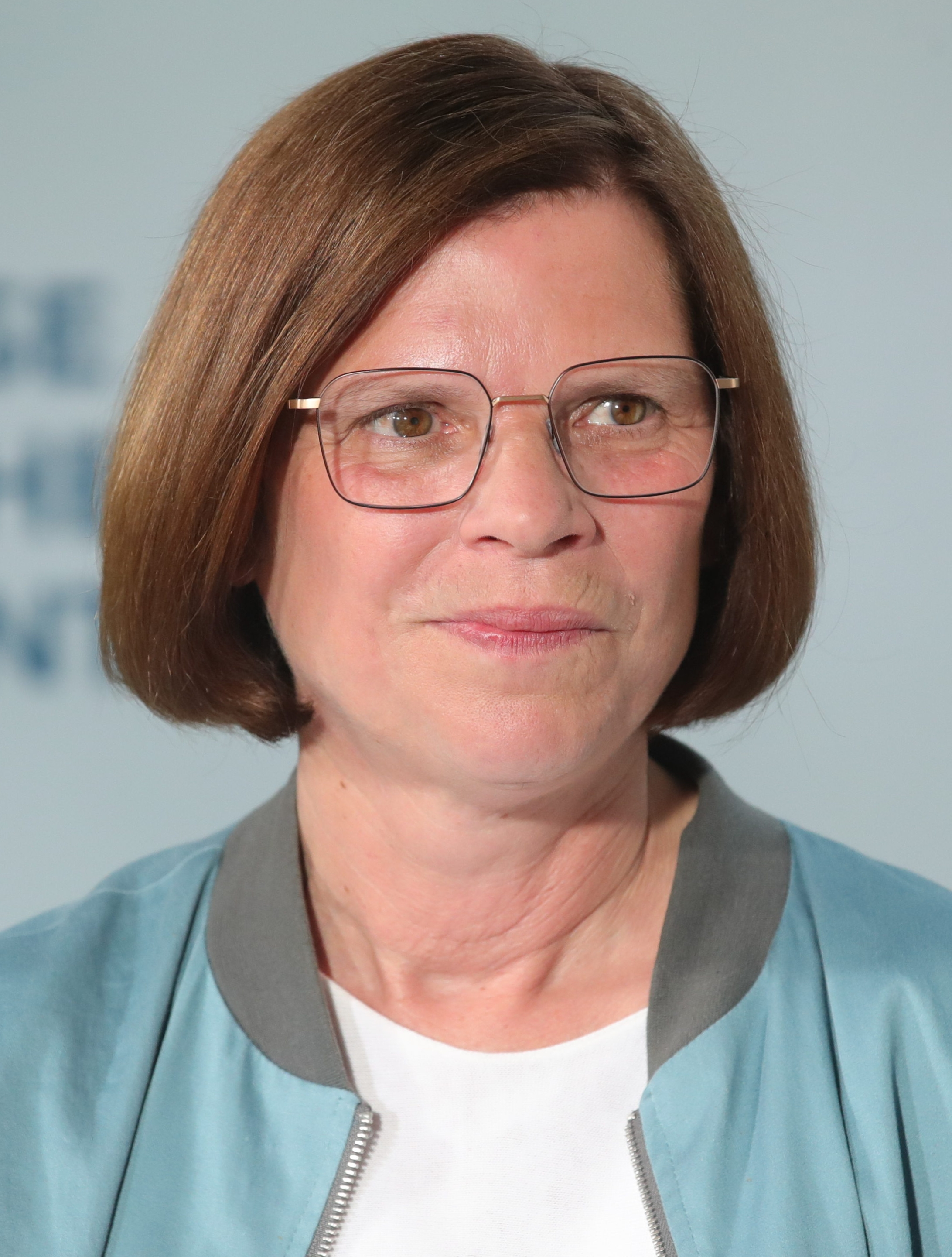

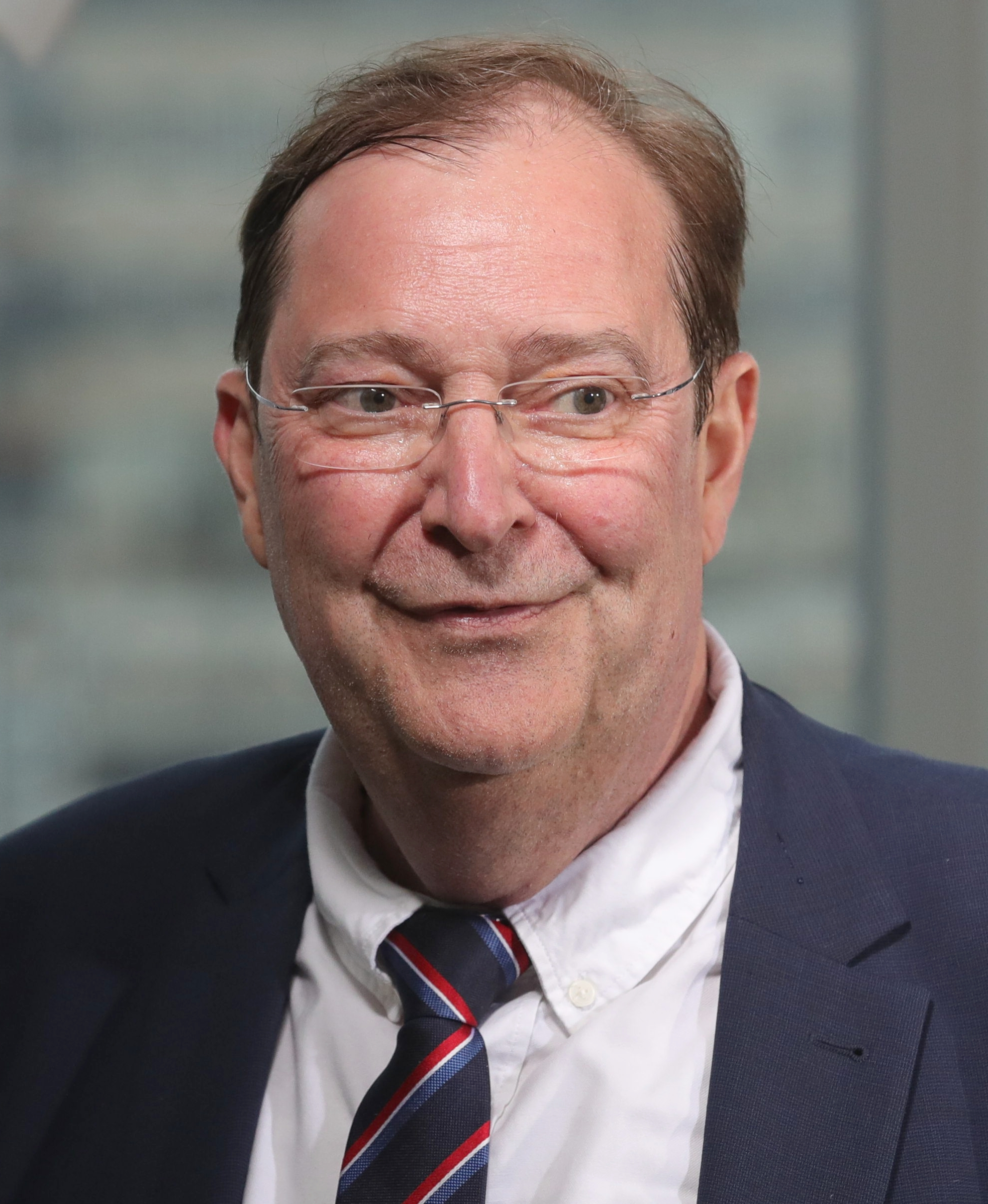

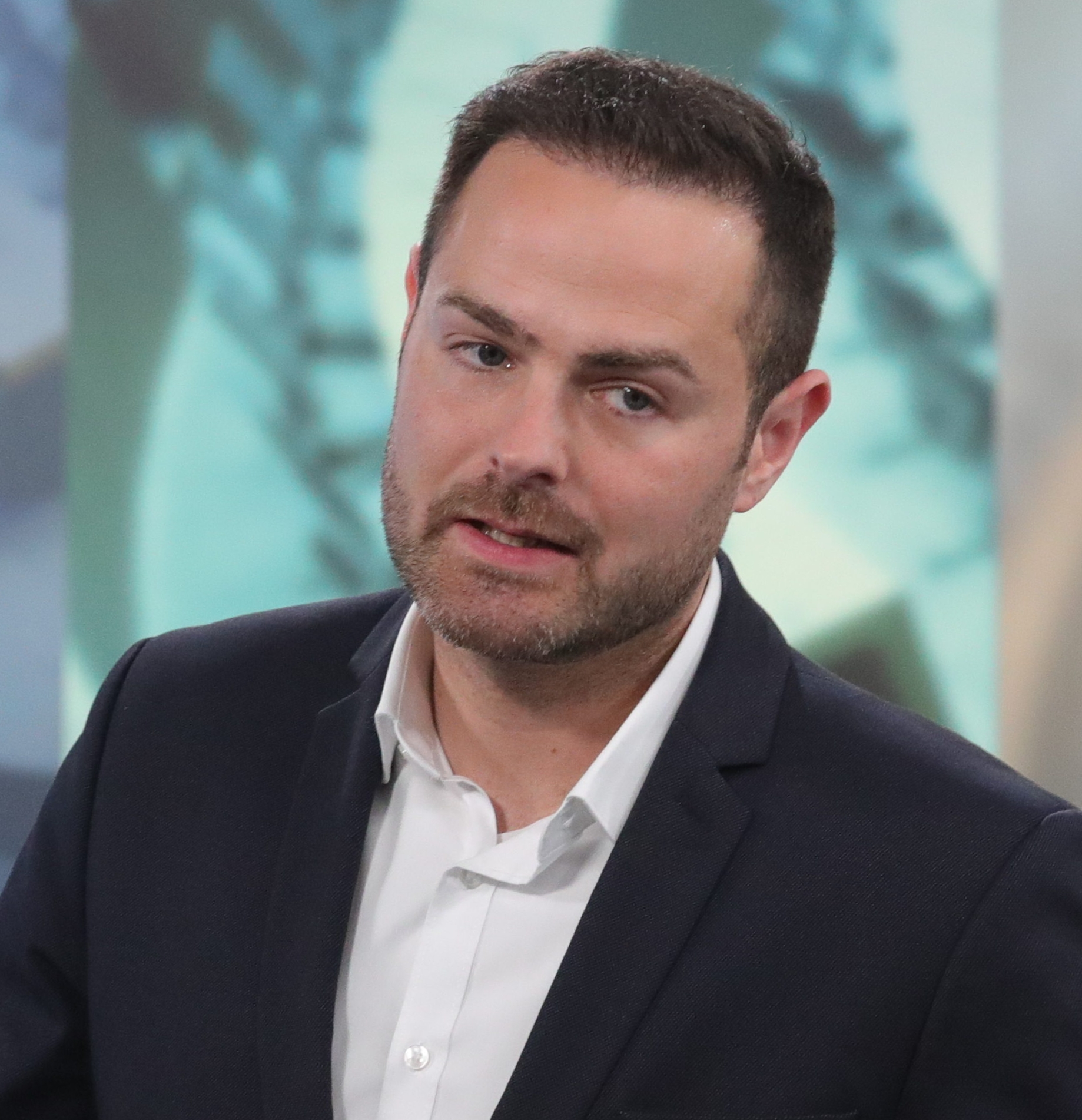
| | First party | Second party | Third party |
|---|---|---|---|
| Candidate | Andreas Bovenschulte | Frank Imhoff | Maike Schaefer |
| Party | SPD | CDU | Greens |
| Last election | 23 seats, 24.9% | 24 seats, 26.7% | 16 seats, 17.4% |
| Seats won | 27 | 24 | 11 |
| Seat change | ▲4 | 0 | ▼5 |
| Popular vote | 376,610 | 331,380 | 150,263 |
| Percentage | 29.8% | 26.2% | 11.9% |
| Swing | ▲4.9pp | ▼0.4pp | ▼5.5pp |
| | Fourth party | Fifth party | Sixth party |
| Candidate | Kristina Vogt | Piet Leidreiter | Thore Schäck |
| Party | Left | BIW | FDP |
| Last election | 10 seats, 11.3% | 1 seat, 2.4% | 5 seats, 5.9% |
| Seats won | 10 | 10 | 5 |
| Seat change | 0 | ▲9 | 0 |
| Popular vote | 137,676 | 118,695 | 64,155 |
| Percentage | 10.9% | 9.4% | 5.1% |
| Swing | ▼0.4pp | ▲7.0pp | ▼0.9pp |
- Results by polling precinct. Note: the results in the precincts coloured white have not been added to the map.
Government before election
First Bovenschulte senate
SPD–Green–Left
Government after election
Second Bovenschulte senate
SPD–Green–Left

The 2023 Bremen state election was held on 14 May 2023 to elect the 21st Bürgerschaft of Bremen. Elections to the city councils of Bremen and Bremerhaven, the two municipal entities comprising the state of Bremen, were held simultaneously. The incumbent government was a coalition of the Social Democratic Party (SPD), Alliance 90/The Greens, and The Left led by Mayor Andreas Bovenschulte.

With 30% of the vote, the SPD emerged as the largest party on a modest swing. The opposition Christian Democratic Union (CDU) remained steady on 26% but fell to second place. The Greens suffered a significant decline to 12%, while The Left repeated its 2019 performance of 11%. The right-wing Citizens in Rage (BiW) achieved their best-ever result with 9.4%, benefitting from the absence of the Alternative for Germany (AfD), who were disqualified from running due to internal party disputes. The Free Democratic Party (FDP) narrowly retained their seats with 5.1%.

On 25 June, the incumbent governing coalition announced that they would renew their cooperation, forming the Second Bovenschulte senate.

== Election date and electoral system ==
According to Bremen state constitution, the Bürgerschaft has a term of four years, and elections must take place on a Sunday or public holiday during the last month of the previous term. Bremen is the only German state whose parliament sits for a four-year term; all others have terms of five years. The previous election took place on 26 May 2019, and the date for the 2023 election was set for 14 May.

The Bürgerschaft is elected via open party-list proportional representation in two multi-member constituencies corresponding to the two parts of the state: the city of Bremen and the city of Bremerhaven. A five percent electoral threshold is applied independently in both areas. 72 members are elected in Bremen and 15 in Bremerhaven, for a total of 87 seats in the Bürgerschaft. Seat distribution is calculated using the Sainte-Laguë method. Voters each have five votes which may be distributed between party lists and the candidates within them; voters may cast multiple votes for a single candidate or list (panachage with cumulative voting). In Bremen (but not Bremerhaven), the same ballot is also used to elect the city council, also consisting of 72 members elected from the same pool of parties and candidates.

All German citizens aged 16 years or older who have lived in Bremen for at least three months are eligible to vote. Additionally, EU citizens residing in the city of Bremen and meeting the same requirements may vote, but their votes only count toward the Bremen city council election, not the state Bürgerschaft. Due to this, results for the Bremen city council may vary slightly from the state election results.

== Background ==
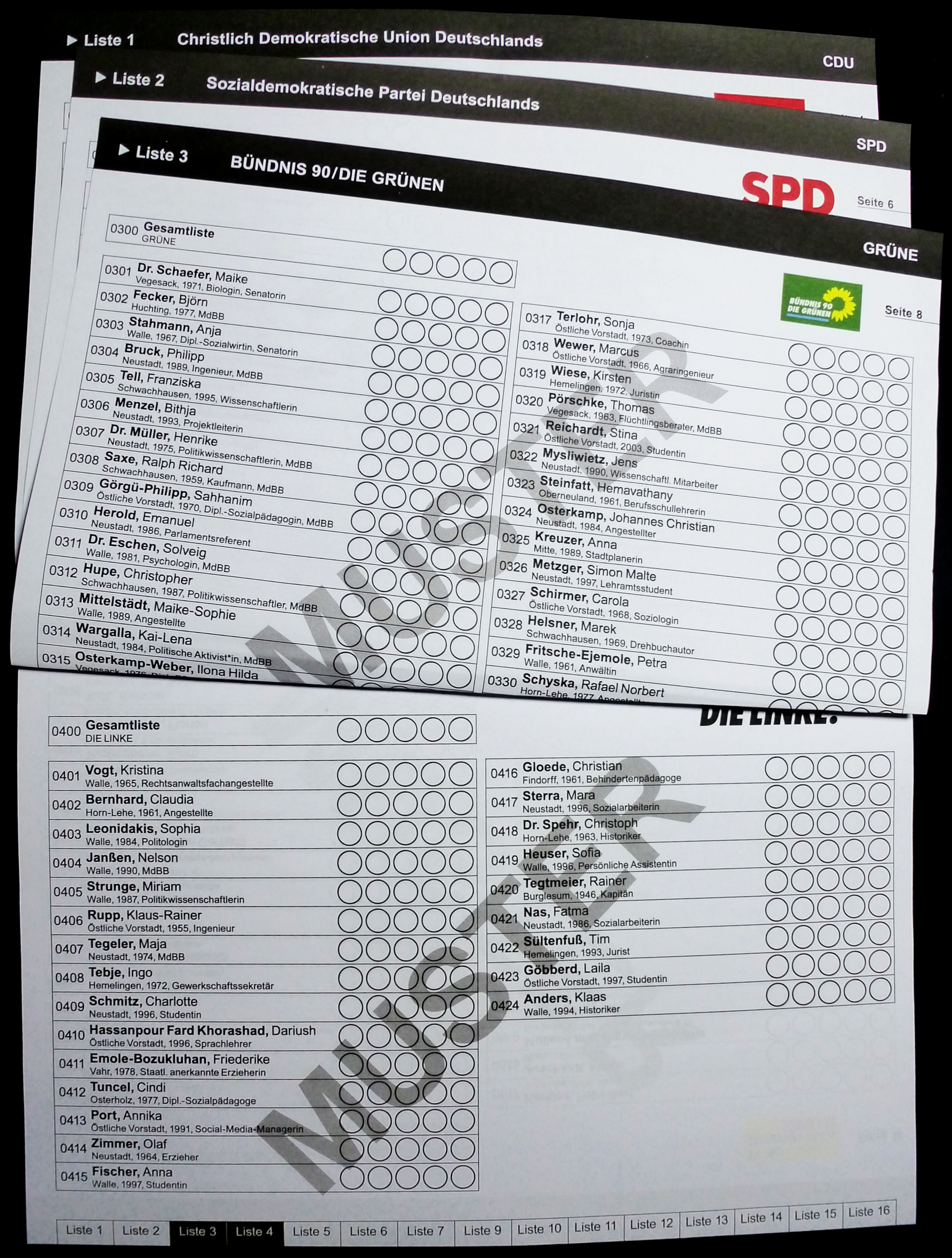
Ballot paper in Bremen.

In the previous election held on 26 May 2019, the CDU became the largest party in the Bürgerschaft for the first time in post-war history, winning 26.7%. The SPD, which has governed the state continuously since the Second World War, was reduced to second place on 24.9%, a record low for the party and down eight percentage points from the 2015 election. The Greens and Left both improved modestly, taking 17% and 11% respectively, while the AfD and FDP won 6% each with slight losses. Citizens in Rage (BiW) retained its single seat in Bremerhaven.

The previous governing coalition of the SPD and Greens lost its majority in the election. Despite the CDU achieving a plurality, the Bürgerschaft retained an overall left-wing majority of the SPD, Greens, and Left. The three parties subsequently formed a coalition government under new mayor Andreas Bovenschulte, marking the first time The Left had entered government in a western state.

== Parties ==
The table below lists parties represented in the previous Bürgerschaft of Bremen.

| Name | | Ideology | Lead candidate | 2019 result | |
| Name | | Ideology | Lead candidate | Votes (%) | Seats |
|---|---|---|---|---|---|
| CDU | Christian Democratic Union of Germany; Christlich Demokratische Union Deutschlands | Christian democracy | Frank Imhoff | 26.7% | 24 / 84 |
| SPD | Social Democratic Party of Germany; Sozialdemokratische Partei Deutschlands | Social democracy | Andreas Bovenschulte | 24.9% | 23 / 84 |
| Grüne | Alliance 90/The Greens; Bündnis 90/Die Grünen | Green politics | Maike Schaefer | 15.1% | 16 / 84 |
| Linke | The Left; Die Linke | Democratic socialism | Kristina Vogt | 11.3% | 10 / 84 |
| AfD | Alternative for Germany; Alternative für Deutschland | Right-wing populism | | 6.1% | 5 / 84 |
| FDP | Free Democratic Party; Freie Demokratische Partei | Classical liberalism | Thore Schäck | 5.9% | 5 / 84 |
| BIW | Citizens in Rage; Bürger in Wut | Right-wing populism | Piet Leidreiter | 3.2% | 1 / 84 |

In March 2023, the state electoral committee disqualified the Alternative for Germany from running in the election due to the attempts of two different groups of party officials, both claiming to be the legitimate party executive, submitting competing lists.

Besides parties represented in the outgoing Bürgerschaft, ten parties ran in the election:

- Grassroots Democratic Party of Germany (dieBasis)
- Basic Income for All (GFA)
- Marxist–Leninist Party of Germany (MLPD)
- MERA25
- Ecological Democratic Party (ÖDP)
- Die PARTEI
- Human Environment Animal Protection Party (Tierschutzpartei)
- Pirate Party Germany
- Volt Bremen
- Party for Biomedical Rejuvenation Research

Of these, all except the ÖDP and Pirate Party ran lists in Bremen only. The ÖDP ran lists in both Bremen and Bremerhaven, while the Pirate Party ran only in Bremerhaven.

== Opinion polling ==
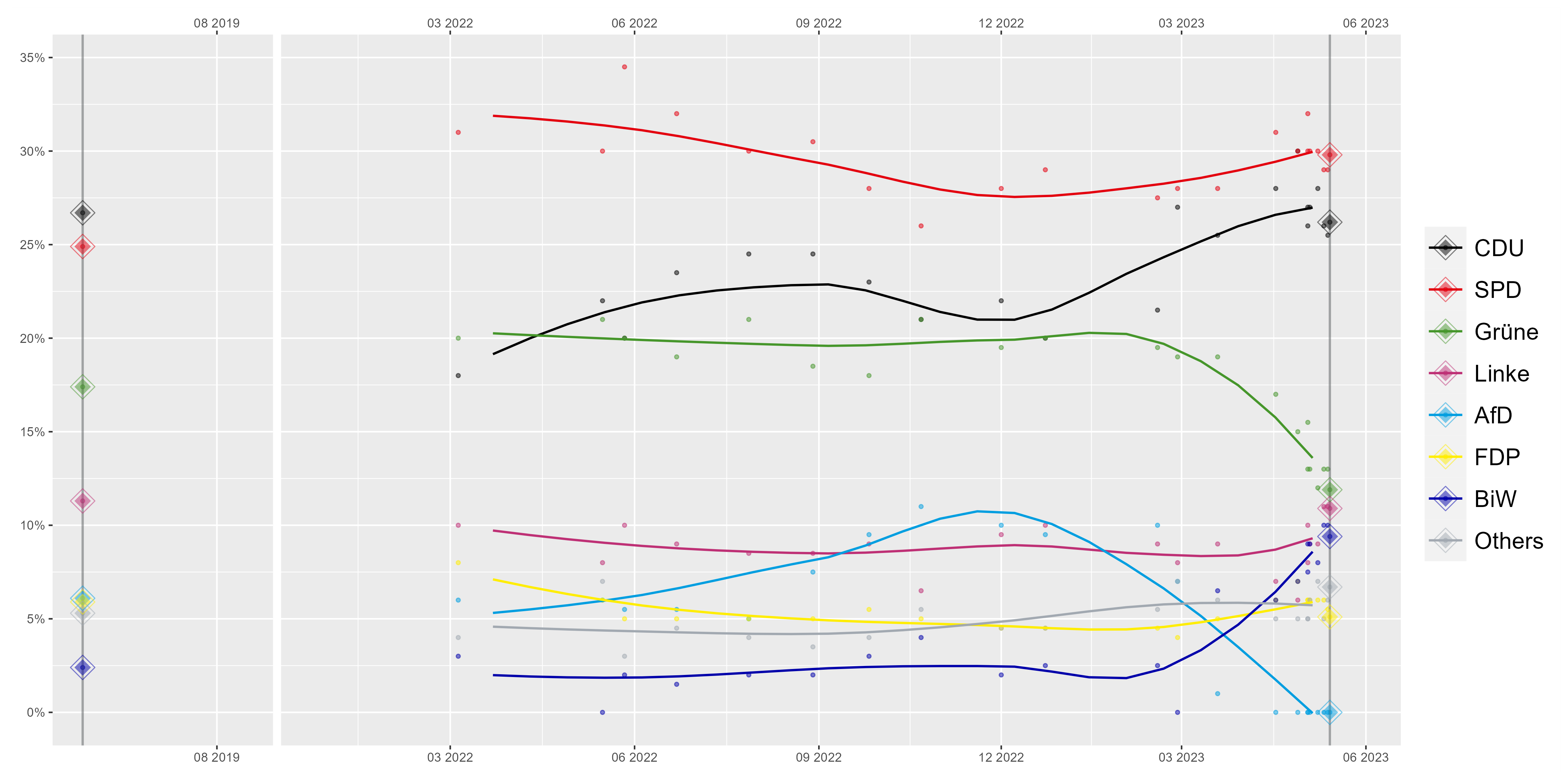
LOESS curve of the polling for the 2023 Bremen State Election (Note there is a break in the axis between the first poll and the previous election result).

=== Party polling ===
| Polling firm | Fieldwork date | Sample size | CDU | SPD | Grüne | Linke | AfD | FDP | BiW | Others | Lead |
|---|---|---|---|---|---|---|---|---|---|---|---|
| 2023 state election | 14 May 2023 | – | 26.2 | 29.8 | 11.9 | 10.9 | – | 5.1 | 9.4 | 6.7 | 3.6 |
| Wahlkreisprognose | 8–13 May 2023 | 700 | 25.5 | 29 | 13 | 11 | – | 5.5 | 10 | 6 | 3.5 |
| Forschungsgruppe Wahlen | 10–11 May 2023 | 1,088 | 26 | 29 | 13 | 11 | – | 6 | 10 | 5 | 3 |
| INSA | 2–8 May 2023 | 1,000 | 28 | 30 | 12 | 9 | – | 6 | 8 | 7 | 2 |
| Forschungsgruppe Wahlen | 27 Apr–4 May 2023 | 1,024 | 27 | 30 | 13 | 9 | – | 6 | 9 | 6 | 3 |
| Infratest dimap | 1–3 May 2023 | 1,450 | 27 | 30 | 13 | 10 | – | 6 | 9 | 5 | 3 |
| Wahlkreisprognose | 29 Apr–3 May 2023 | 727 | 26 | 32 | 15.5 | 8 | – | 6 | 7.5 | 5 | 6 |
| INSA | 21–28 Apr 2023 | 500 | 30 | 30 | 15 | 6 | – | 7 | 7 | 5 | Tie |
| Infratest dimap | 13–17 Apr 2023 | 1,155 | 28 | 31 | 17 | 7 | – | 6 | 6 | 5 | 3 |
| | 23 Mar 2023 | AfD list for Bremerhaven was disqualified | | | | | | | | | |
| Wahlkreisprognose | 17–19 Mar 2023 | 900 | 25.5 | 28 | 19 | 9 | 1 | 5 | 6.5 | 6 | 2.5 |
| | 17 Mar 2023 | Both AfD lists in Bremen (electoral district) were disqualified | | | | | | | | | |
| Infratest dimap | 22–27 Feb 2023 | 1,179 | 27 | 28 | 19 | 8 | 7 | 4 | – | 7 | 1 |
| Wahlkreisprognose | 13–17 Feb 2023 | 832 | 21.5 | 27.5 | 19.5 | 9 | 10 | 4.5 | 2.5 | 5.5 | 6 |
| Wahlkreisprognose | 19–23 Dec 2022 | 967 | 20 | 29 | 20 | 10 | 9.5 | 4.5 | 2.5 | 4.5 | 9 |
| Wahlkreisprognose | 28 Nov–1 Dec 2022 | 1,200 | 22 | 28 | 19.5 | 9.5 | 10 | 4.5 | 2 | 4.5 | 6 |
| Wahlkreisprognose | 13–22 Oct 2022 | 989 | 21 | 26 | 21 | 6.5 | 11 | 5 | 4 | 5.5 | 5 |
| Wahlkreisprognose | 18–26 Sep 2022 | 1,010 | 23 | 28 | 18 | 9 | 9.5 | 5.5 | 3 | 4 | 5 |
| Wahlkreisprognose | 19–29 Aug 2022 | 1,014 | 24.5 | 30.5 | 18.5 | 8.5 | 7.5 | 5 | 2 | 3.5 | 6 |
| Wahlkreisprognose | 19–28 Jul 2022 | 1,009 | 24.5 | 30 | 21 | 8.5 | 5 | 5 | 2 | 4 | 5.5 |
| Wahlkreisprognose | 12–22 Jun 2022 | 1,423 | 23.5 | 32 | 19 | 9 | 5.5 | 5 | 1.5 | 4.5 | 8.5 |
| Wahlkreisprognose | 21–27 May 2022 | 1,104 | 20 | 34.5 | 20 | 10 | 5.5 | 5 | 2 | 3 | 14.5 |
| Infratest dimap | 11–16 May 2022 | 1,145 | 22 | 30 | 21 | 8 | 6 | 6 | – | 7 | 8 |
| Wahlkreisprognose | 24 Feb – 5 Mar 2022 | 1,200 | 18 | 31 | 20 | 10 | 6 | 8 | 3 | 4 | 11 |
| 2021 federal election | 26 Sep 2021 | – | 17.2 | 31.5 | 20.9 | 7.7 | 6.9 | 9.3 | – | 6.6 | 10.6 |
| 2019 state election | 26 May 2019 | – | 26.7 | 24.9 | 17.4 | 11.3 | 6.1 | 5.9 | 2.4 | 5.3 | 1.8 |

=== Mayor polling ===
| Polling firm | Fieldwork date | Sample size | | | | | | None/ Unsure | Lead |
| Polling firm | Fieldwork date | Sample size | Imhoff CDU | Meyer-Heder CDU | Bovenschulte SPD | Schaefer Grüne | Vogt Linke | None/ Unsure | Lead |
|---|---|---|---|---|---|---|---|---|---|
| Wahlkreisprognose | 8–13 May 2023 | 700 | 28 | – | 61 | – | – | 11 | 33 |
| Forschungsgruppe Wahlen | 10–11 May 2023 | 1,088 | 23 | – | 60 | – | – | 17 | 37 |
| Forschungsgruppe Wahlen | 27 Apr–4 May 2023 | 1,024 | 24 | – | 58 | – | – | 18 | 34 |
| Infratest dimap | 1–3 May 2023 | 1,450 | 23 | – | 59 | – | – | 18 | 36 |
| Wahlkreisprognose | 29 Apr–3 May 2023 | 727 | 26 | – | 49 | 8 | 10 | 7 | 23 |
| Infratest dimap | 13–17 Apr 2023 | 1,155 | 17 | – | 52 | 5 | – | 26 | 35 |
| Wahlkreisprognose | 17–19 Mar 2023 | 900 | 27 | – | 45 | 9 | 14 | 5 | 18 |
| Wahlkreisprognose | 13–17 Feb 2023 | 832 | 21 | – | 45 | 10 | 9 | 15 | 24 |
| Wahlkreisprognose | 19–23 Dec 2022 | 967 | 20 | – | 47 | 7 | 12 | 14 | 27 |
| Wahlkreisprognose | 28 Nov–1 Dec 2022 | 1,200 | 21 | – | 46 | 7 | 9 | 17 | 25 |
| Wahlkreisprognose | 13–22 Oct 2022 | 989 | 25 | – | 54 | 7 | 5 | 9 | 29 |
| Wahlkreisprognose | 18–26 Sep 2022 | 1,010 | 27 | – | 54 | 3 | 5 | 11 | 27 |
| Wahlkreisprognose | 19–29 Aug 2022 | 1,014 | 28 | – | 58 | 3 | 3 | 8 | 30 |
| Wahlkreisprognose | 19–28 Jul 2022 | 1,009 | 27 | – | 59 | 3 | 4 | 7 | 32 |
| Wahlkreisprognose | 12–22 Jun 2022 | 1,423 | 26 | – | 54 | 7 | 6 | 7 | 28 |
| Wahlkreisprognose | 21–27 May 2022 | 1,104 | 18 | – | 65 | 3 | 5 | 9 | 47 |
| Wahlkreisprognose | 24 Feb – 5 Mar 2022 | 1,200 | – | 12 | 64 | 6 | 8 | – | 52 |

== Results ==
| Party | Votes | % | Swing | Seats | | Total seats | Change |
| Party | Votes | % | Swing | Bremen | Bremerhaven | Total seats | Change |
|---|---|---|---|---|---|---|---|
| Social Democratic Party (SPD) | 376,610 | 29.8 | ▲4.9 | 23 | 4 | 27 | ▲4 |
| Christian Democratic Union (CDU) | 331,380 | 26.2 | ▼0.4 | 21 | 3 | 24 | 0 |
| Alliance 90/The Greens (GRÜNE) | 150,263 | 11.9 | ▼5.5 | 9 | 2 | 11 | ▼5 |
| The Left (DIE LINKE) | 137,676 | 10.9 | ▼0.4 | 9 | 1 | 10 | 0 |
| Citizens in Rage (BiW) | 118,695 | 9.4 | ▲7.0 | 6 | 4 | 10 | ▲9 |
| Free Democratic Party (FDP) | 64,155 | 5.1 | ▼0.9 | 4 | 1 | 5 | 0 |
| Volt Germany (Volt) | 24,828 | 2.0 | New | 0 | – | 0 | New |
| Human Environment Animal Protection Party | 13,819 | 1.1 | New | 0 | – | 0 | New |
| Die PARTEI | 12,052 | 1.0 | ▼0.7 | 0 | – | 0 | 0 |
| Grassroots Democratic Party (dieBasis) | 9,988 | 0.8 | New | 0 | – | 0 | New |
| MERA25 | 7,912 | 0.6 | New | 0 | – | 0 | New |
| Ecological Democratic Party (ÖDP) | 5,498 | 0.4 | New | 0 | 0 | 0 | New |
| Basic Income for All (GFA) | 5,351 | 0.4 | New | 0 | – | 0 | New |
| Pirate Party Germany (Piraten) | 2,184 | 0.2 | ▼0.8 | – | 0 | 0 | 0 |
| Marxist–Leninist Party of Germany (MLPD) | 1,993 | 0.2 | New | 0 | – | 0 | New |
| Party for Biomedical Rejuvenation Research | 1,484 | 0.1 | New | 0 | – | 0 | New |
| Total | 1,263,908 | 100.0 | | 72 | 15 | 87 | ▲3 |
| Invalid | 6,698 | 2.6 | ▲0.3 | | | | |
| Turnout | 262,099 | 56.9 | ▼7.2 | | | | |
| Registered voters | 460,778 | | | | | | |
Source: Wahlen Bremen

=== Bremen ===
| Area | Eligible voters | Voter turnout | SPD | CDU | Grüne | Linke | BIW | FDP | Volt | Other |
|---|---|---|---|---|---|---|---|---|---|---|
| City of Bremen | 381.397 | 59,5 % | 29,9 % | 26,9 % | 11,7 % | 11,6 % | 7,4 % | 5,1 % | 2,3 % | 5,1 % |
| Altstadt | 2.480 | 58,8 % | 23,4 % | 26,7 % | 16,1 % | 11,4 % | 4,4 % | 8,5 % | 3,0 % | 6,4 % |
| Bahnhofsvorstadt | 3.249 | 50,2 % | 25,7 % | 22,0 % | 16,3 % | 12,9 % | 5,0 % | 6,1 % | 3,3 % | 8,3 % |
| Ostertor | 6.289 | 72,8 % | 24,8 % | 13,8 % | 21,0 % | 24,8 % | 1,8 % | 3,5 % | 2,9 % | 7,6 % |
| Alte Neustadt | 5.153 | 63,2 % | 25,9 % | 20,6 % | 16,9 % | 16,0 % | 4,4 % | 5,6 % | 3,3 % | 7,3 % |
| Hohentor | 3.081 | 58,9 % | 24,0 % | 12,9 % | 20,1 % | 22,0 % | 4,3 % | 3,5 % | 3,3 % | 10,0 % |
| Neustadt | 5.433 | 71,1 % | 26,3 % | 13,3 % | 20,1 % | 23,7 % | 2,2 % | 2,8 % | 3,1 % | 8,3 % |
| Südervorstadt | 3.597 | 66,6 % | 26,7 % | 13,7 % | 20,4 % | 20,4 % | 3,5 % | 3,3 % | 3,5 % | 8,5 % |
| Gartenstadt Süd | 3.410 | 59,5 % | 32,6 % | 19,9 % | 13,5 % | 13,9 % | 6,2 % | 4,2 % | 2,8 % | 6,8 % |
| Buntentor | 5.179 | 71,3 % | 26,0 % | 14,2 % | 21,1 % | 21,6 % | 2,8 % | 3,2 % | 3,6 % | 7,5 % |
| Neuenland | 792 | 55,8 % | 30,3 % | 29,1 % | 11,1 % | 9,7 % | 6,3 % | 4,9 % | 3,8 % | 4,6 % |
| Huckelriede | 4.915 | 64,2 % | 29,5 % | 17,9 % | 16,9 % | 16,3 % | 4,6 % | 4,4 % | 3,0 % | 7,3 % |
| Habenhausen | 6.536 | 76,1 % | 32,1 % | 37,8 % | 6,4 % | 6,1 % | 6,8 % | 5,9 % | 1,6 % | 3,2 % |
| Arsten | 7.286 | 63,3 % | 33,5 % | 35,6 % | 5,7 % | 6,2 % | 8,4 % | 5,7 % | 0,8 % | 4,1 % |
| Kattenturm | 7.547 | 45,0 % | 37,5 % | 27,2 % | 5,3 % | 7,9 % | 10,6 % | 5,0 % | 1,3 % | 5,1 % |
| Kattenesch | 3.881 | 57,7 % | 35,6 % | 29,4 % | 7,3 % | 6,7 % | 10,6 % | 5,2 % | 0,9 % | 4,3 % |
| Mittelshuchting | 6.553 | 50,1 % | 33,8 % | 30,7 % | 6,4 % | 7,1 % | 10,8 % | 4,6 % | 1,9 % | 4,8 % |
| Sodenmatt | 4.209 | 39,6 % | 37,0 % | 28,9 % | 4,5 % | 7,1 % | 13,3 % | 3,8 % | 0,9 % | 4,3 % |
| Kirchhuchting | 5.075 | 45,6 % | 34,7 % | 30,9 % | 5,8 % | 6,7 % | 11,6 % | 4,3 % | 1,2 % | 4,9 % |
| Grolland | 2.546 | 73,4 % | 33,5 % | 28,3 % | 10,3 % | 8,9 % | 9,5 % | 4,3 % | 1,7 % | 3,4 % |
| Woltmershausen | 7.012 | 52,0 % | 33,5 % | 24,8 % | 9,2 % | 9,3 % | 10,0 % | 3,6 % | 2,8 % | 6,9 % |
| Rablinghausen | 2.365 | 62,6 % | 36,8 % | 29,4 % | 9,0 % | 7,4 % | 8,6 % | 2,9 % | 1,2 % | 4,7 % |
| Seehausen | 796 | 63,4 % | 20,9 % | 58,0 % | 2,5 % | 2,8 % | 8,5 % | 3,1 % | 0,7 % | 3,5 % |
| Strom | 342 | 74,0 % | 17,7 % | 60,6 % | 5,4 % | 4,4 % | 3,5 % | 4,0 % | 0,3 % | 4,0 % |
| Steintor | 5.513 | 73,6 % | 23,2 % | 10,5 % | 22,3 % | 28,2 % | 2,0 % | 2,6 % | 3,5 % | 7,8 % |
| Fesenfeld | 5.298 | 73,5 % | 25,3 % | 11,9 % | 22,0 % | 26,2 % | 1,5 % | 2,9 % | 3,9 % | 6,3 % |
| Peterswerder | 7.830 | 74,9 % | 28,2 % | 16,3 % | 18,3 % | 21,7 % | 3,1 % | 3,3 % | 3,3 % | 5,8 % |
| Hulsberg | 3.622 | 67,4 % | 29,1 % | 17,0 % | 16,5 % | 19,6 % | 4,6 % | 3,4 % | 3,1 % | 6,9 % |
| Neu-Schwachhausen | 4.733 | 75,1 % | 25,1 % | 30,0 % | 17,4 % | 9,5 % | 3,6 % | 6,3 % | 3,9 % | 4,1 % |
| Bürgerpark | 3.479 | 76,9 % | 21,2 % | 34,1 % | 15,8 % | 11,6 % | 8,6 % | 2,5 % | 3,1 % | 3,1 % |
| Barkhof | 2.340 | 74,9 % | 25,0 % | 23,1 % | 20,3 % | 15,1 % | 2,1 % | 5,8 % | 4,1 % | 4,5 % |
| Riensberg | 4.748 | 72,5 % | 26,3 % | 27,6 % | 18,2 % | 10,3 % | 3,7 % | 6,0 % | 3,0 % | 4,8 % |
| Radio Bremen | 5.686 | 74,0 % | 23,2 % | 35,4 % | 14,8 % | 9,6 % | 2,9 % | 7,3 % | 3,2 % | 3,6 % |
| Schwachhausen | 2.724 | 80,6 % | 23,3 % | 29,6 % | 17,7 % | 13,2 % | 2,6 % | 6,0 % | 3,5 % | 3,9 % |
| Gete | 6.315 | 77,1 % | 24,8 % | 27,5 % | 17,4 % | 14,4 % | 3,0 % | 5,6 % | 3,4 % | 3,8 % |
| Gartenstadt Vahr | 5.414 | 58,5 % | 31,0 % | 29,2 % | 8,8 % | 10,1 % | 8,0 % | 5,7 % | 2,1 % | 5,0 % |
| Neue Vahr Nord | 4.443 | 37,8 % | 36,5 % | 21,9 % | 7,6 % | 7,3 % | 12,1 % | 5,8 % | 2,3 % | 6,5 % |
| Neue Vahr Südwest | 2.634 | 41,8 % | 42,6 % | 23,6 % | 5,0 % | 9,1 % | 10,1 % | 3,9 % | 1,5 % | 4,2 % |
| Neue Vahr Südost | 4.273 | 38,7 % | 39,4 % | 23,3 % | 5,6 % | 6,2 % | 13,3 % | 3,7 % | 2,4 % | 6,2 % |
| Horn | 3.893 | 72,0 % | 23,0 % | 41,0 % | 11,1 % | 7,4 % | 4,9 % | 7,8 % | 2,3 % | 2,6 % |
| Lehe | 6.471 | 68,0 % | 26,9 % | 25,9 % | 16,8 % | 11,3 % | 4,0 % | 6,3 % | 3,7 % | 5,0 % |
| Lehesterdeich | 8.781 | 67,7 % | 29,7 % | 29,5 % | 12,5 % | 8,3 % | 6,2 % | 6,8 % | 2,6 % | 4,5 % |
| Borgfeld | 6.988 | 80,7 % | 23,5 % | 41,9 % | 12,0 % | 5,9 % | 5,3 % | 6,5 % | 2,0 % | 2,7 % |
| Oberneuland | 10.488 | 73,5 % | 19,7 % | 50,0 % | 7,0 % | 4,3 % | 4,8 % | 9,7 % | 2,1 % | 2,5 % |
| Ellener Feld | 2.501 | 55,0 % | 34,0 % | 30,9 % | 7,3 % | 7,9 % | 10,3 % | 4,8 % | 1,3 % | 3,3 % |
| Ellenerbrok Schevemoor | 7.923 | 44,8 % | 35,3 % | 28,9 % | 5,6 % | 7,2 % | 11,6 % | 5,4 % | 1,2 % | 5,0 % |
| Tenever | 5.470 | 32,4 % | 35,8 % | 25,6 % | 4,7 % | 11,0 % | 12,0 % | 5,7 % | 0,3 % | 5,0 % |
| Osterholz | 4.373 | 59,8 % | 31,6 % | 35,0 % | 5,6 % | 6,7 % | 9,6 % | 6,1 % | 1,4 % | 4,1 % |
| Blockdiek | 3.920 | 41,2 % | 40,3 % | 26,0 % | 4,3 % | 7,3 % | 12,9 % | 4,0 % | 1,1 % | 4,2 % |
| Sebaldsbrück | 6.463 | 57,4 % | 32,3 % | 29,7 % | 8,0 % | 9,9 % | 8,8 % | 5,0 % | 1,6 % | 4,9 % |
| Hastedt | 7.287 | 63,1 % | 31,7 % | 19,0 % | 14,7 % | 15,3 % | 5,5 % | 3,8 % | 2,8 % | 7,0 % |
| Hemelingen | 6.075 | 46,7 % | 34,6 % | 28,4 % | 5,9 % | 8,6 % | 10,2 % | 4,5 % | 1,9 % | 5,9 % |
| Arbergen | 4.399 | 64,4 % | 32,7 % | 36,4 % | 3,6 % | 7,7 % | 10,5 % | 4,5 % | 0,7 % | 3,7 % |
| Mahndorf | 3.946 | 53,8 % | 34,8 % | 32,0 % | 5,4 % | 5,2 % | 12,1 % | 5,6 % | 1,0 % | 3,9 % |
| Blockland | 337 | 84,0 % | 19,5 % | 47,7 % | 8,4 % | 8,2 % | 5,9 % | 4,1 % | 0,9 % | 5,2 % |
| Regensburger Straße | 4.936 | 67,5 % | 28,0 % | 16,6 % | 19,0 % | 16,9 % | 4,3 % | 3,9 % | 4,1 % | 7,4 % |
| Findorff-Bürgerweide | 4.692 | 64,8 % | 30,4 % | 16,0 % | 18,8 % | 17,5 % | 3,5 % | 3,8 % | 3,3 % | 6,6 % |
| Weidedamm | 9.913 | 70,3 % | 31,9 % | 24,4 % | 13,5 % | 13,4 % | 5,3 % | 4,8 % | 2,2 % | 4,7 % |
| In den Hufen | | | | | | | | | | |
| Utbremen | 1.980 | 51,5 % | 35,1 % | 20,3 % | 9,7 % | 11,5 % | 11,0 % | 5,4 % | 2,3 % | 4,8 % |
| Steffensweg | 2.860 | 52,7 % | 32,3 % | 19,9 % | 10,2 % | 13,2 % | 11,1 % | 3,7 % | 2,8 % | 7,0 % |
| Westend | 4.115 | 57,9 % | 29,7 % | 16,3 % | 15,0 % | 19,3 % | 6,8 % | 3,2 % | 3,1 % | 6,6 % |
| Walle | 5.148 | 57,8 % | 29,5 % | 19,4 % | 13,8 % | 18,1 % | 7,9 % | 3,6 % | 1,9 % | 5,6 % |
| Osterfeuerberg | 3.295 | 56,8 % | 30,2 % | 16,7 % | 12,4 % | 17,4 % | 9,8 % | 3,9 % | 2,7 % | 6,8 % |
| Hohweg | 227 | 24,2 % | 32,6 % | 20,5 % | 6,1 % | 11,7 % | 22,7 % | 3,0 % | 0,0 % | 3,5 % |
| Überseestadt | 2.986 | 54,6 % | 26,3 % | 27,4 % | 11,0 % | 8,0 % | 6,5 % | 12,5 % | 3,5 % | 4,7 % |
| Lindenhof | 3.967 | 44,5 % | 39,4 % | 21,9 % | 5,6 % | 11,0 % | 11,2 % | 4,1 % | 0,9 % | 5,9 % |
| Gröpelingen | 4.458 | 40,6 % | 38,2 % | 22,3 % | 5,9 % | 10,3 % | 12,8 % | 3,5 % | 1,2 % | 5,7 % |
| Ohlenhof | 4.292 | 38,3 % | 38,3 % | 24,9 % | 4,8 % | 9,3 % | 11,8 % | 4,1 % | 1,1 % | 5,6 % |
| Oslebshausen | 5.337 | 45,9 % | 37,5 % | 26,0 % | 4,1 % | 7,9 % | 15,1 % | 3,9 % | 0,9 % | 4,6 % |
| Burg-Grambke | 4.845 | 55,2 % | 32,4 % | 30,9 % | 6,5 % | 7,5 % | 12,3 % | 5,7 % | 1,1 % | 3,7 % |
| Werderland | 275 | 46,2 % | 32,8 % | 22,0 % | 7,2 % | 17,2 % | 7,2 % | 3,1 % | 1,3 % | 8,9 % |
| Burgdamm | 6.808 | 44,4 % | 36,7 % | 27,4 % | 5,3 % | 6,7 % | 13,2 % | 5,1 % | 1,1 % | 4,4 % |
| Lesum | 6.906 | 58,6 % | 30,8 % | 32,1 % | 9,5 % | 8,5 % | 8,2 % | 5,4 % | 1,3 % | 4,2 % |
| St. Magnus | 4.748 | 66,1 % | 28,9 % | 35,3 % | 8,5 % | 7,5 % | 8,4 % | 5,4 % | 2,6 % | 3,6 % |
| Vegesack | 4.685 | 54,4 % | 31,9 % | 31,0 % | 8,9 % | 7,7 % | 10,5 % | 4,4 % | 1,0 % | 4,5 % |
| Grohn | 3.286 | 56,2 % | 35,3 % | 30,7 % | 7,2 % | 6,7 % | 10,1 % | 4,2 % | 1,9 % | 3,8 % |
| Schönebeck | 3.894 | 63,6 % | 29,1 % | 33,9 % | 10,3 % | 7,4 % | 8,7 % | 4,2 % | 1,6 % | 4,8 % |
| Aumund-Hammersbeck | 5.407 | 56,0 % | 35,1 % | 27,6 % | 7,8 % | 6,3 % | 13,6 % | 4,2 % | 1,3 % | 4,1 % |
| Fähr-Lobbendorf | 5.409 | 50,0 % | 33,9 % | 28,4 % | 5,9 % | 7,4 % | 13,6 % | 4,6 % | 1,1 % | 5,1 % |
| Blumenthal | 5.683 | 45,5 % | 31,8 % | 30,2 % | 5,0 % | 6,6 % | 15,7 % | 5,7 % | 0,7 % | 4,2 % |
| Rönnebeck | 3.248 | 49,9 % | 36,0 % | 28,5 % | 3,5 % | 4,8 % | 17,5 % | 4,3 % | 0,6 % | 4,9 % |
| Lüssum-Bockhorn | 7.949 | 43,0 % | 34,6 % | 28,0 % | 4,8 % | 6,2 % | 17,3 % | 4,3 % | 0,6 % | 4,1 % |
| Farge | 2.140 | 54,4 % | 30,4 % | 33,2 % | 4,6 % | 4,4 % | 18,4 % | 3,4 % | 0,7 % | 4,9 % |
| Rekum | 1.824 | 60,1 % | 30,1 % | 35,0 % | 3,4 % | 4,6 % | 16,9 % | 4,1 % | 1,1 % | 4,7 % |

=== Bremerhaven results ===
| Area | Eligible voters | Voter turnout | SPD | BIW | CDU | Grüne | Linke | FDP | Piraten | ÖDP |
|---|---|---|---|---|---|---|---|---|---|---|
| City of Bremerhaven | 79.357 | 44,0 % | 29,0 % | 22,7 % | 21,3 % | 13,2 % | 6,1 % | 5,2 % | 1,3 % | 1,1 % |
| Weddewarden | 410 | 48,3 % | 21,2 % | 36,4 % | 25,5 % | 10,0 % | 3,1 % | 3,0 % | 0,1 % | 0,6 % |
| Königsheide | 4.323 | 51,4 % | 29,2 % | 24,5 % | 22,5 % | 9,9 % | 4,6 % | 7,5 % | 0,7 % | 1,0 % |
| Fehrmoor | 2.264 | 55,0 % | 27,0 % | 23,6 % | 25,6 % | 10,8 % | 5,0 % | 5,9 % | 1,3 % | 0,7 % |
| Leherheide-West | 5.266 | 26,4 % | 27,2 % | 31,6 % | 18,8 % | 6,0 % | 8,8 % | 5,7 % | 1,2 % | 0,6 % |
| Speckenbüttel | 2.599 | 68,0 % | 23,6 % | 17,3 % | 28,5 % | 17,5 % | 5,7 % | 5,7 % | 0,7 % | 1,0 % |
| Eckernfeld | 3.980 | 48,4 % | 30,4 % | 24,5 % | 19,6 % | 13,5 % | 5,3 % | 4,4 % | 1,1 % | 1,2 % |
| Twischkamp | 2.812 | 33,1 % | 34,0 % | 29,2 % | 13,3 % | 9,0 % | 8,1 % | 3,1 % | 2,4 % | 1,0 % |
| Goethestraße | 3.525 | 29,8 % | 26,5 % | 20,2 % | 15,1 % | 20,6 % | 9,3 % | 4,1 % | 2,3 % | 1,9 % |
| Klushof | 6.307 | 36,3 % | 29,6 % | 26,1 % | 17,0 % | 13,2 % | 6,8 % | 4,0 % | 2,1 % | 1,1 % |
| Schierholz | 4.550 | 48,3 % | 25,8 % | 27,2 % | 24,0 % | 11,1 % | 5,3 % | 4,5 % | 0,7 % | 1,3 % |
| Buschkämpen | 599 | 43,7 % | 27,3 % | 33,5 % | 15,1 % | 14,3 % | 4,9 % | 2,6 % | 1,4 % | 0,9 % |
| Mitte-Süd | 4.130 | 47,6 % | 31,6 % | 17,5 % | 22,8 % | 14,8 % | 5,5 % | 5,6 % | 1,4 % | 0,9 % |
| Mitte-Nord | 4.768 | 44,5 % | 28,7 % | 15,3 % | 14,0 % | 23,2 % | 10,7 % | 4,7 % | 1,7 % | 1,6 % |
| Geestemünde-Nord | 4.694 | 48,1 % | 29,0 % | 20,0 % | 22,7 % | 14,2 % | 5,8 % | 5,5 % | 1,7 % | 1,0 % |
| Geestendorf | 7.376 | 36,8 % | 31,1 % | 21,6 % | 19,4 % | 14,4 % | 6,6 % | 3,7 % | 1,7 % | 1,4 % |
| Geestemünde-Süd | 2.140 | 40,7 % | 31,9 % | 29,1 % | 16,7 % | 10,7 % | 5,0 % | 4,3 % | 1,2 % | 0,9 % |
| Bürgerpark | 3.807 | 49,6 % | 28,0 % | 15,9 % | 26,1 % | 15,5 % | 6,1 % | 6,7 % | 0,5 % | 1,1 % |
| Grünhöfe | 3.471 | 33,1 % | 27,5 % | 22,7 % | 25,9 % | 8,3 % | 8,1 % | 5,7 % | 1,2 % | 0,6 % |
| Schiffdorferdamm | 2.135 | 59,1 % | 28,3 % | 19,8 % | 24,9 % | 12,8 % | 5,5 % | 7,4 % | 0,7 % | 0,7 % |
| Surheide | 2.324 | 59,2 % | 30,9 % | 25,7 % | 19,9 % | 11,8 % | 4,2 % | 5,4 % | 1,1 % | 1,0 % |
| Dreibergen | 3.739 | 40,8 % | 30,6 % | 26,1 % | 21,7 % | 9,8 % | 4,6 % | 4,6 % | 1,6 % | 0,9 % |
| Jedutenberg | 4.138 | 56,0 % | 30,2 % | 22,9 % | 24,0 % | 10,7 % | 4,1 % | 6,3 % | 1,3 % | 0,7 % |
