= Maike Schaefer =

German politician (born 1971)

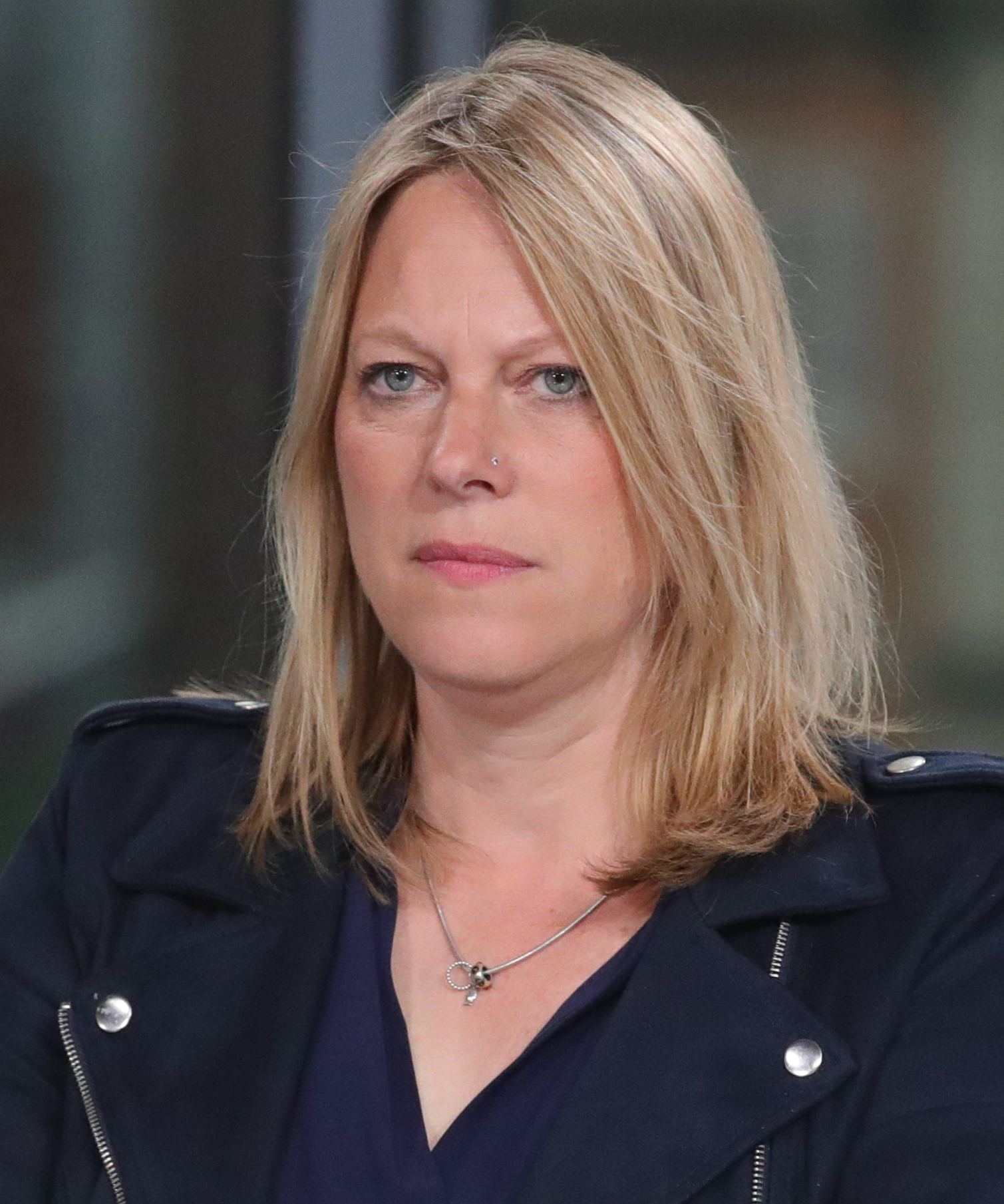
- Schaefer in 2023

Vice President of the Senate and Mayor of the Free Hanseatic City of Bremen
- In office 15 August 2019 – 5 July 2023
- Mayor: Andreas Bovenschulte
- Preceded by: Karoline Linnert
- Succeeded by: Björn Fecker

Senator for Climate Protection, Environment, Mobility, Urban Development and Housing Construction
- In office 15 August 2019 – 5 July 2023
- Mayor: Andreas Bovenschulte
- Preceded by: Joachim Lohse
- Succeeded by: Kathrin Moosdorf (Climate Protection, Environment, and Science); Özlem Ünsal (Mobility, Urban Development and Housing)

Member of the Bürgerschaft of Bremen
- In office June 2007 – 2027 (two times reelected)

Personal details
- Born: 2 June 1971 (age 55) Schwalmstadt, Hesse, West Germany (now Germany)
- Party: Alliance 90/The Greens
- Education: University of Bremen
- Occupation: Politician; Biologist

Maike Schaefer (born 2 June 1971 in Schwalmstadt) is a German biologist and politician of Alliance 90/The Greens. She served as Vice President of the Senate and Mayor of Bremen as well as Bremen Senator for Climate Protection, Environment, Mobility, Urban Development and Housing in the Bovenschulte Senate between August 2019 and July 2023.

From June 2015 to August 2019, Schaefer was the parliamentary group leader of her party in the Bremen Parliament, of which she was a member from 2007 to 2019. She was the Greens' lead candidate for the 2019 and 2023 state elections.

== Early life and education ==
Schaefer graduated from the state high school, now the Sophie Hedwig High School, in Diez in 1990. She then went to London as an au pair for a year .

After her stay in England, she studied biology at the University of Bremen and graduated in 1997. As a research assistant at the Center for Environmental Research and Sustainable Technologies (UFT) at the University of Bremen in the field of risk assessment of environmental chemicals, she received her doctorate in natural sciences as part of a soil remediation project in 2004. She remained at the UFT in the field of ecotoxicology and investigated the environmental effects of pollutants in soil and water on behalf of the institute.

== Political career ==
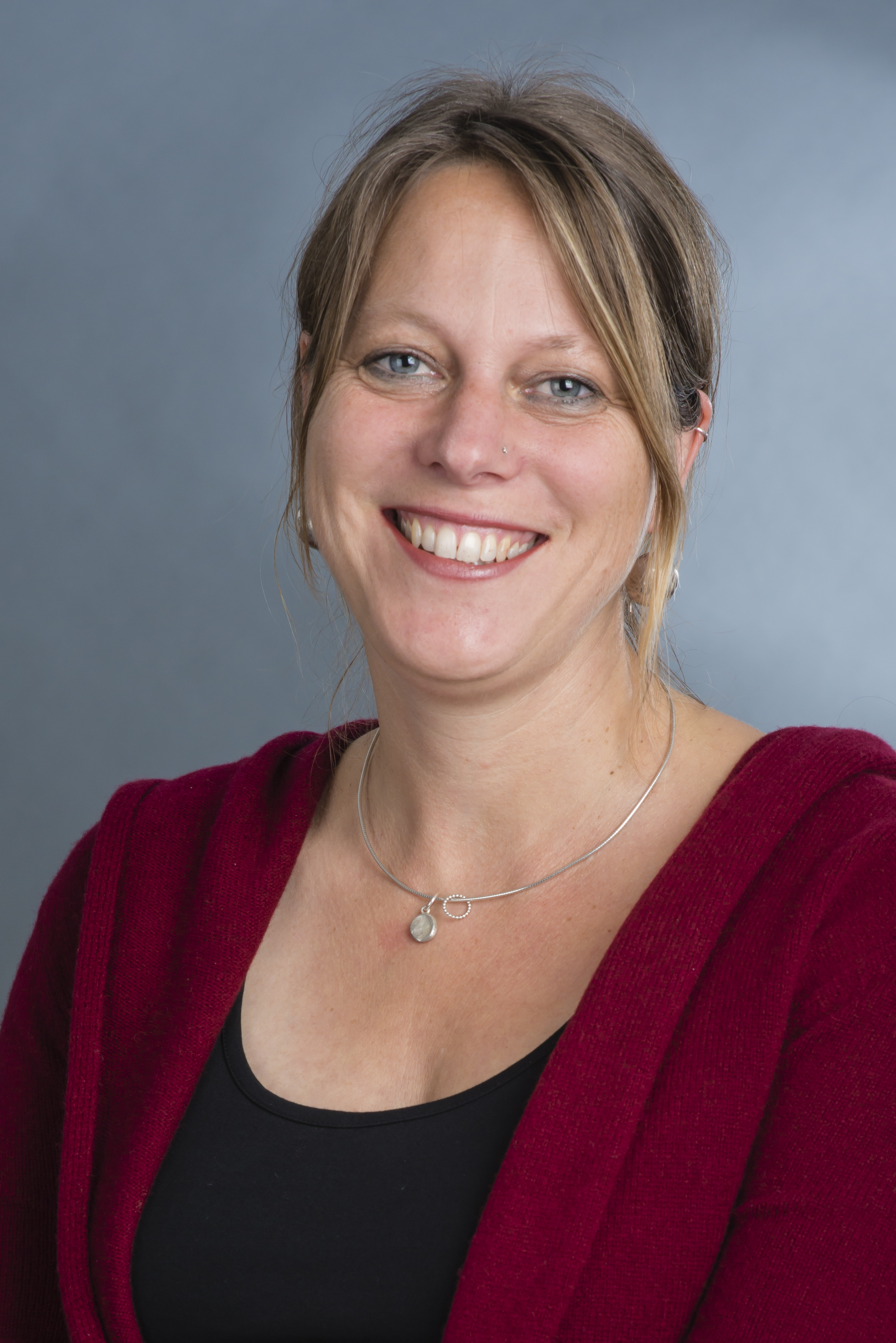
Maike Schaefer in 2015

=== Early beginnings ===
Schaefer has been a member of the Greens since January 2002. From 2003 to 2007 she was a member of the Neustadt Advisory Board.

In September 2003, Schaefer was elected as a member of the green state board, where she was responsible for the areas of environment and science. Together with Karin Mathes (MdBB) she initiated the green state working group (LAG) environment.

=== Member of the State Parliament, 2007–present ===
Schaefer has been a member of the Bürgerschaft of Bremen since June 2007 and was deputy leader of the parliamentary group from 2011 to 2015. Since the beginning of June 2015, she has led the parliamentary group as leader of the parliamentary group, succeeding Matthias Güldner. Her successor in this office is Björn Fecker. She was the environmental policy spokeswoman for her group until 2019. She was represented in the committee for affairs of the ports in the state of Bremen, operating committee "Umweltbetrieb Bremen", temporary committee for the amendment of the state constitution and in the constitution and rules of procedure committee as well as in the state and municipal deputation for environment, construction, transport, urban development and energy and the urban deputation for economy, labour and ports.

In the summer of 2018, Schaefer prevailed in a primary election for the top candidate of the Greens for the 2019 Bremen state election with 223,191 votes against the senator and mayor Karoline Linnert. After an increase in votes of around 2 percentage points for the Greens in the Bremen state elections in 2019, Schaefer spoke out in favour of coalition negotiations with the SPD and Die Linke following exploratory talks. In the election campaign, she had not committed herself to any possible alliance.

Schaefer was responsible for the reorganization of inner city traffic in Bremen with a preference for public transport and bicycles.

In December 2022, Schaefer was elected her party's top candidate for the 2023 Bremen state election.

== Personal life ==
Schaefer is married, has one child and lives in Bremen-Vegesack.

== Publications ==
- With Hartmut Koehler, Tobias Freshness, Ingo Dobner, Peter Behrend, Heidi Taubner, Bernd Jastorff, Jürgen Warrelmann & Ulrich Walter: Testing and success control of a phytoremediation process for the remediation of explosives-contaminated soil. Part II: Results of a field experiment. In: UWSF-Z Umweltchem Ökotox. 13 (5), 2001, S. 255–316 (PDF; 534 kB).
- Behavioural Endpoints in Earthworm Ecotoxicology. Evaluation of Different Test Systems in Soil Toxicity Assessment. In: Journal of Soils and Sediments. 3 (2), 2003, S. 79–84 (PDF; 201 kB).
- Earthworms in Contaminated Soils. Ecotoxicological Testing and Biodegradation of Crude Oil. GCA-Verlag. Dissertation, GCA-Verlag, Herdecke 2004, ISBN 3-89863-164-8.
