= Henrike Müller =

German politician (born 1975)

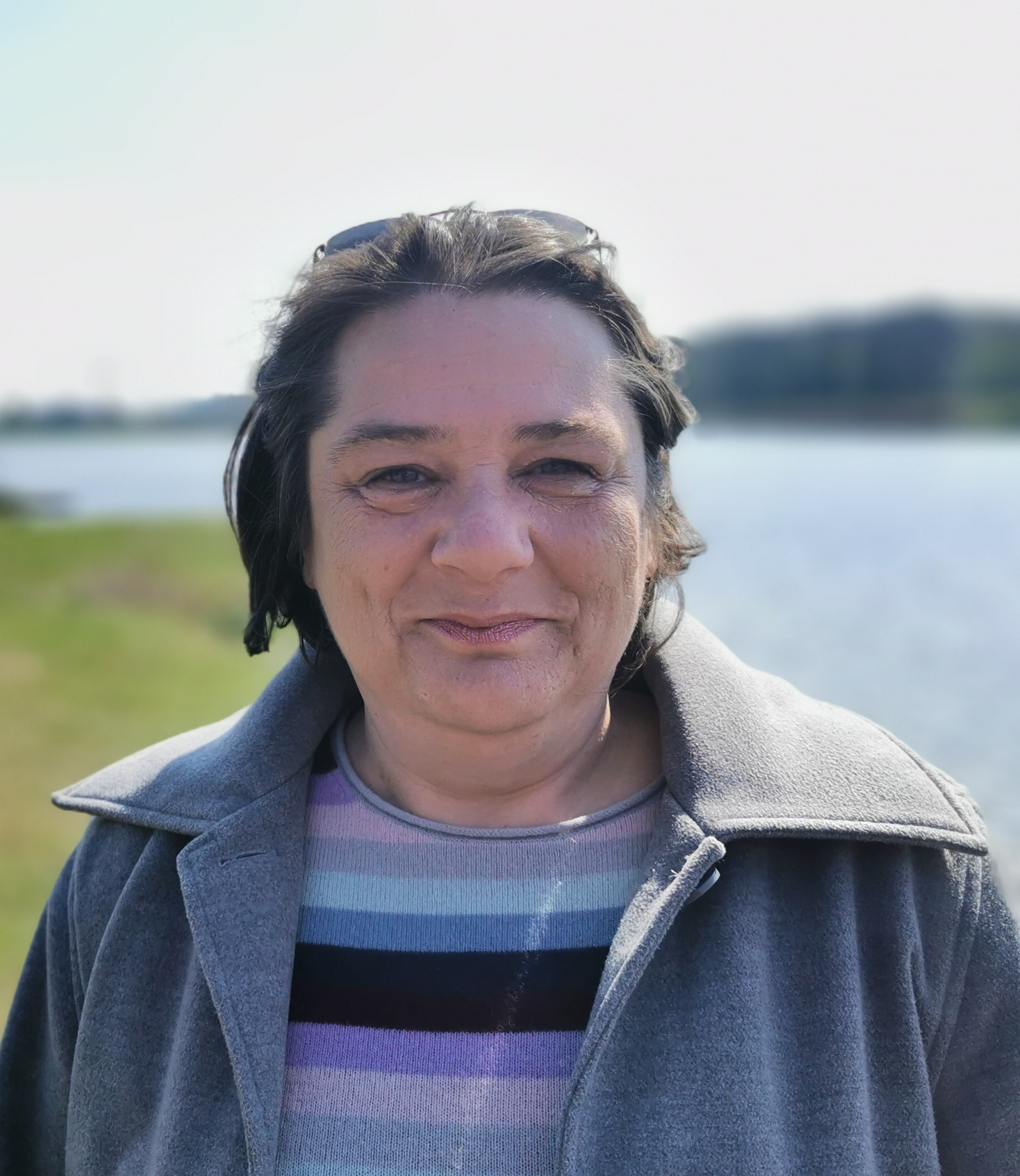
- Henrike Müller (2026)

Senator for Environment, Climate and Science of Bremen
- Incumbent
- Assumed office 12 November 2025
- Mayor: Andreas Bovenschulte
- Preceded by: Björn Fecker (acting); Kathrin Moosdorf

Personal details
- Born: 9 November 1975 (age 50) Dessau
- Party: Alliance 90/The Greens (since 2009)

Henrike Müller (born 9 November 1975) is a German politician serving as senator for environment, climate and science of Bremen since 2025. From 2015 to 2025, she was a member of the Bürgerschaft of Bremen.

== Live ==
Müller joined the Alliance 90/The Greens party in 2009 and was elected to the Mitte (Central) district advisory council during the state parliament (Bürgerschaft) elections in May 2011. In November 2011, she was elected as a co-chair of the Bremen Green Party, serving alongside Hermann Kuhn. She was re-elected in 2013, this time alongside Ralph Saxe, and held the position until January 2016.

In 2015, Müller became a member of the 19th Bremen State Parliament (Bürgerschaft), filling a vacancy that arose when another member joined the Senate. She was re-elected to the state parliament in 2019 and 2023. From July 5, 2023, to November 12, 2025, she served as the leader of her parliamentary group. In the 2019 European elections, Müller ran as the 23rd candidate on the Green Party’s federal list, a position that did not secure her a seat. In March 2024, following the resignation of Malte Gallée, she declined the opportunity to take his place in the European Parliament for the remainder of the legislative term. Upon her election as a Senator on November 12, 2025, she stepped down from the state parliament; Solveig Eschen succeeded her.
