= Borgvattnet =

Village in the county of Jämtland, Sweden

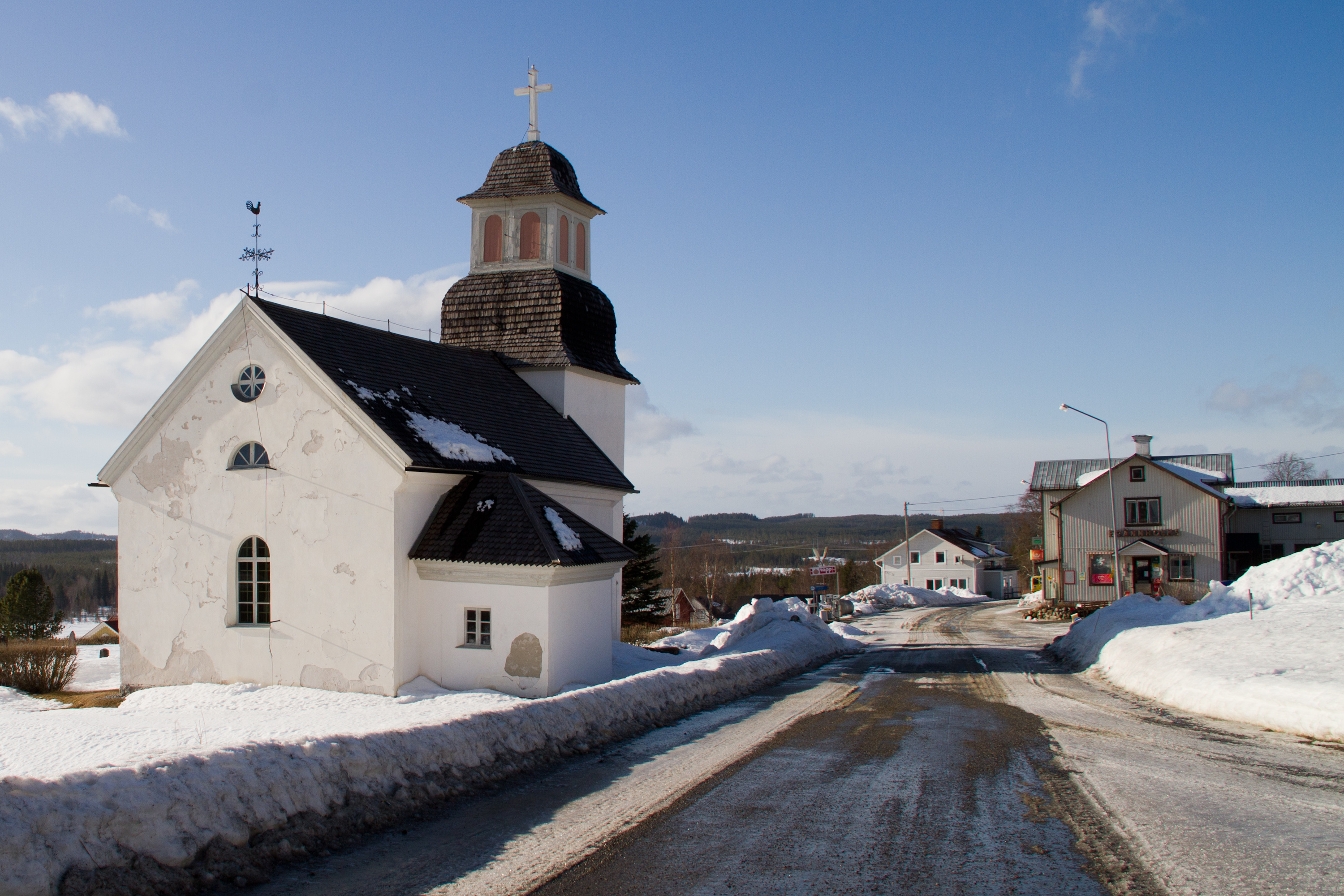

- Location within Sweden
- Coordinates: 63°25′N 15°50′E
- Country: Sweden
- Province: Jämtland
- County: Jämtland County
- Municipality: Ragunda Municipality
- Time zone: UTC+1 (CET)
  - Summer (DST): UTC+2 (CEST)

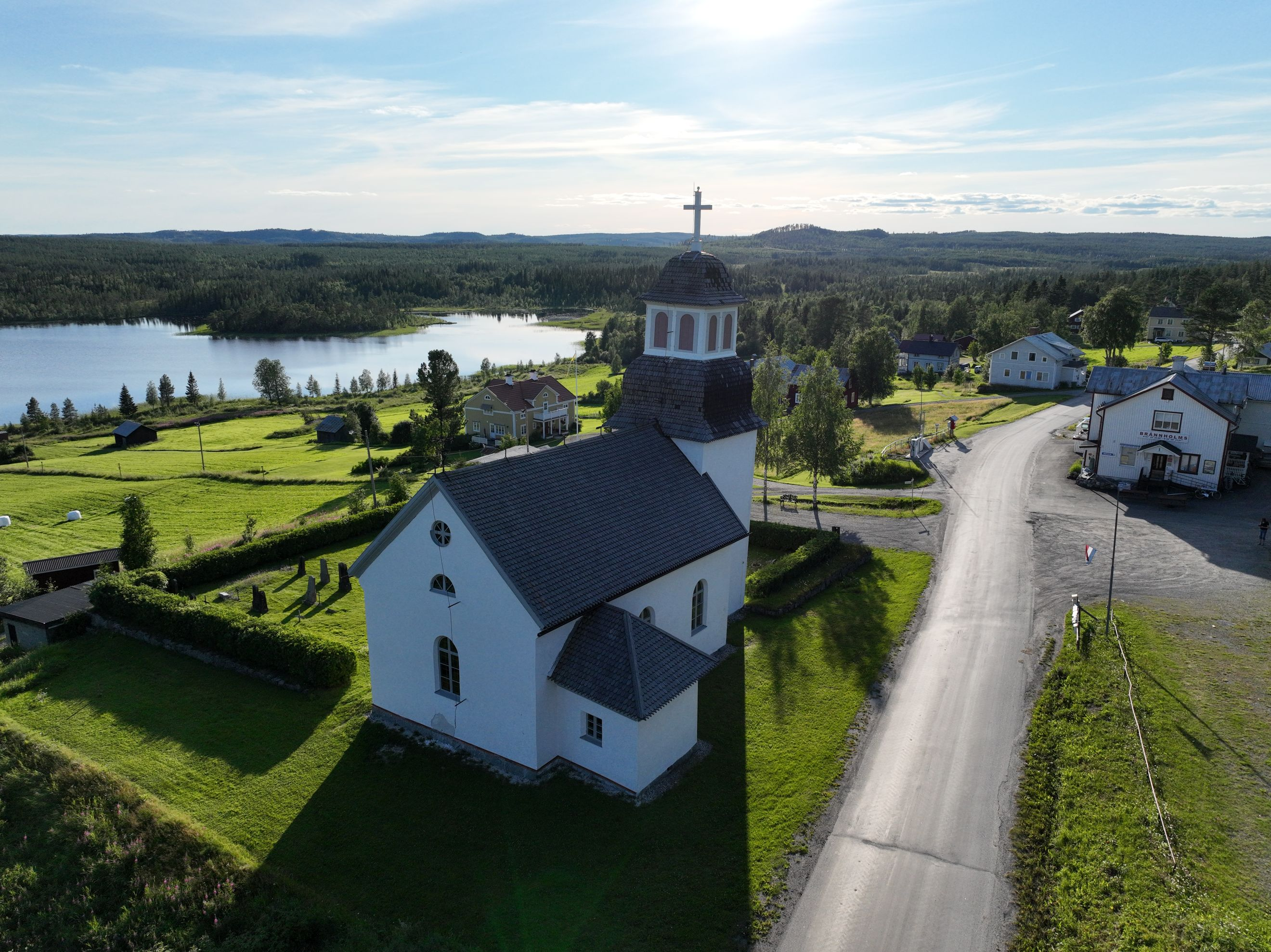
Borgvattnet church and village center with shop

Borgvattnet is a small village in Ragunda Municipality in northern Sweden.

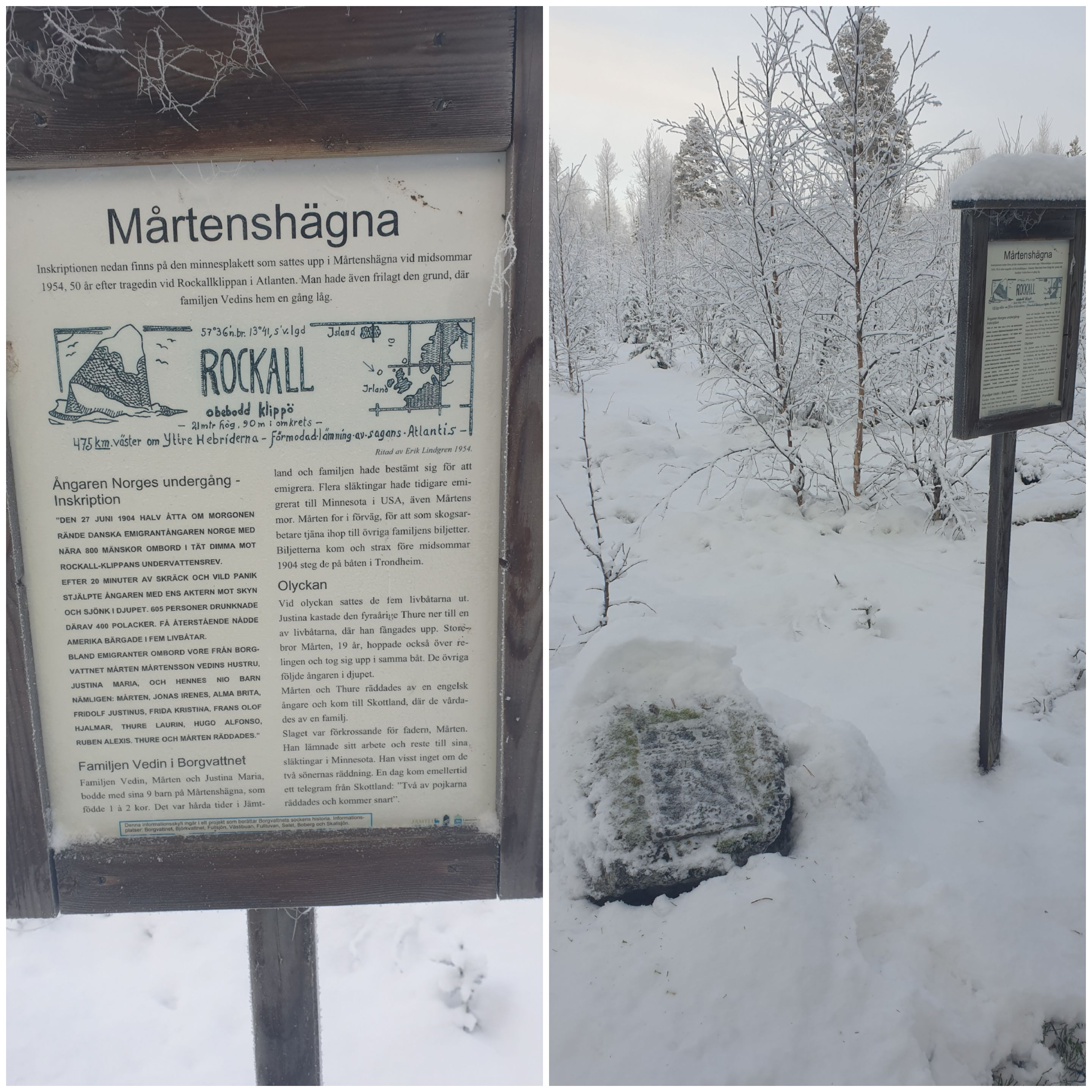
Rockall memorial stone

== Borgvattnet ==
Borgvattnet is a small village in the northeast of the county of Jämtland. After decades of decline in 2022 the population is around 65 residents. The last few years new people have been coming from outside Sweden. They mostly come from Germany and the Netherlands. Even new business have been started. The village is marked by its beautiful church in the village center built in 1782 by Pål Persson from Stugun. It was his first church of this kind. The church is part of the 'Sydöstra Jämtlands pastorat' part of the Swedish Church 'Svenska Kyrkan'. Almost every two weeks services are being held. Against all odds the village still has a working grocery store called 'Brännholms Lanthandel'. This supermarket is also appointed as a service point for the municipality of Ragunda and in 2022 it also became a 'SOT-punkt' as part of the network of 'Lokala service- och trygghetspunkter (SOT-punkter)' - Local service and security points (SOT points). Opposite the store is a petrol station which is driven by the local residents.

Borgvattnet is also renowned for its old vicarage which was built in 1876, and is reputed to be a haunted house. In 1945, chaplain Erik Lindgren moved into the vicarage and he started writing down in his journal all the strange things he experienced. In the early 1970s the vicarage was bought by local entrepreneur Erik Brännholms who turned the house into a hostel. Overnight guests were given a certificate after their stay in the vicarage.

Tore Forslund or the ghostpriest was a priest who worked in Borgvattnet in 1981 and he offered the village to relieve Borgvattnet from the ghosts that were said to dwell in the old vicarage. He was also strongly against the occult phenomena that existed in the district. Disappointed at not being able to meet the accusations the cathedral chapter had against him he decided to leave the Church of Sweden in 1981.

Ghost Hunters International has investigated the place and aired the episode in their first season in January 2009.

On midsummer 1954, a memorial stone was placed in memory of the Vedin family, of whom 9 members (mother and 8 kids) drowned after the sinking of the passenger steamship SS Norge near the Rockall plateau in the North Atlantic Ocean on June 28, 1904. Up to this date this disaster remains the worst in Danish maritime history. From a crew of 68 and 727 passengers, only 160 people survived. Justin Vedin had sold their small farm and most of their possession and bordered the SS Norge with her children to emigrate to the United States to join her husband, Mårten Mårtensson Vedin. Miraculously two children of the Vedin family, 4 year old Thure and the eldest son Mårten survived and were reunited with their father in August 1904. The memorial stone can still be found in a part of Borgvattnets forest at a place called 'Mårtenshägna'.
