= Kristina Vogt =

German politician

Kristina Vogt Member of Bremer Bürgerschaft
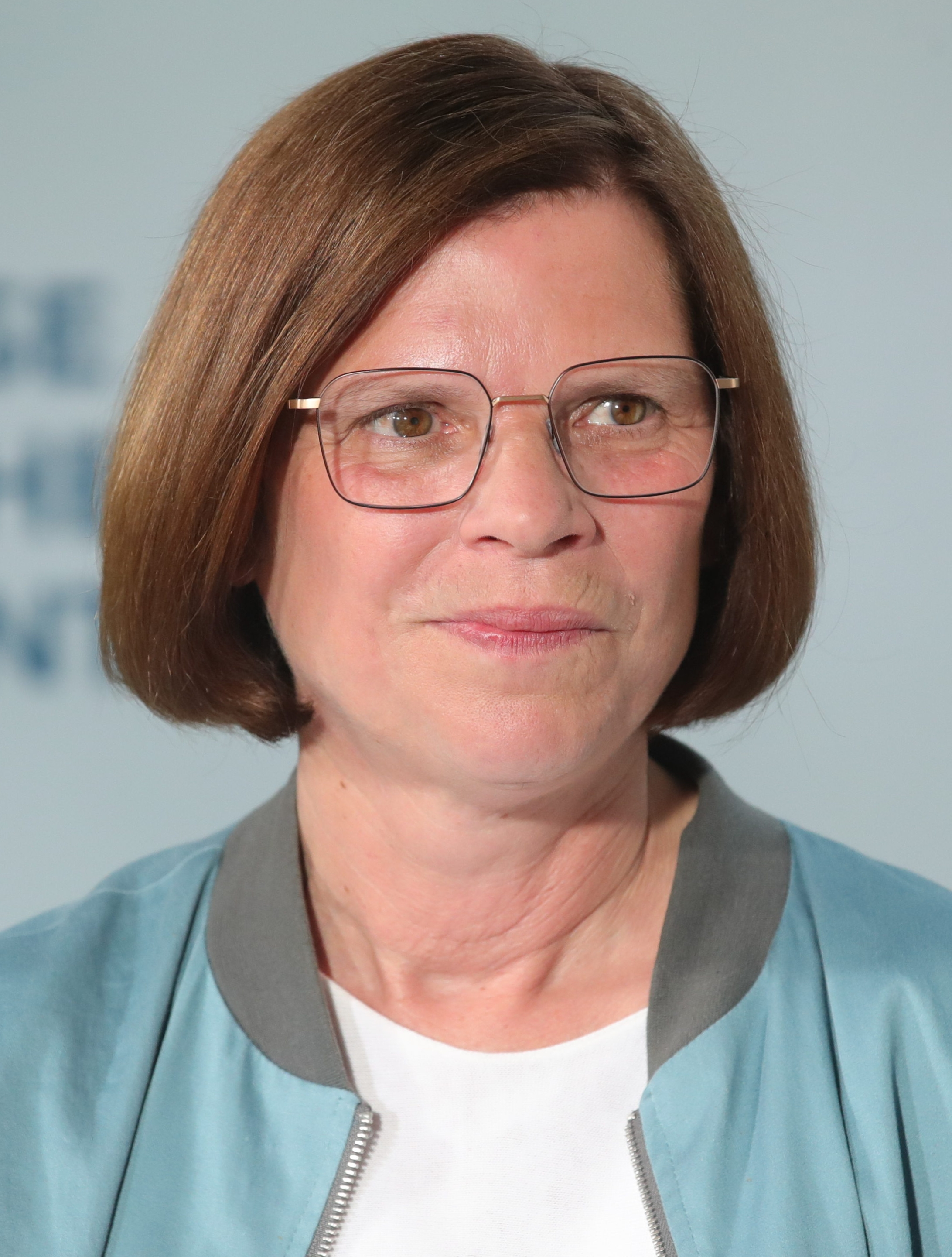
- Kristina Vogt in 2023

Senator for Economics, Harbours and Transformation (Die Senatorin für Wirtschaft, Häfen und Transformation)
- In office 2019–2027
- Preceded by: Martin Günthner
- Leader: Andreas Bovenschulte

Member of Bremer Bürgerschaft
- In office 2011–2019

Personal details
- Born: 3 June 1965 (age 61) Münster, North Rhine-Westphalia, West Germany
- Party: The Left
- Children: 1

Kristina Vogt (born 3 June 1965 in Münster) is a German politician from The Left and former member of the Bürgerschaft of Bremen. Since August 2019 she has been Bremen's Senator for Economics, Labour and Europe in the Bovenschulte senate.

== Biography ==
=== Education and career ===
Vogt passed her Abitur in Münster. She is a paralegal and a single mother. She has lived in West Bremen since 1984.

=== Politics ===
Vogt has been a member of the Left Party since 2008 and was a member of her party's state executive from 2010 to 2011. From 2008 to 2011 she was active as a knowledgeable citizen on the advisory board of the Bremen-Walle district. From February 2011 to June 2011, Vogt was also a member of the Deputation for the Environment, Construction and Transport.

In the 2011 Bremen state election, she was the top candidate of the Bremen Left Party and has been a member of the Bremen state parliament since 8 June 2011. She was elected leader of the Left Party parliamentary group. Vogt is currently spokeswoman for her parliamentary group for education and home affairs.

In her first electoral term, she represented her parliamentary group in the committees: poverty reduction, (temporary) amendment of the state constitution, constitutional and internal rules, election verification, science, media, data protection and freedom of information and was a member of the parliamentary control commission (guest status). She was also a member of the Committee for Education.

In the 2015 Bremen state election, she ran again as the top candidate for the Bremen Left Party. In her second legislative period, she was a member of the parliamentary group for education, the constitution and rules of procedure committee and the parliamentary control commission (guest status).

In the 2019 Bremen state election, she again ran as the top candidate of the Bremen Left Party. Since August 2019 she has been Bremen's Senator for Economics, Labor and Europe in the Bovenschulte Senate, succeeding Senator Martin Günthner (SPD). She thus retired from parliament.

In the 2023 Bremen state election, she is her party's top candidate for the fourth time in a row.
