= Özlem Ünsal =

German politician (born 1974)

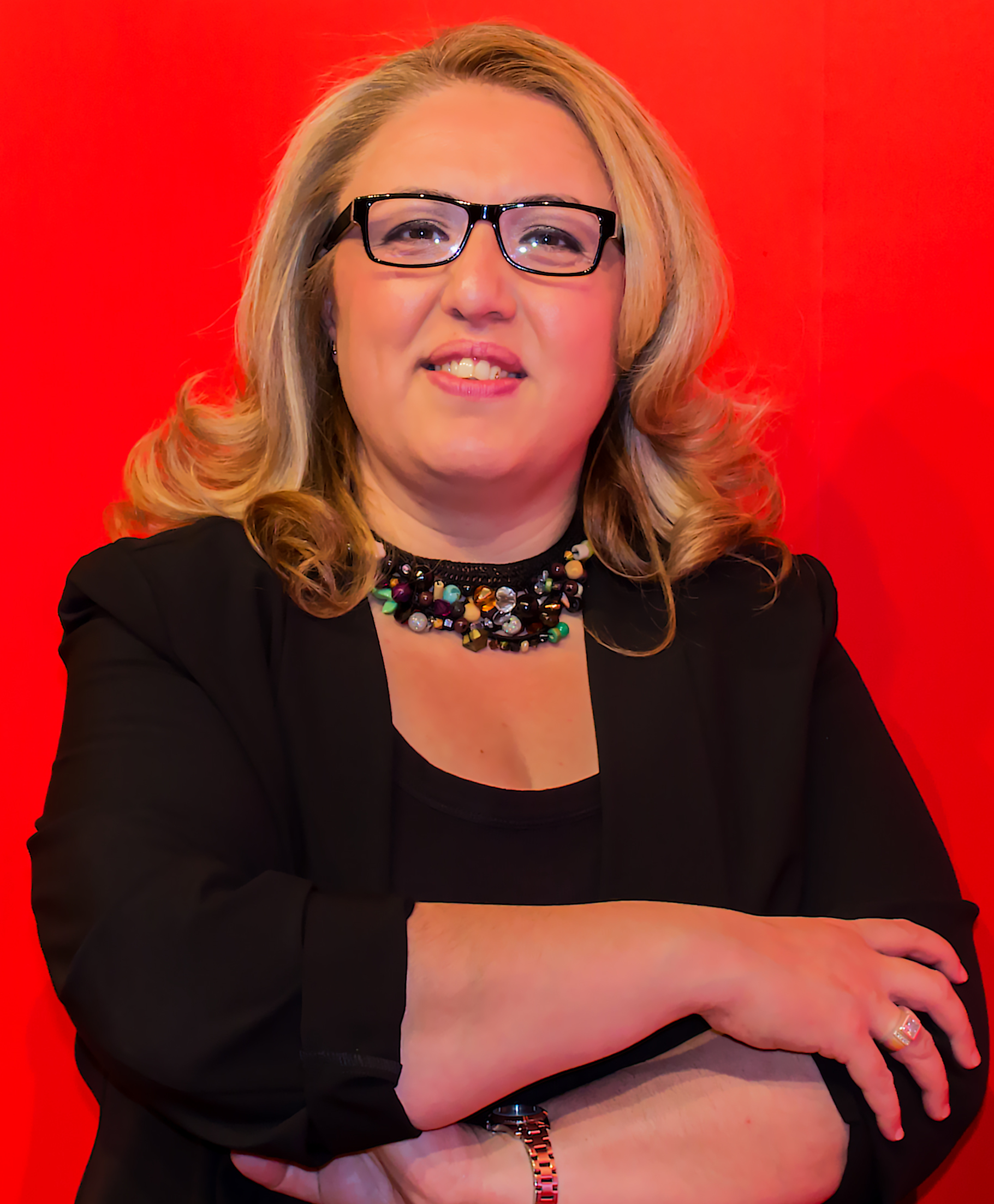
- Ünsal in 2017

Senator for Construction, Mobility and Urban Development of Bremen
- Incumbent
- Assumed office 5 July 2023
- Mayor: Andreas Bovenschulte
- Preceded by: Maike Schaefer

Personal details
- Born: 16 May 1974 (age 51)
- Party: Social Democratic Party

Özlem Ünsal (born 16 May 1974) is a Turkish-born German politician serving as senator for construction, mobility and urban development of Bremen since 2023. From 2017 to 2022, she was a member of the Landtag of Schleswig-Holstein.
