= Mark Rackles =

German politician (born 1966)

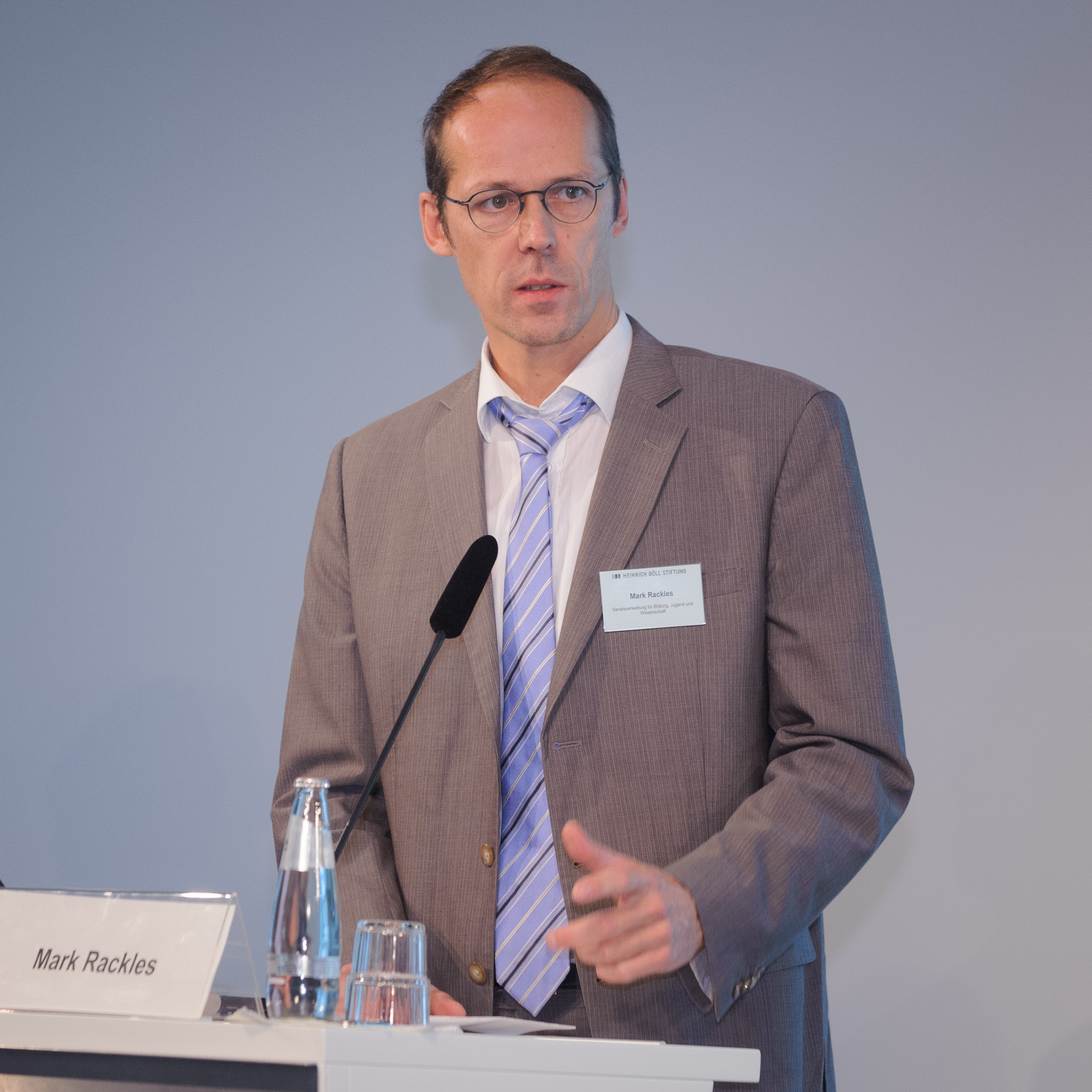
- Rackles in 2012

Senator for Children and Education of Bremen
- Incumbent
- Assumed office 8 October 2025
- Mayor: Andreas Bovenschulte
- Preceded by: Sascha Karolin Aulepp

Personal details
- Born: 26 September 1966 (age 59)
- Party: Social Democratic Party (since 1986)

Mark Rackles (born 26 September 1966) is a German politician serving as senator for children and education of Bremen since 2025. From 2011 to 2019, he served as state secretary for youth and family affairs of Berlin.
