= Tore Forslund =

Tore Forslund (26 February 1927 – 15 March 2000), also known as Spökprästen ("the ghostpriest"), was a writer, poet, Lutheran priest, street musician, and editor of the magazine A Voice Crying in the Wilderness, that he founded 1957.

== Biography ==
Tore Forslund was born 26 February 1927 in Krylbo, Sweden. His mother was an officer in the Salvation Army, and his father was a post office employee.

Forslund was ordained as a Lutheran priest in Luleå Cathedral on 19 December 1956, after a few years of studies at Johannelunds Teologiska Högskola and Lund University. He held his first sermon at age 18, on New Year's Day 1946, and his last public sermon was held in Alvesta in 1999.

Forslund could often be seen on the streets of Sweden playing his favorite instrument, a concertina. He called Sergelgatan in Stockholm his "central sanctuary".

His nickname, "the ghostpriest", came to be during a period when he worked as a priest in Borgvattnet, Jämtland, in 1981. He offered to relieve the village of the ghosts that were said to reside in the old parsonage. He was strongly against the occult phenomena that existed in the district. They sold miniature angels and devils in the village shop, and if a person dared to sleep overnight in the old parsonage, now a converted hotel, a diploma was handed out. Disappointed at not being able to meet the accusations of the cathedral chapter, he decided to leave the Swedish church in 1981 and started to work independently with a full-time street mission.

Forslund's controversial preaching methods often made him an object of discussion. He was liked by many and hated by others. He raised debate and anger among many who only saw him as a stubborn and provocative prophet of doom.

Forslund was always very open, and often started conversations with strangers. Migrants and marginalized people often became his best friends.

Tore Forslund died 15 March 2000, at Växjö hospital, age 73.
