= Tuukka Smura =

Finnish ice hockey player

- Born: June 5, 1995 (age 29); Kajaani, Finland
- Height: 6 ft 2 in (188 cm)
- Weight: 220 lb (100 kg; 15 st 10 lb)
- Position: Goaltender
- Catches: Left
- Liiga team: KalPa
- Playing career: 2013–present

Tuukka Smura (born June 5, 1995) is a Finnish ice hockey goaltender. He made his Liiga debut during the 2013–14 Liiga season with KalPa, for whom he is currently playing.
