= Thore Schäck =

German economist and politician

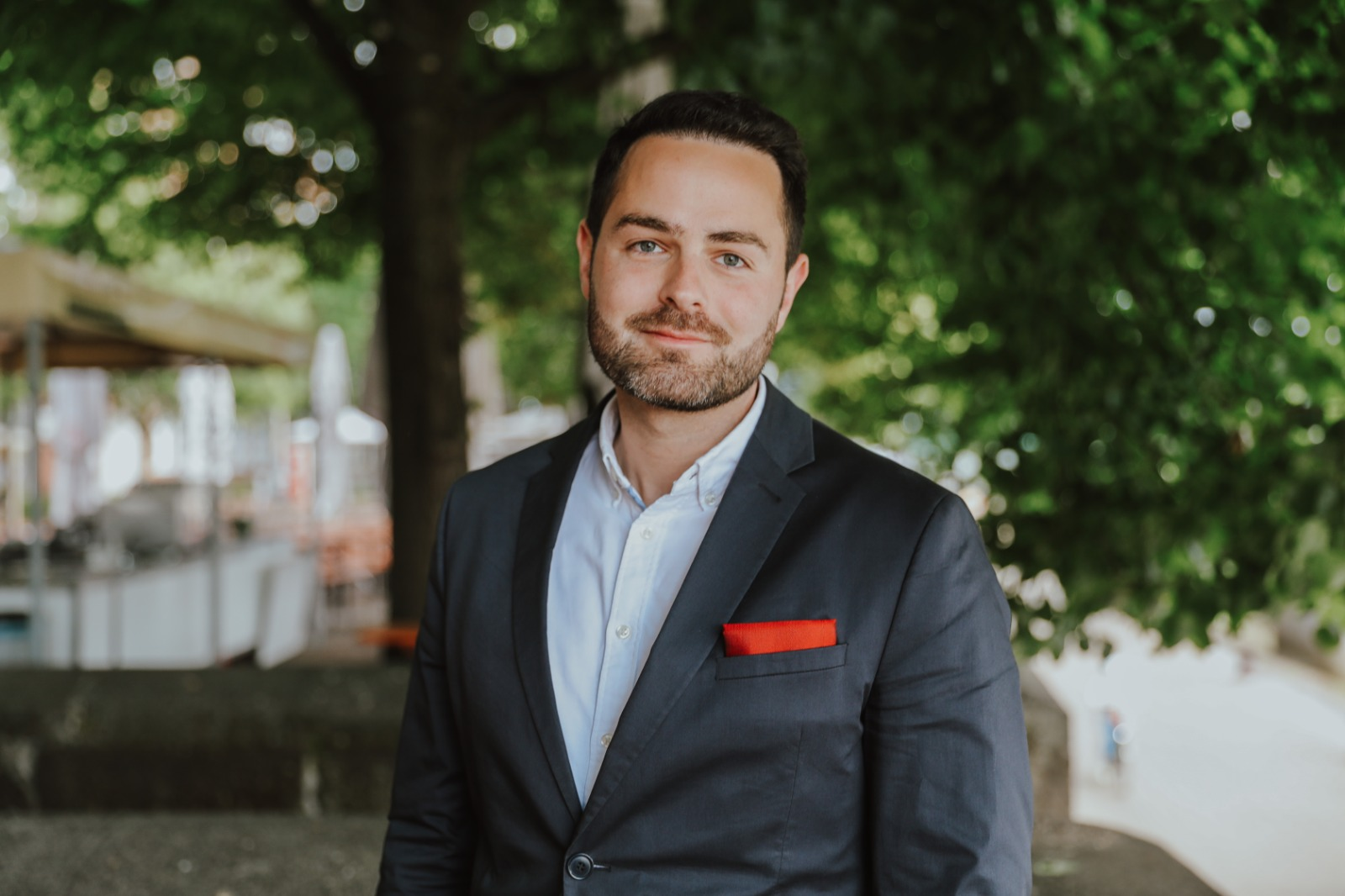
- Thore Schäck in 2022

Leader of the Free Democratic Party in the Bürgerschaft of Bremen
- Incumbent
- Assumed office October 2020
- Preceded by: Hauke Hilz

Member of the Bürgerschaft of Bremen for Bremen
- Incumbent
- Assumed office 8 June 2019
- Preceded by: multi-member district

Thore Schäck (born 1985) is a German entrepreneur and politician from the Free Democratic Party. He has been a member of the Bürgerschaft of Bremen since 2019 and has been state chairman of the Bremen FDP since 2020.

== Biography ==
=== Family and education ===
Schäck was born in Delmenhorst in Lower Saxony and grew up in Bremen. He attended the Free Waldorf School in Bremen. Schäck passed his Abitur there in 2005 and then completed his community service in Bremen at Fritz-Gansberg.

Schäck is married and lives in Bremen-Horn. He is a member of the associations "Die Bremer Suppengel eV" and "Bürgerpark Bremen".

Between 2006 and 2009, Schäck studied business administration at the University of Bayreuth, graduating with a Bachelor of Science. During this time he was the dual chairman of the student council and spokesman for the economics students.

Schäck then studied business psychology at the University of Bremen and completed his studies in 2012 with a Master of Science.

=== Business career ===
After completing his studies, Schäck worked for a year as a management consultant in Frankfurt am Main. Schäck then returned to Bremen and over the next five years built up the human resources department of a Bremen start-up company with around 150 employees. From September 2018 to June 2020, Schäck headed the human resources department of the Hamburg company About You, most recently in a director position. Schäck has been the sole owner and managing director of the investment company TIE Investa UG (limited liability) since 2020. This is the 100% owner of Hansereich GmbH. Here Schäck is employed as managing director. The Hansereich GmbH was created in 2022 by renaming pleetsch.me GmbH.. At the same time, the purpose of the company changed from "Providing digitization offers from technology and software for senior citizens" to "Trade in clothing, electrical goods and fashion accessories".

Schäck also works part-time at FREQCON GmbH.

=== Political career ===
Schäck initially worked for the SPD Bremen in the Horn-Achterdiek branch for a short time. He then left the SPD.

Schäck has since been a member of the Young Liberals and a member of the Bremen Free Democratic Party. In April 2017, he was elected state chairman at the state general meeting of the Young Liberals in Bremen and was confirmed in office for another year in 2018. In spring 2017, Schäck was elected as an assessor to the state board of the FDP Bremen and co-opted to the board of the Bremen-East district association. In the spring of 2018, he was elected to the executive state board of the FDP Bremen and deputy district chairman of the district association Bremen-East.

For the 2017 German federal election, Schäck ran unsuccessfully for the FDP in fifth place on the state list.

At the state general assembly of the Young Liberals in Bremen in November 2018, he was nominated as their top candidate for the 2019 state elections, and the FDP state party conference in November 2018 elected him third place on the state list.

In May 2019 he became a member of the Bremen Parliament. He is the FDP's construction, transport and financial policy spokesman. He is a member of the following committees:

- Controlling committees
- Budget and Finance Committees
- Audit Committees
- Deputation for mobility, construction and urban development
- Committee for Citizen Participation, Civic Engagement and Advisory Boards

In October 2020, Schäck was elected state chairman of the FDP Bremen to succeed Hauke Hilz. In 2022 he was re-elected. On August 27, 2022, Schäck was elected the top candidate of the FDP Bremen for the 2023 Bremen state election with 91.6%.

As chairman of the Bremen state association, Schäck has been a permanent guest on the federal executive board of the FDP since spring 2021. In addition, as the top candidate of the FDP Bremen for the 2023 state elections, he has been a guest on the FDP Presidium since August 2022.
