= Tore (given name) =

Tore is a Scandinavian masculine name. It is derived from the Old Norse name Þórir, itself from an older reconstructed form Þórvér, which is composed of Þórr meaning thunder, and vér meaning priest or warrior. So Thor's Priest, Thunder Priest, Thor's Warrior, or Thunder Warrior. The most famous person by this name is probably Tore Hund, who killed Olaf II of Norway at the Battle of Stiklestad. Approximately 18,000 people in Norway are named Tore.

Notable people named Tore include:

- Tore Asplund (1903–1977), Swedish-born American painter
- Tore Austad (1935–2025), Norwegian politician, Minister of Education and Church Affairs
- Tore Berger (1944–2026), Norwegian sprint canoeist
- Tore Blom (1880–1961), Swedish track and field athlete and Olympian
- Tore Brovold (born 1970), Norwegian skeet shooter
- Tore Brunborg (born 1960), Norwegian jazz musician, saxophonist and composer
- Tore Cervin (born 1950), Swedish footballer
- Tore André Dahlum (born 1968), Norwegian former footballer
- Tore Edman (1904–1995), Swedish ski jumper
- Tore Ellingsen (born 1962), Norwegian economist
- Tore Eriksen (born 1947), Norwegian economist, diplomat and civil servant
- Tore Linné Eriksen (born 1945), Norwegian historian
- Tore Eriksson (1937–2017), Swedish biathlete and Olympic medalist
- Tore André Flo (born 1973), Norwegian football striker
- Tore Forslund (1927–2000), Swedish writer, poet, Lutheran priest, street musician and magazine editor
- Tore Foss (1901–1968), Norwegian singer, actor and theatre director
- Tore Gjelsvik (1916–2006), Norwegian geologist and polar explorer, and resistance fighter in World War II
- Tore Gullen (born 1949), Norwegian cross-country skier and Olympic athlete
- Tore Andreas Gundersen (born 1986), Norwegian footballer
- Tore Gustafsson (born 1962), Swedish hammer thrower and Olympic athlete
- Tore Hagebakken (born 1961), Norwegian politician
- Tore Hamsun (1912–1995), Norwegian painter, writer, publisher; son of Knut Hamsun
- Tore Haugen (born 1931), Norwegian politician
- Tore Hedin (1927–1952), Swedish mass murderer
- Tore Hem (born 1944), Norwegian sport wrestler and Olympic competitor
- Tore Viken Holvik (born 1988), Norwegian snowboarder
- Tore Ruud Hofstad (born 1979), Norwegian cross-country skier and Olympic athlete
- Tore Holm (1896–1977), Swedish sailor in numerous Olympic Games
- Tore Janson (born 1936), Swedish linguist and professor
- Tore Johansson, Swedish record producer, composer and musician
- Tore Johnsen (born 1969), Norwegian clergyman and leader of the Sami Church Council
- Tore Kallstad (born 1965), Norwegian footballer
- Tore Keller (1905–1988), Swedish football striker and Olympic athlete
- Tore Killingland (born 1953), Norwegian business manager, environmentalist and politician
- Tore Klevstuen (born 1966), Norwegian speed skater and Olympic athlete
- Tore Krogstad (born 1967), Norwegian football goalkeeper
- Tore Lennartsson (born 1952), Swedish footballer
- Tore Vagn Lid (born 1973), Norwegian theatre director, playwright and musician
- Tore A. Liltved (1939–2004), Norwegian politician
- Tore Lindbekk (1933–2017), Norwegian sociologist and politician
- Tore Lindholt (1941–2021), Norwegian economist, civil servant and politician
- Tore Lindzén (1914–2003), Swedish water polo player and Olympic athlete
- Tore Ljungqvist (1905–1980), Swedish water polo player and Olympic athlete
- Tore Lokoloko (1930–2013), former Governor-General of Papua New Guinea
- Tore Meinecke (born 1967), German tennis player
- Tore Falch Nilsen (1948–2008), Norwegian ice hockey player and Olympic athlete
- Tore Nordenstam (born 1934), Swedish philosopher
- Tore Nordseth (born 1966), Norwegian politician
- Tore Nordtun (born 1949), Norwegian politician
- Tore Nordtvedt (born 1944), Norwegian footballer
- Tore Ørjasæter (1886–1968), Norwegian poet
- Tore Østby (born 1972), Norwegian songwriter, producer and guitarist
- Tore Pedersen (born 1969), Norwegian football defender
- Tore Pryser (born 1945), Norwegian historian and professor
- Tore Bernt Ramton (1945–2010), Norwegian sports official
- Tore Reginiussen (born 1986), Norwegian footballer
- Tore Renberg (born 1972), Norwegian writer
- Tore Olaf Rimmereid (born 1962), Norwegian businessman
- Tore Sagvolden (born 1959), Norwegian orienteering competitor
- Tore Sandvik (born 1972), Norwegian orienteering competitor and World champion
- Tore Schei (born 1946), Chief Justice of the Supreme Court of Norway
- Tore Schweder (born 1943), Norwegian statistician and professor
- Tore Segelcke (1901–1979), Norwegian actress
- Tore Strømøy (born 1960), Norwegian journalist, television presenter, talk show host and former racewalker
- Tore Svennberg (1858–1941), Swedish stage and film actor and theatre director
- Tore Tønne (1948–2002), Norwegian politician, Minister of Health and Social Affairs 2000–2001
- Tore Torgersen (born 1968), Norwegian ten-pin bowler
- Tore Torvbråten (born 1968), Norwegian curler and Olympic medalist
- Tore Tvedt (born 1943), Norwegian founder of the far-right organization Vigrid
- Tore Uppström (1937–2006), Swedish pianist, composer and author
- Tore Vikingstad (born 1975), Norwegian professional ice hockey player
- Tore Wretman (1916–2003), Swedish chef and restaurateur
- Tore Zetterholm (1915–2001), Swedish novelist, playwright and journalist
