= Björn Fecker =

German politician (born 1977)

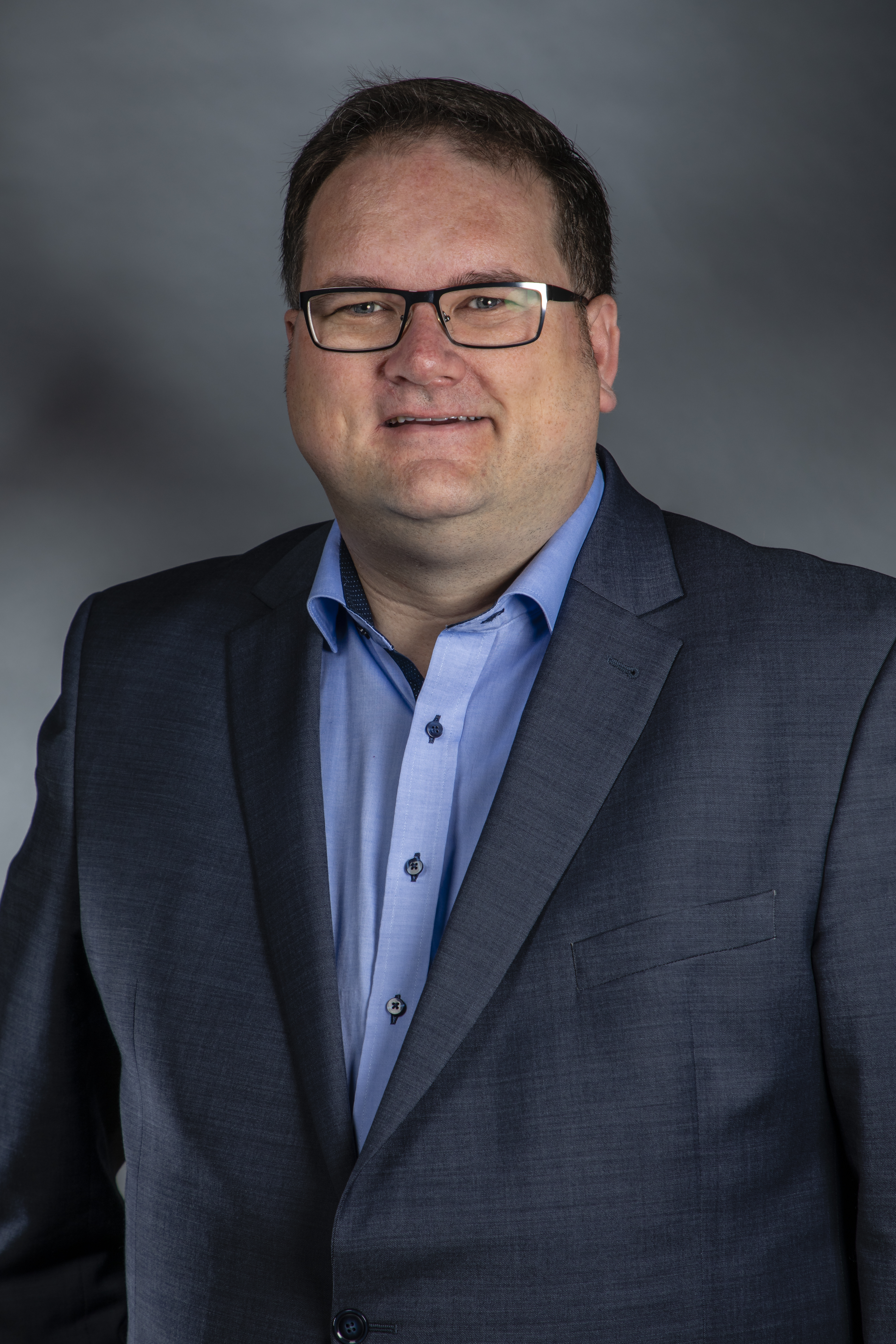
- Fecker in 2019

Senator for Finance of Bremen
- Incumbent
- Assumed office 5 July 2023
- President: Andreas Bovenschulte
- Preceded by: Dietmar Strehl

Personal details
- Born: 13 December 1977 (age 48)
- Party: Alliance 90/The Greens
- Education: University of Bremen

Björn Fecker (born 13 December 1977) is a German politician of the Green Party who has been serving as senator for finance of Bremen since 2023.

== Political career ==
From 2007 to 2023, Fecker was a member of the Bürgerschaft of Bremen. In the state parliament, he led the Green Party’s group from 2019 to 2023.

== Other activities ==
- KfW, Member of the Board of Supervisory Directors (2023–2024)
- Bremen Football Association, President (2020–2023)

== Personal life ==
Fecker is married and has one son.
