= Andreas Bovenschulte =

German politician

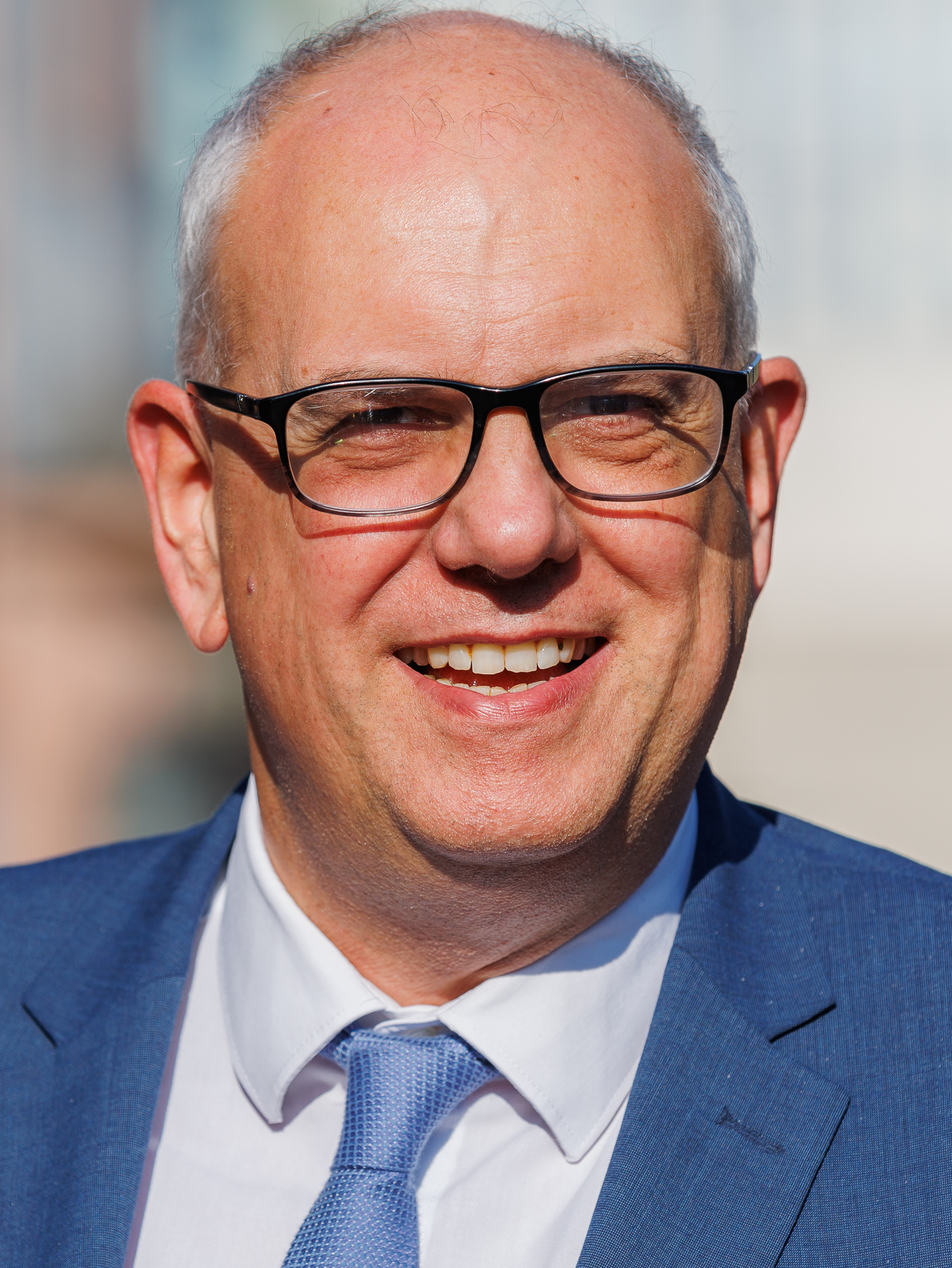
- Bovenschulte in 2024

President of the Bundesrat
- In office 1 November 2025 – 31 October 2026
- First Vice President: Anke Rehlinger
- Preceded by: Anke Rehlinger
- Succeeded by: Hendrik Wüst

President of the Senate and Mayor of the Free Hanseatic City of Bremen
- Incumbent
- Assumed office 15 August 2019
- Deputy: Maike Schaefer (2019-2023); Björn Fecker (2023-present)
- Preceded by: Carsten Sieling

Leader of the Social Democratic Party in the Bürgerschaft of Bremen
- In office 7 June 2019 – 15 August 2019
- Deputy: Petra Krümpfer
- Preceded by: Björn Tschöpe
- Succeeded by: Mustufa Güngör

Mayor of Weyhe
- In office 25 May 2014 – 3 July 2019
- Deputy: Ina Pundsack-Bleith
- Preceded by: Frank Lemmermann
- Succeeded by: Frank Siedel

Leader of the Social Democratic Party of Bremen
- In office 5 June 2010 – 31 December 2013
- Deputy: Sarah Ryglewski; Elias Tsartilidis
- Preceded by: Uwe Beckmeyer
- Succeeded by: Dieter Reinken

Member of the Bürgerschaft of Bremen for Bremen
- In office 8 June 2019 – 15 August 2019
- Preceded by: multi-member district

Personal details
- Born: 11 August 1965 (age 61) Hildesheim, Lower Saxony, West Germany
- Party: Social Democratic Party (1976–present)
- Spouse: Ulrike Hiller (until 2021)
- Education: University of Bremen
- Occupation: Politician; research fellow; economist; industrial clerk

Andreas Bovenschulte (born 11 August 1965) is a German lawyer and politician of the Social Democratic Party (SPD) who has been serving as the President of the Senate and Mayor of Bremen since 2019. He was also president of the Bundesrat.

== Early life and education ==
Bovenschulte was born 1965 in Hildesheim and studied jurisprudence at the University of Bremen.

== Political career ==
In the late 1980s, Bovenschulte served as the University of Bremen's student council president.

From 2010 to 2013 Bovenschulte was chairman of the SPD in Bremen and since August 2019 he is ruling mayor of Bremen.

As one of the state's representatives at the Bundesrat, Bovenschulte serves on the Committee on Foreign Affairs and on the Committee on Defence. On behalf of the SPD, he coordinated the Bundesrat's selection of new judges for the Federal Constitutional Court in 2020.

== Other activities ==
- Business Forum of the Social Democratic Party of Germany, Member of the Political Advisory Board (since 2020)
- Cultural Foundation of the German States (KdL), Ex-Officio Member of the Council (since 2019)
- spw – Zeitschrift für sozialistische Politik und Wirtschaft, Member of the Editorial Board
- Wilhelm and Helene Kaisen Foundation, Member of the Board of Trustees (since 2019)
