= 2015 Bremen state election =

State election in Bremen, Germany

- 10 May 2015

All 83 seats in the Bürgerschaft of Bremen 42 seats needed for a majority
- Turnout: 1,168,352 (50.2%) ▼5.3%
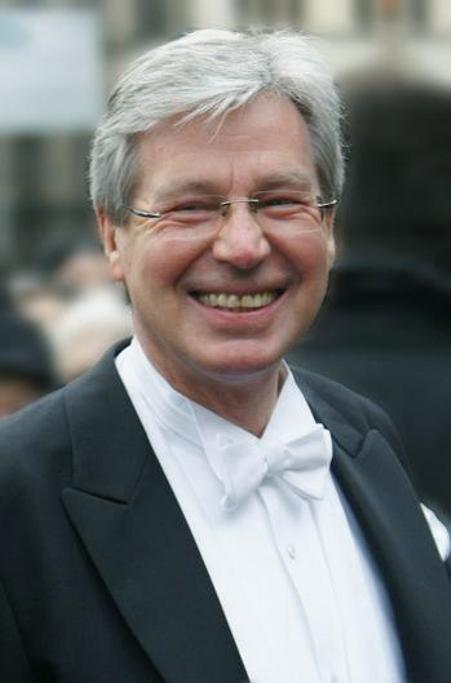

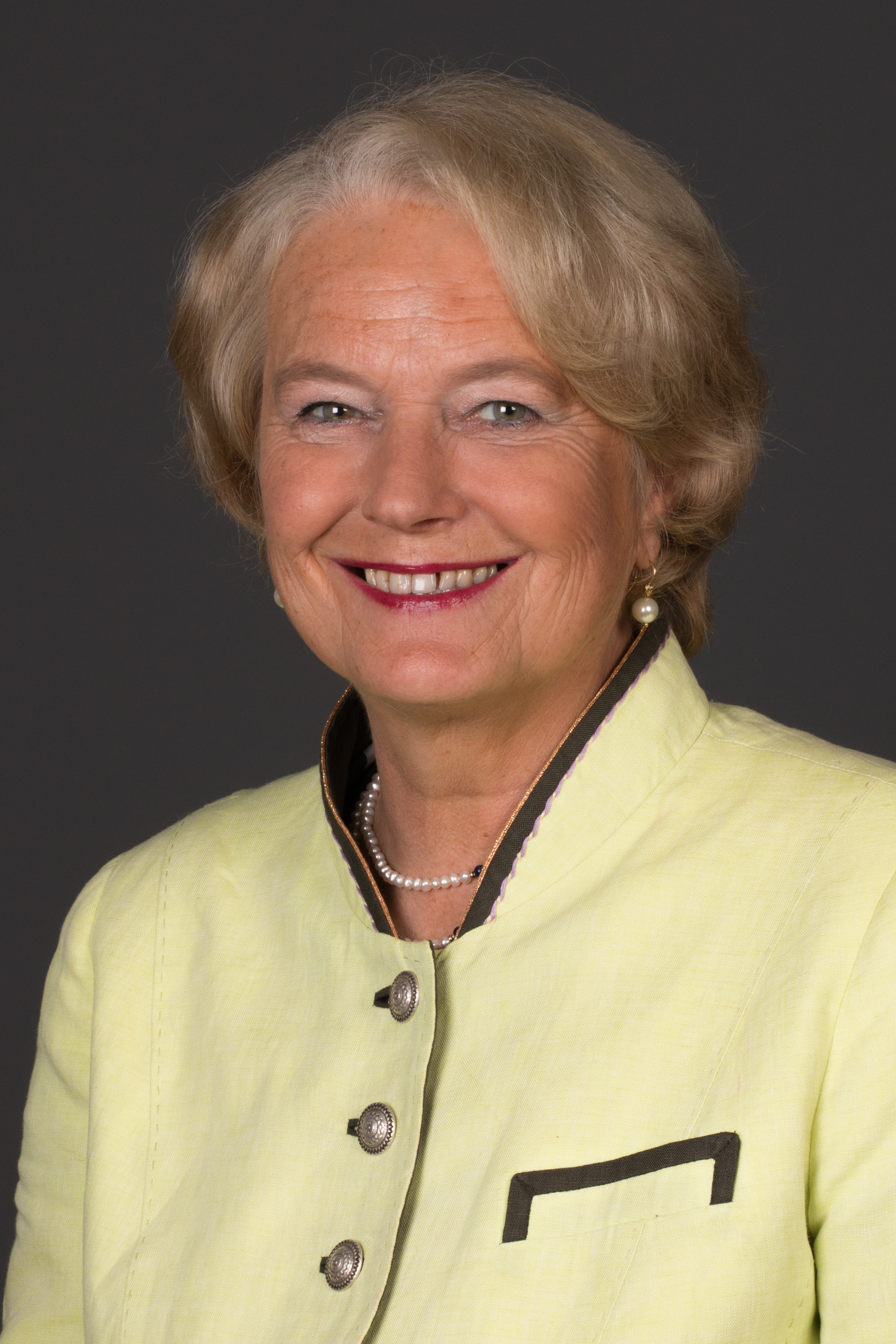

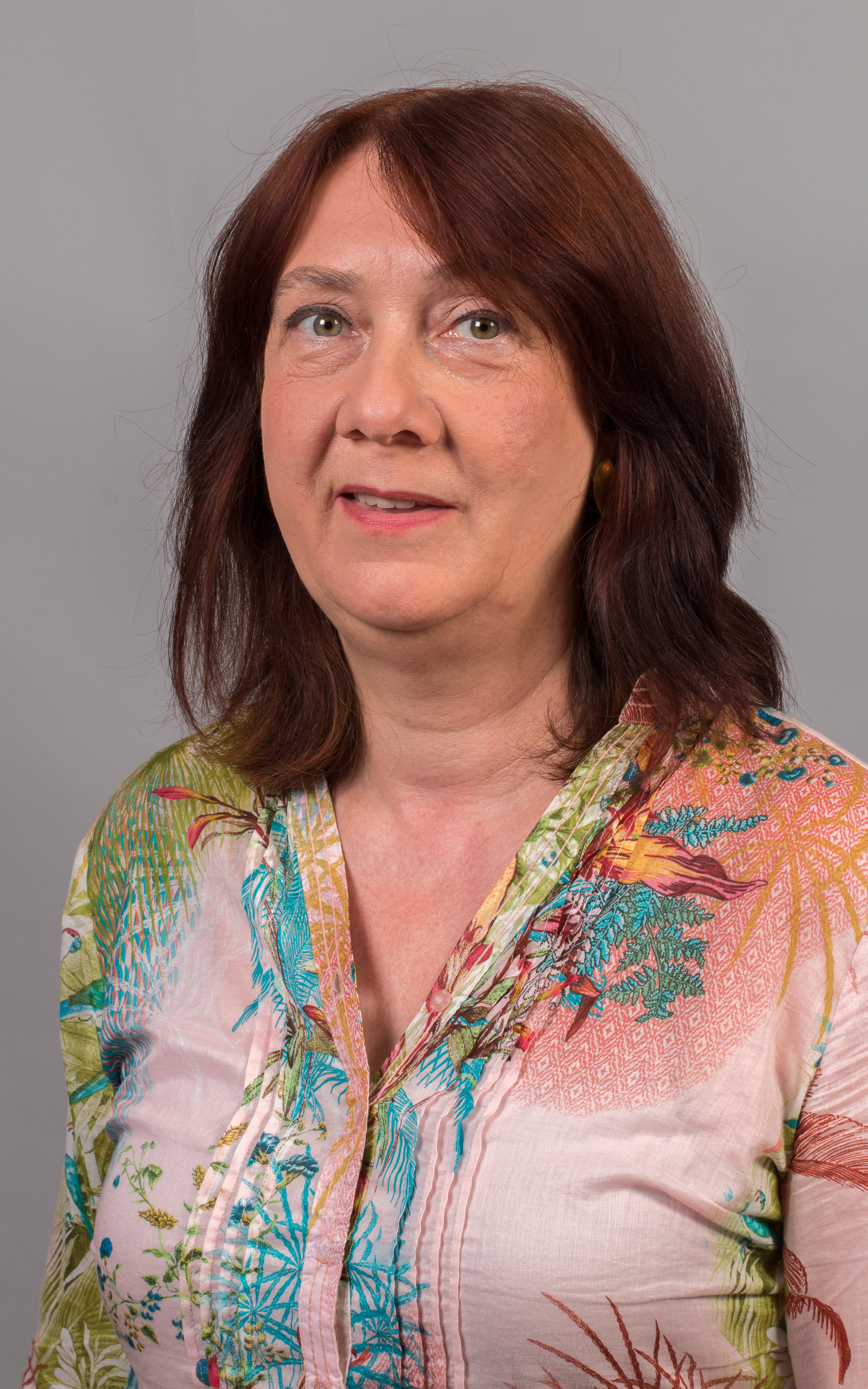

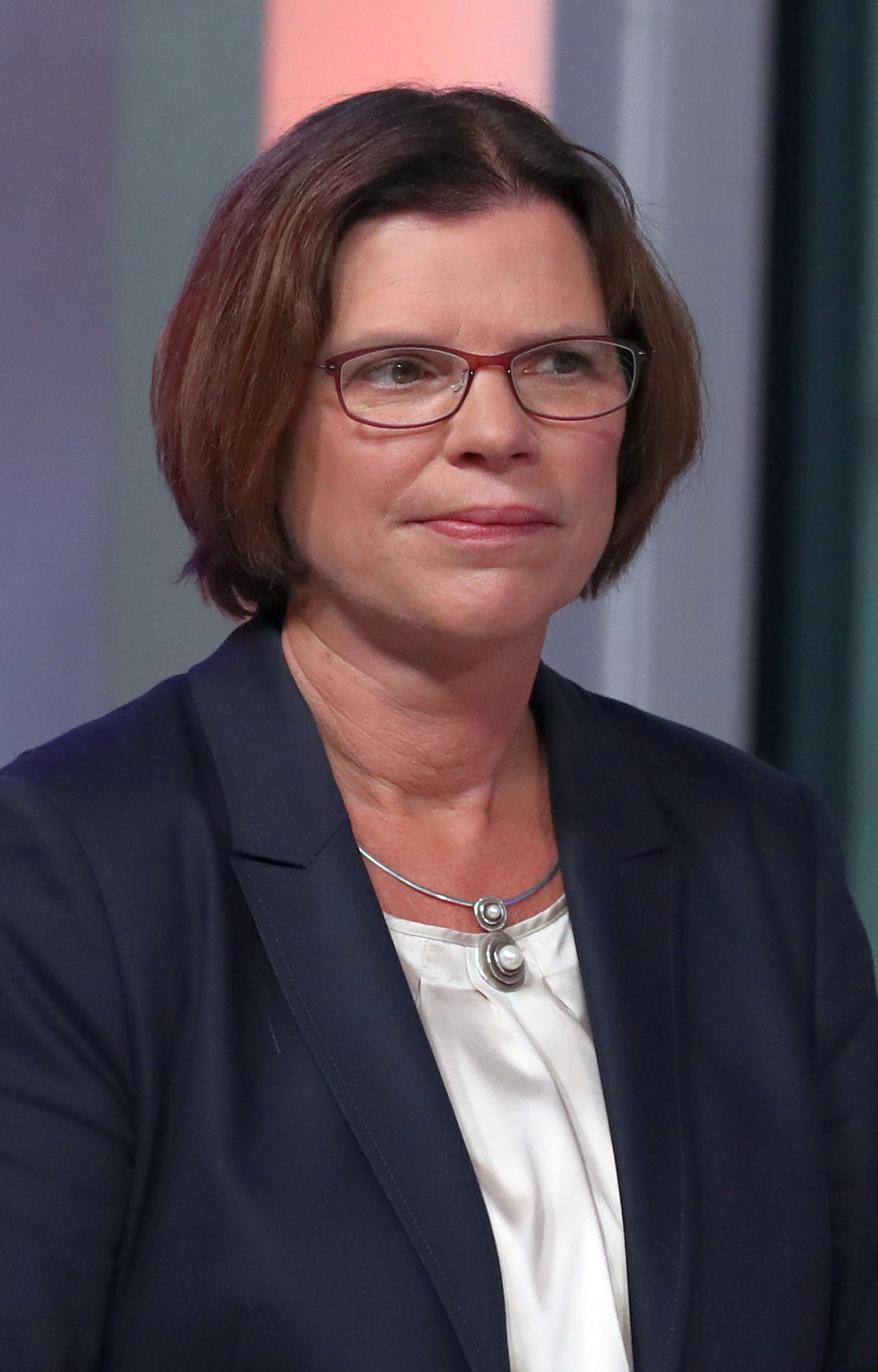

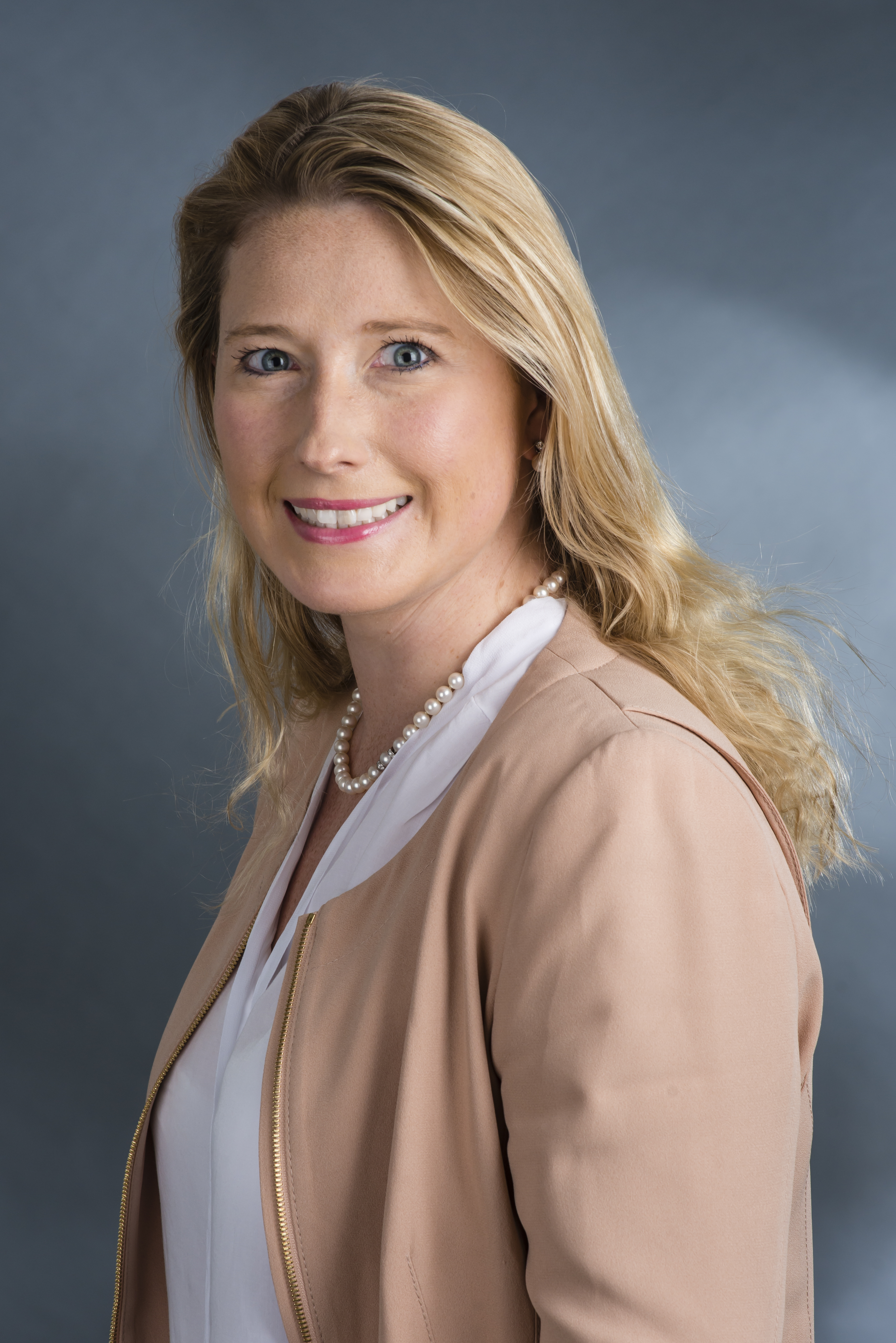

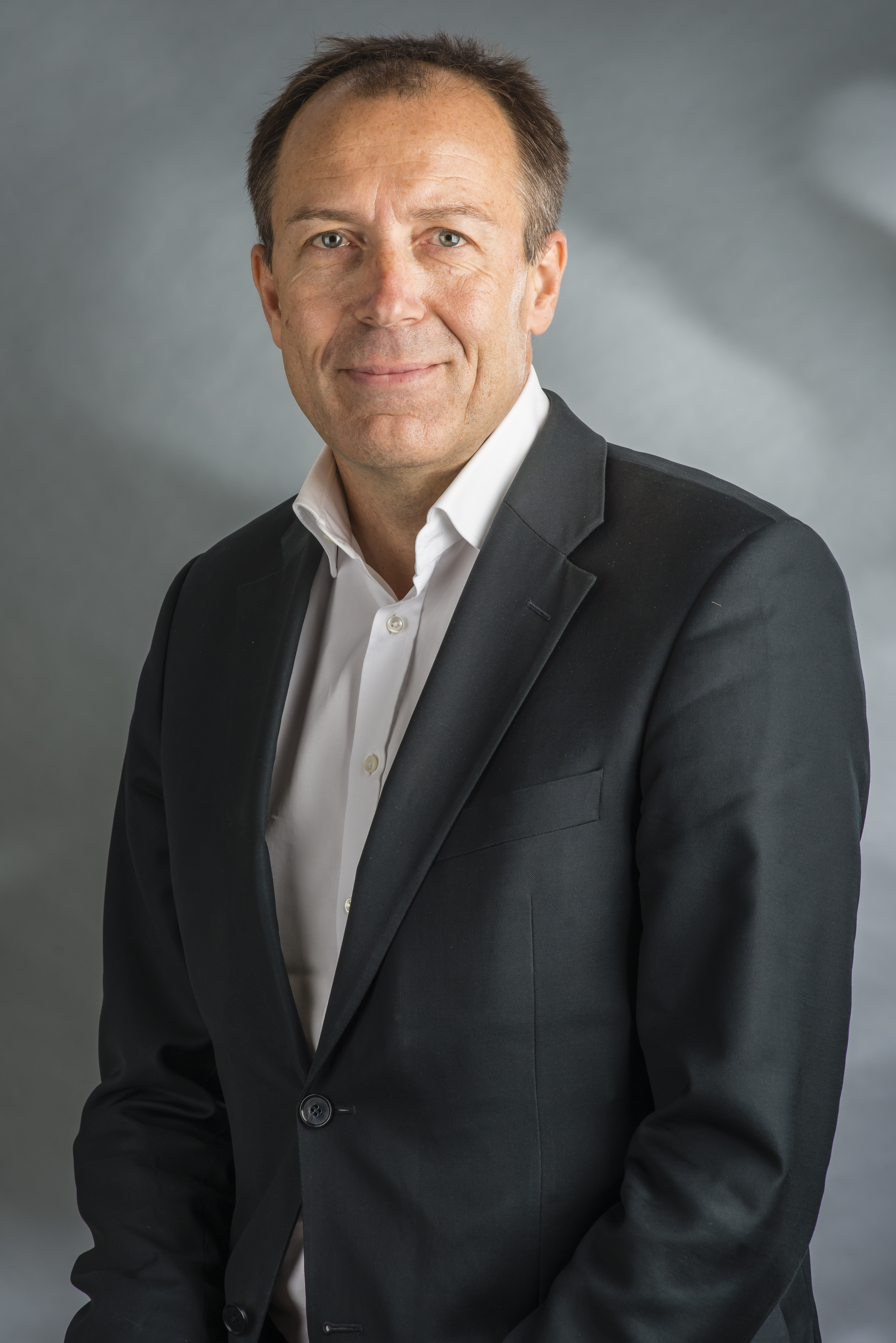

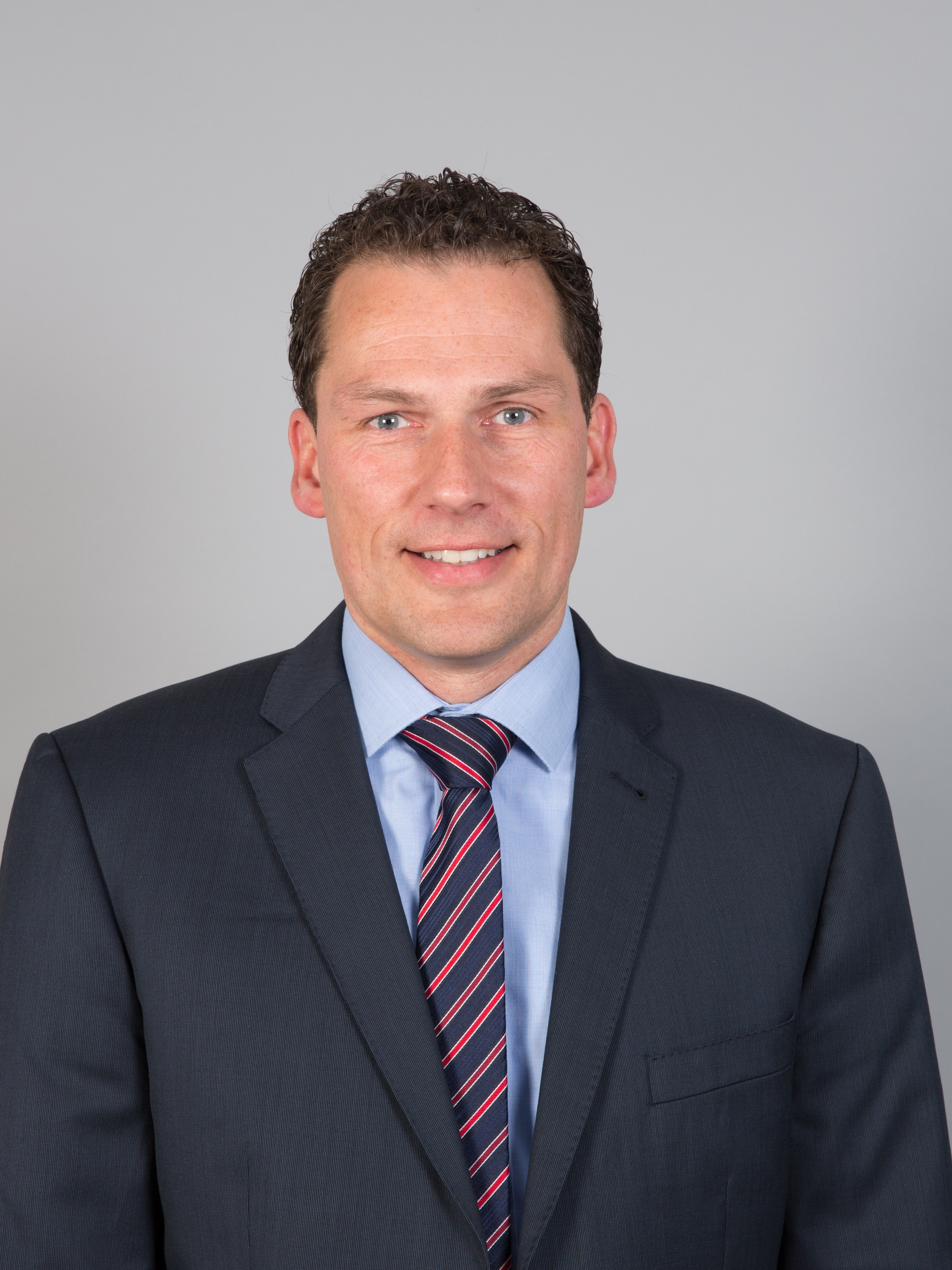
	First party	Second party	Third party
Leader	Jens Böhrnsen	Elisabeth Motschmann	Karoline Linnert
Party	SPD	CDU	Greens
Last election	36 seats, 38.6%	20 seats, 20.4%	21 seats, 22.5%
Seats won	29	20	14
Seat change	▼7	0	▼7
Popular vote	383,509	261,929	176,807
Percentage	32.8%	22.4%	15.1%
Swing	▼5.8%	▲2.0%	▼7.4%
	Fourth party	Fifth party	Sixth party
Leader	Kristina Vogt	Lencke Wischhusen	Christian Schäfer
Party	Left	FDP	AfD
Last election	5 seats, 5.6%	0 seats, 2.4%	Did not exist
Seats won	8	6	4
Seat change	▲3	▲6	▲4
Popular vote	111,485	76,754	64,368
Percentage	9.5%	6.6%	5.5%
Swing	▲3.9%	▲4.2%	New party
	Seventh party
Leader	Jan Timke
Party	Citizens in Rage
Last election	1 seat, 3.7%
Seats won	1
Seat change	0
Popular vote	37,759
Percentage	3.2%
Swing	▼0.5%
Government before election
Third Böhrnsen senate
SPD–Green
Government after election
Sieling senate
SPD–Green

The 2015 Bremen state election was held on 10 May 2015 to elect the members of the Bürgerschaft of Bremen, as well as the city councils of Bremen and Bremerhaven. The incumbent government of the Social Democratic Party (SPD) and The Greens retained its majority. However, Mayor and SPD leader Jens Böhrnsen resigned due to his party's poor performance, which was significantly below expectations. He was succeeded by fellow SPD member Carsten Sieling.

Analysts expressed surprise about the low turnout (just 50.1%), the lowest since 1945 in a west German state, and concern about a particularly low turnout in impoverished areas, which was seen as an indication of disillusionment with politics in these demographics.

== Background ==
Following the election in 2011, the Social Democrats and Greens continued their coalition government from the previous legislative period. The composition changed several times since the last election following the death of Renate Möbius, later Martin Korol took her place in the SPD caucus. He soon after left the party and sat as an independent before joining the Citizens in Rage. For the CDU, Oğuzhan Yazıcı replaced Elisabeth Motschmann when she was elected to the Bundestag. There were personnel changes in the caucus of Alliance '90/The Greens as well.

== Electoral system ==
Each voter may distribute five votes among party lists or candidates within them (cumulative voting and panachage). The state of Bremen consists of two cities, Bremen and Bremerhaven. Of the 83 members of the state legislature, 68 are elected in Bremen, 15 in Bremerhaven. To be allocated seats from either Bremen or Bremerhaven a party must receive 5% of the vote or more in the respective city. In Bremen (but not in Bremerhaven), the same ballot is also used to determine the composition of the city legislature, also consisting of 68 members who in most cases are the same as Bremen's representatives in the state legislature. Differences may, however, arise since EU citizens resident in Bremen who are not also German citizens may vote in city legislature elections but not in state legislature elections. In the 2003 elections, the 2007 elections, and the current election, this led to one or more of Bremen's seats being allocated to different candidates in the state legislature and in the city legislature.

The state government (Senate), the head of state government (President of the Senate), and the heads of the city governments (Mayor) are later elected by the respective legislatures.

All Germans who have lived in Bremen for at least three months prior to the election are eligible to vote. As of the last election, the voting age is 16, the eligibility age 18. Non-German EU citizens resident in Bremen may vote in city legislature elections but not in state legislature elections which for German citizens in Bremen (but not in Bremerhaven) happen with the same votes on the same ballot.

== Parties ==
The table below lists parties represented in the previous Bürgerschaft of Bremen.

Name		Ideology	Leader(s)	2011 result	
Name		Ideology	Leader(s)	Votes (%)	Seats
SPD	Social Democratic Party of Germany; Sozialdemokratische Partei Deutschlands	Social democracy	Jens Böhrnsen	38.6%	36 / 83
CDU	Christian Democratic Union of Germany; Christlich Demokratische Union Deutschlands	Christian democracy	Elisabeth Motschmann	20.4%	20 / 83
Grüne	Alliance 90/The Greens; Bündnis 90/Die Grünen	Green politics	Karoline Linnert	22.5%	21 / 83
Linke	The Left; Die Linke	Democratic socialism	Kristina Vogt	5.6%	5 / 83
BiW	Citizens in Rage; Bürger in Wut	Right-wing populism	Jan Timke	3.7%	1 / 83

== Opinion polls ==
Polling firm	Fieldwork date	Sample size	SPD	Grüne	CDU	Linke	BIW	FDP	AfD	Others	Lead
2015 state election	10 May 2015	–	32.8	15.1	22.4	9.5	3.2	6.6	5.5	4.8	10.4
Forschungsgruppe Wahlen	6–7 May 2015	1,000	36.0	15.0	23.0	8.5	3.0	6.5	5.0	3.0	13
Infratest dimap	28–29 Apr 2015	1,001	37	16	22	8	3	6	5	3	15
Forschungsgruppe Wahlen	27–29 Apr 2015	1,013	37	15	23	9	3	5	5	3	14
INSA	16–20 Apr 2015	500	37	12	25	9	3	6	5	3	12
Infratest dimap	10–14 Apr 2015	1,001	38	16	23	6	3	5	5	4	15
2014 European election	25 May 2014	–	34.4	17.6	22.4	9.6	–	3.3	5.8	6.9	12.0
FGW Telefonfeld	31 Mar–9 Apr 2014	1,002	40	16	28	8	–	–	3	5	12
Emnid	15–25 Jan 2014	1,401	37	17	21	9	–	3	5	8	16
2013 federal election	22 Sep 2013	–	35.6	12.1	29.3	10.1	–	3.4	3.7	5.8	6.3
2011 state election	22 May 2011	–	38.6	22.5	20.4	5.6	3.7	2.4	–	6.9	16.1

== Election result ==
Summary of the 10 May 2015 election results for the Bürgerschaft of Bremen
Party	Votes	%	+/–	Seats			
Party	Votes	%	+/–	Bremen	Bremerhaven	Total seats	+/-
Social Democratic Party (SPD)	383,509	32.82	-5.8	24	6	30	-7
Christian Democratic Union (CDU)	261,929	22.42	+2.0	16	4	20	±0
Alliance 90/The Greens (Grüne)	176,807	15.13	-7.4	12	2	14	-7
The Left (Linke)	111,485	9.54	+3.9	7	1	8	+3
Free Democratic Party (FDP)	76,754	6.57	+4.2	5	1	6	+6
Alternative for Germany (AfD)	64,368	5.51	New	4	0	4	New
Citizens in Rage (BiW)	37,759	3.23	-0.5	0	1	1	±0
Die PARTEI (PARTEI)	21,888	1.87	+1.9	0	0	0	±0
Pirate Party Germany (Piraten)	17,773	1.52	-0.4	0	0	0	±0
Human Environment Animal Protection Party	13,910	1.19	+1.2	0	0	0	±0
National Democratic Party (NPD)	2,170	0.19	-1.4	0	0	0	±0
Total	1,168,352	100.00	–	68	15	83	0

Popular Vote
SPD	32.83%
CDU	22.42%
B'90/GRÜNE	15.13%
DIE LINKE	9.54%
FDP	6.57%
AfD	5.51%
BiW	3.23%
Other	4.77%

Bürgerschaft seats
SPD	36.14%
CDU	24.10%
B'90/GRÜNE	16.87%
DIE LINKE	9.64%
FDP	7.23%
AfD	4.82%
BiW	1.20%
