= Sieling senate =

Senate of Carsten Sieling Senate Sieling
- 24th Senate of Bremen
- 15 July 2015 – 14 August 2019
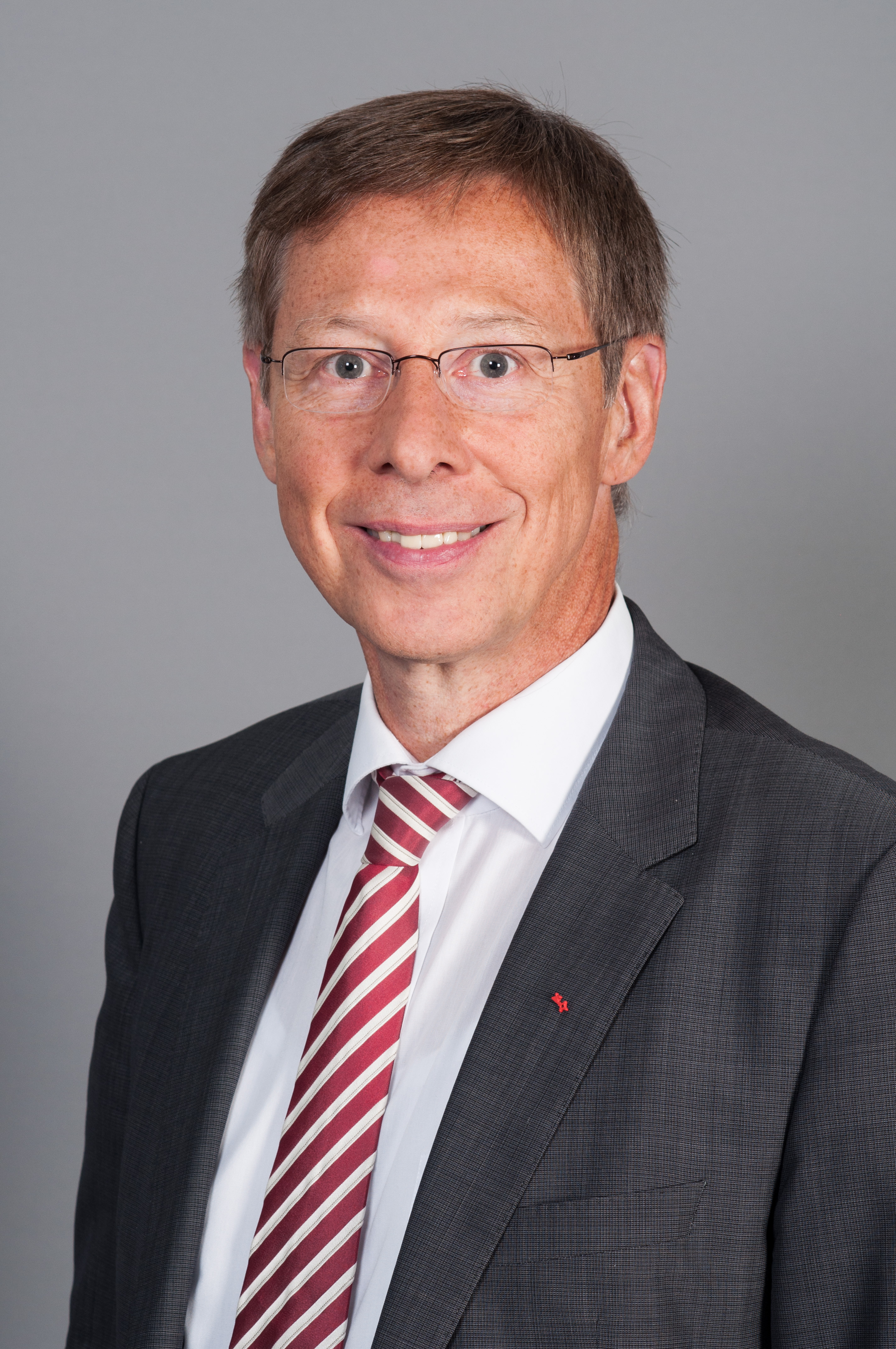
- Carsten Sieling in September 2014
- Date formed: 15 July 2015
- Date dissolved: 14 August 2019

People and organisations
- Mayor: Carsten Sieling
- Deputy Mayor: Karoline Linnert
- No. of ministers: 8
- Member parties: Social Democratic Party; Alliance 90/The Greens; The Left
- Status in legislature: Coalition government (Majority); 44 / 83 (53%)
- Opposition parties: Christian Democratic Union; The Left; Free Democratic Party; Alternative for Germany; Citizens in Rage

History
- Election: 2015 Bremen state election
- Legislature term: 19th Bürgerschaft of Bremen
- Predecessor: Third Böhrnsen senate
- Successor: Bovenschulte senate

The Sieling Senate was the state government of Bremen between 2015 and 2019, sworn in on 15 July 2015 after Carsten Sieling was elected as Mayor by the members of the Bürgerschaft of Bremen. It was the 24th Senate of Bremen.

It was formed after the 2015 Bremen state election by the Social Democratic Party (SPD) and Alliance 90/The Greens (GRÜNE). Excluding the Mayor, the senate comprised eight ministers, called Senators. Five were members of the SPD and three were members of the Greens.

The Sieling senate was succeeded by the Bovenschulte senate on 15 August 2019.

== Formation ==
The previous Senate was a coalition government of the SPD and Greens led by Mayor Jens Böhrnsen of the SPD.

The election took place on 10 May 2015, and resulted in substantial losses for both governing parties. The opposition CDU recorded a small improvement, and The Left made modest gains. The FDP re-entered the Bürgerschaft with 7%, while the AfD debuted at 6%. BiW retained their single seat in Bremerhaven.

Overall, the incumbent coalition retained its majority. The day after the election, however, Mayor Böhrnsen announced that he would step down as Mayor, taking responsibility for the SPD's unexpectedly severe losses. Former state parliamentary leader Carsten Sieling, who was a member of the Bundestag at the time of the election, was nominated as his successor on 18 May. He was approved by the SPD congress on 2 June.

Exploratory talks between the SPD and Greens to renew their governing coalition began on 27 May. Formal negotiations began the next week and concluded on 27 June. The congresses of both parties approved the coalition agreement on 11 June, with the SPD voting around 90% in favour and the Greens 85%.

Carsten Sieling was elected Mayor by the Bürgerschaft on 15 July, winning 46 votes out of 82 cast.

== Composition ==
The composition of the cabinet at the time of its dissolution was as follows:

Portfolio	Senator	Party	Took office	Left office	State secretaries
President of the Senate and Mayor; Senator for Religious Affairs	Carsten Sieling born 13 January 1959 (age 67)	SPD	15 July 2015	14 August 2019	Olaf Joachim; Carmen Emigholz
Deputy President of the Senate and Mayor; Senator for Finance; Senate Commissioner for Data Protection	Karoline Linnert born 30 August 1958 (age 67)	GRÜNE	15 July 2015	14 August 2019	Dietmar Strehl; Hans-Henning Lühr
Senator for Interior	Ulrich Mäurer born 14 July 1951 (age 74)	SPD	15 July 2015	14 August 2019	Thomas Ehmke
Senator for Justice and Constitution; Senator for Economics, Labour and Harbours	Martin Günthner born 25 January 1976 (age 50)	SPD	15 July 2015	14 August 2019	Jörg Schulz; Ekkehart Siering
Senator for Children and Education	Claudia Bogedan born 7 April 1975 (age 50)	SPD	15 July 2015	14 August 2019	Frank Pietrzok
Senator for Social Affairs, Youth, Integration and Sport; Senate Commissioner for the Fulfilment of Women's Equality	Anja Stahmann born 30 June 1967 (age 58)	GRÜNE	15 July 2015	14 August 2019	Jan Fries
Senator for Environment, Construction and Transport	Joachim Lohse born 30 December 1958 (age 67)	GRÜNE	15 July 2015	14 August 2019	Ronny Meyer
Senator for Science, Health and Consumer Protection	Eva Quante-Brandt born 13 January 1960 (age 66)	SPD	15 July 2015	14 August 2019	Gerd-Rüdiger Kück
State Councillor for Europe and Development Cooperation; Representative to the Federal Government	Ulrike Hiller born 11 June 1965 (age 60)	SPD	15 July 2015	14 August 2019	
