= First Bovenschulte senate =

State government of Bremen

Senate of Andreas Bovenschulte Senate Bovenschulte
- 25th Senate of Bremen
- 15 August 2019 – 5 July 2023
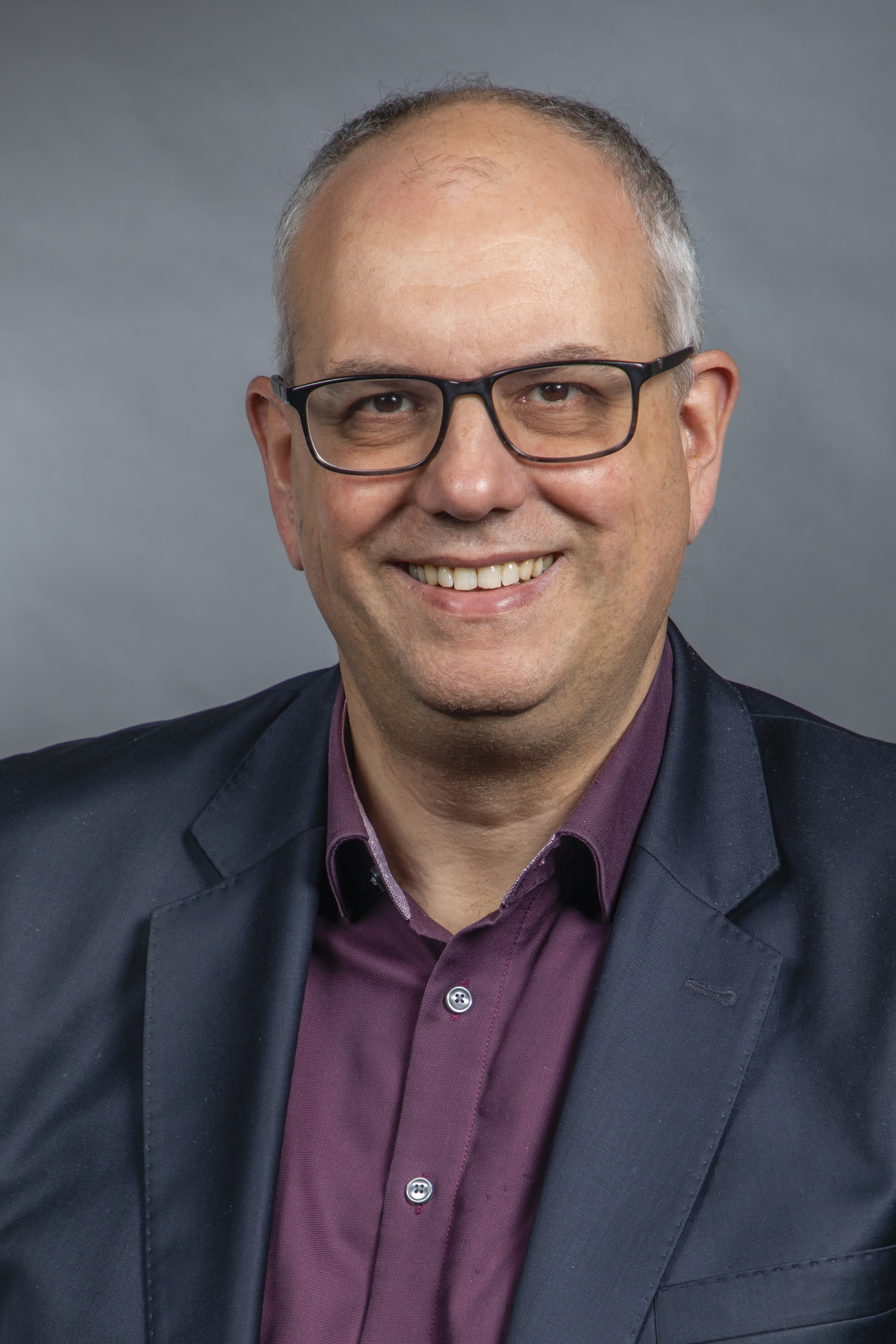
- Andreas Bovenschulte in December 2019
- Date formed: 15 August 2019
- Date dissolved: 5 July 2023

People and organisations
- Mayor: Andreas Bovenschulte
- Deputy Mayor: Maike Schaefer
- No. of ministers: 8
- Member parties: Social Democratic Party; Alliance 90/The Greens; The Left
- Status in legislature: Coalition government (Majority); 49 / 87 (56%)
- Opposition parties: Christian Democratic Union; Alternative for Germany; Free Democratic Party; Citizens in Rage

History
- Election: 2019 Bremen state election
- Legislature term: 20th Bürgerschaft of Bremen
- Predecessor: Sieling senate
- Successor: Second Bovenschulte senate

The First Bovenschulte senate was the state government of Bremen from 2019 to 2023, sworn in on 15 August 2019 after Andreas Bovenschulte was elected as Mayor by the members of the Bürgerschaft of Bremen. It was the 25th Senate of Bremen.

It was formed after the 2019 Bremen state election by the Social Democratic Party (SPD), Alliance 90/The Greens (GRÜNE), and The Left (LINKE), and was the first government in a former West German state to include the Left party. Excluding the Mayor, the senate comprised eight ministers, called Senators. Three were members of the SPD, three were members of the Greens, and two were members of The Left.

== Formation ==
The previous Senate was a coalition government of the SPD and Greens led by Mayor Carsten Sieling of the SPD.

The election took place on 26 May 2019, and resulted in substantial losses for the SPD and an improvement for the Greens. The opposition CDU narrowly surpassed the SPD to become the largest party for the first time in the state's history. The Left recorded a small swing, while the AfD and FDP remained steady on 6% each. BiW retained their single seat in Bremerhaven.

After the election, CDU leader Carsten Meyer-Heder said, that he hoped to become Mayor in a coalition with the Greens and FDP, while the SPD and Left called for a coalition between the Greens and their two parties. The Greens stated that they were open to both possibilities.

After holding consultations with various parties, the Greens announced on 5 June that they would seek a coalition with the SPD and Left. Negotiations between the three parties began on 12 June. They finalised their coalition agreement on 1 July.

On the same day, Carsten Sieling announced that, due to the losses suffered by the SPD in the election, he would not stand for re-election as Mayor. On 6 July, the SPD state congress nominated Andreas Bovenschulte, who had been elected as parliamentary group leader the previous week, as Sieling's successor with 140 votes out of 146. The SPD, Greens, and Left officially signed the coalition agreement on 13 August.

Bovenschulte was elected Mayor by the Bürgerschaft on 15 August, winning 47 votes out of 82 cast.

== Composition ==
Portfolio	Senator	Party	Took office	Left office	State secretaries
President of the Senate and Mayor; Senator for Religious Affairs; Senator for Culture	Andreas Bovenschulte born 11 August 1965 (age 60)	SPD	15 August 2019	4 July 2023	Thomas Emke (Head of the Senate Chancellery); Olaf Joachim (Federal, Media, Development Cooperation, and Int'l Affairs, Representative to the Federal Government); Carmen Emigholz (Culture)
Mayor; Senator for Climate Protection, Environment, Mobility, Urban Development and Housing Construction	Maike Schaefer born 2 June 1971 (age 54)	GRÜNE	15 August 2019	4 July 2023	Ronny Meyer (Climate Protection, Environment and Mobility); Gabriele Nießen (Urban Development, Housing Construction and Central Affairs)
Senator for Health, Women and Consumer Protection; Senate Commissioner for the Fulfilment of Women's Equality	Claudia Bernhard born 9 February 1961 (age 65)	LINKE	15 August 2019	4 July 2023	Silke Stroth
Senator for Finance; Senate Commissioner for Data Protection	Dietmar Strehl born 24 May 1956 (age 69)	GRÜNE	15 August 2019	4 July 2023	Silke Krebs; Martin Hagen
Senator for Interior	Ulrich Mäurer born 14 July 1951 (age 74)	SPD	15 August 2019	4 July 2023	Olaf Bull
Senator for Justice and Constitution; Senator for Science and Harbours	Claudia Schilling born 13 June 1968 (age 57)	SPD	15 August 2019	4 July 2023	Björn Tschöpe (Justice and Constitution); Tim Cordßen-Ryglewski (Science and Harbours)
Senator for Children and Education	Claudia Bogedan born 7 April 1975 (age 50)	SPD	15 August 2019	7 July 2021	Arnhild Moning
Senator for Children and Education	Sascha Karolin Aulepp born 24 September 1970 (age 55)	SPD	7 July 2021	4 July 2023	Regine Komoss
Senator for Social Affairs, Youth, Integration and Sport	Anja Stahmann born 30 June 1967 (age 58)	GRÜNE	15 August 2019	4 July 2023	Jan Fries
Senator for Economics, Labour and Europe	Kristina Vogt born 3 June 1965 (age 60)	LINKE	15 August 2019	4 July 2023	Kai Stührenberg (Labour and Europe); Sven Wiebe (Economics)
