= Piet Leidreiter =

German politician (born 1965)

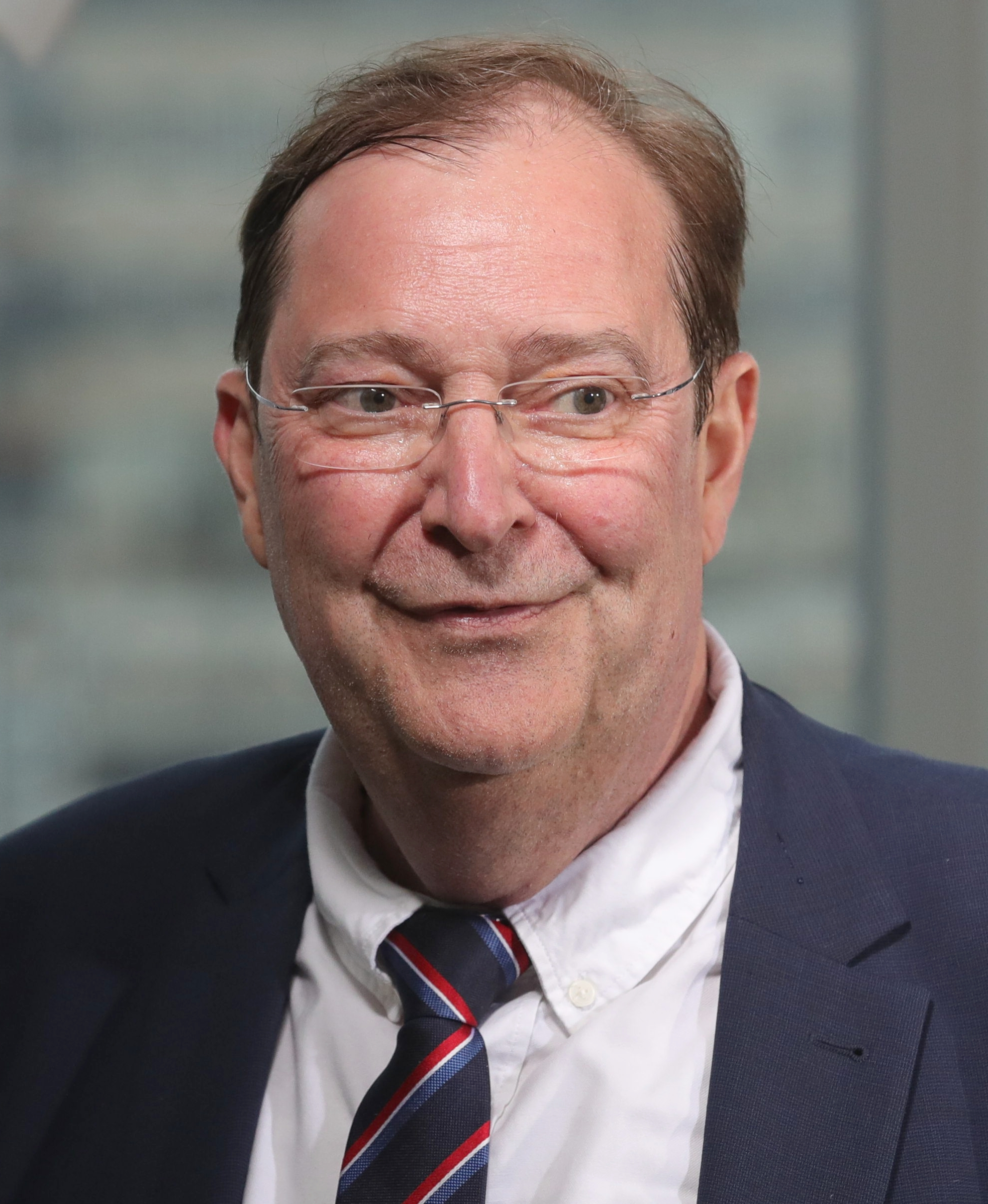
- Piet Leidreiter in 2023

Member of the Bürgerschaft of Bremen
- Incumbent
- Assumed office 2023
- In office 2015–2019

Personal details
- Born: 2 February 1965 (age 61) Bremen, West Germany
- Party: Citizens in Rage (since 2017)
- Other political affiliations: ALFA (2015–2017); AfD (2013–2015)

Piet Leidreiter (born 2 February 1965) is a German politician. He was federal treasurer of Alternative for Germany until 2015. He was a founding member of the Liberal Conservative Reformers (ALFA) party and was a member of the Bremen Parliament from 2015 to 2019. Since 12 June 2017, he has been a member of the voters' association Citizens in Rage (BIW).

== Biography ==
=== Family, education and career ===
Leidreiter was born in Bremen. After graduating from high school and vocational training as a tax clerk, Leidreiter studied business administration with a legal focus. He is a senior executive in the family's tax consultancy firm.

He is married, has one daughter and lives in Bremen-Mitte.

=== Politics ===
Leidreiter joined the Alternative for Germany (AfD) party in 2013 and was a founding member of the Bremen state association. At the founding meeting, he was elected state treasurer of the Bremen state association. At the member party conference in Erfurt in 2014, he was elected treasurer of the federal association. The AfD Goldshop was set up under the direction of Leidreiter, which brought into the party millions of euros of donations for the AfD from entrepreneurial activities.

In the May 2015 Bremen state election, Leidreiter was elected to the state parliament.

In July 2015, after the AfD federal party conference in Essen, he left the party. In the same month, he took part in founding the Alliance for Progress and Awakening (ALFA) party. In the Bremen Parliament he belonged to the group ALFA-Group-Bremen, which was named Bremer Bürgerliche Reformer between 13 and 28 July 2015 and before that was the group of the AfD. In the parliamentary ALFA Group Bremen he was deputy chairman and parliamentary managing director. Leidreiter was a member of the budget and finance committee and a deputy member of the deputation for business, labor and ports. At the inaugural meeting of the ALFA state association in Bremen in September 2015, Leidreiter was elected its state treasurer. In November 2016, the Alliance for Progress and Awakening changed its name to the Liberal-Conservative Reformer (LKR) after a lost name dispute.

In June 2017, Leidreiter, together with Klaus Remkes, declared the transition to the right-wing conservative and right-wing populist party Citizens in Rage. Jan Timke, Piet Leidreiter and Klaus Remkes formed the parliamentary group BIW in the Bremen Parliament until 2019. At the beginning of 2019, Leidreiter was elected Deputy Federal Chairman and Deputy Bremen State Chairman of the BIW.

He lost his seat in the 2019 Bremen state election.

In 2019, Leidreiter was elected to the advisory board of the Horn-Lehe district of Bremen.

In April 2023 he claimed that Bremen was a "crime stronghold". He was referring to crime statistics from Interior Senator Ulrich Mäurer, according to which more than 66,000 crimes were committed in 2022 and the increase was 3,000 compared to the previous year 2021. However, the figures refer to the state of Bremen, including Bremerhaven.

He was the lead candidate for his party at the 2023 Bremen state election, in which BIW achieved their best-ever result with 9.4% also gaining 9 seats.
