= 2011 Bremen state election =

State election in Bremen, Germany

- 22 May 2011

All 83 seats in the Bürgerschaft of Bremen 42 seats needed for a majority
- Turnout: 1,309,355 (55.5%) ▼2.1%
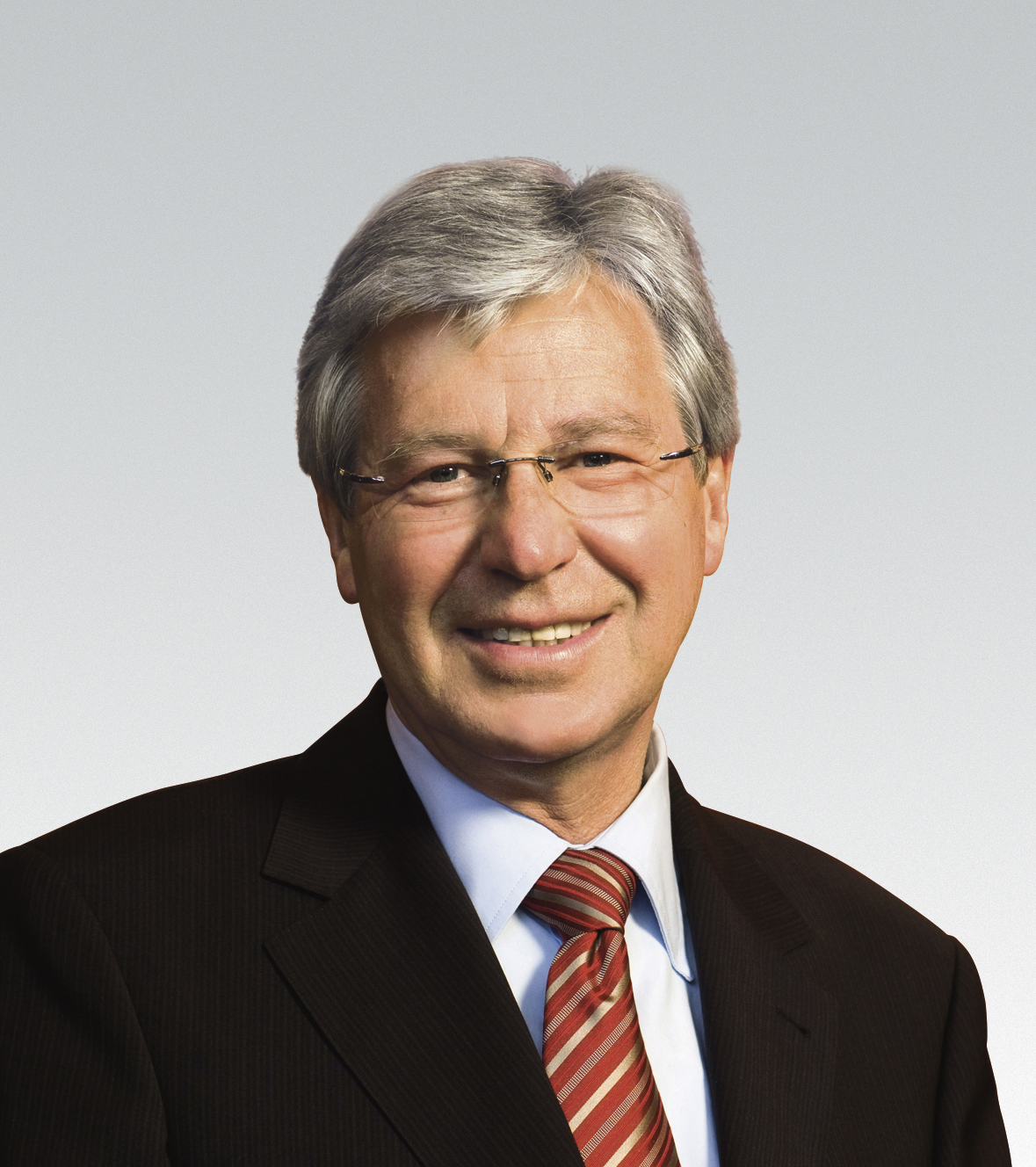

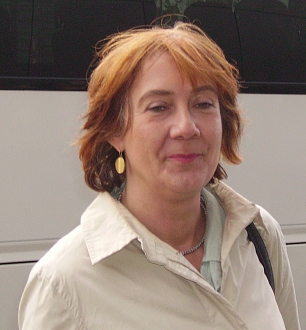

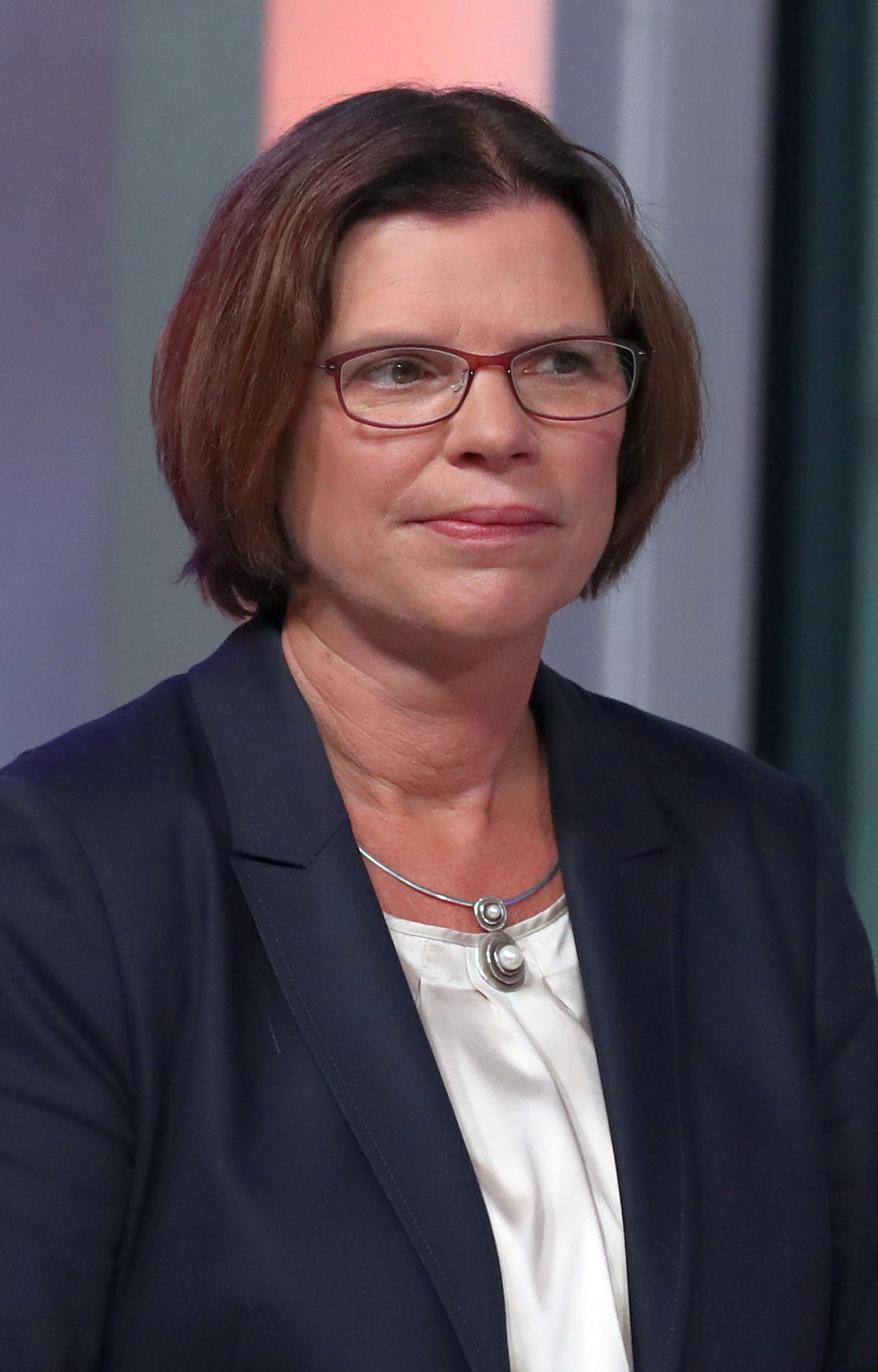

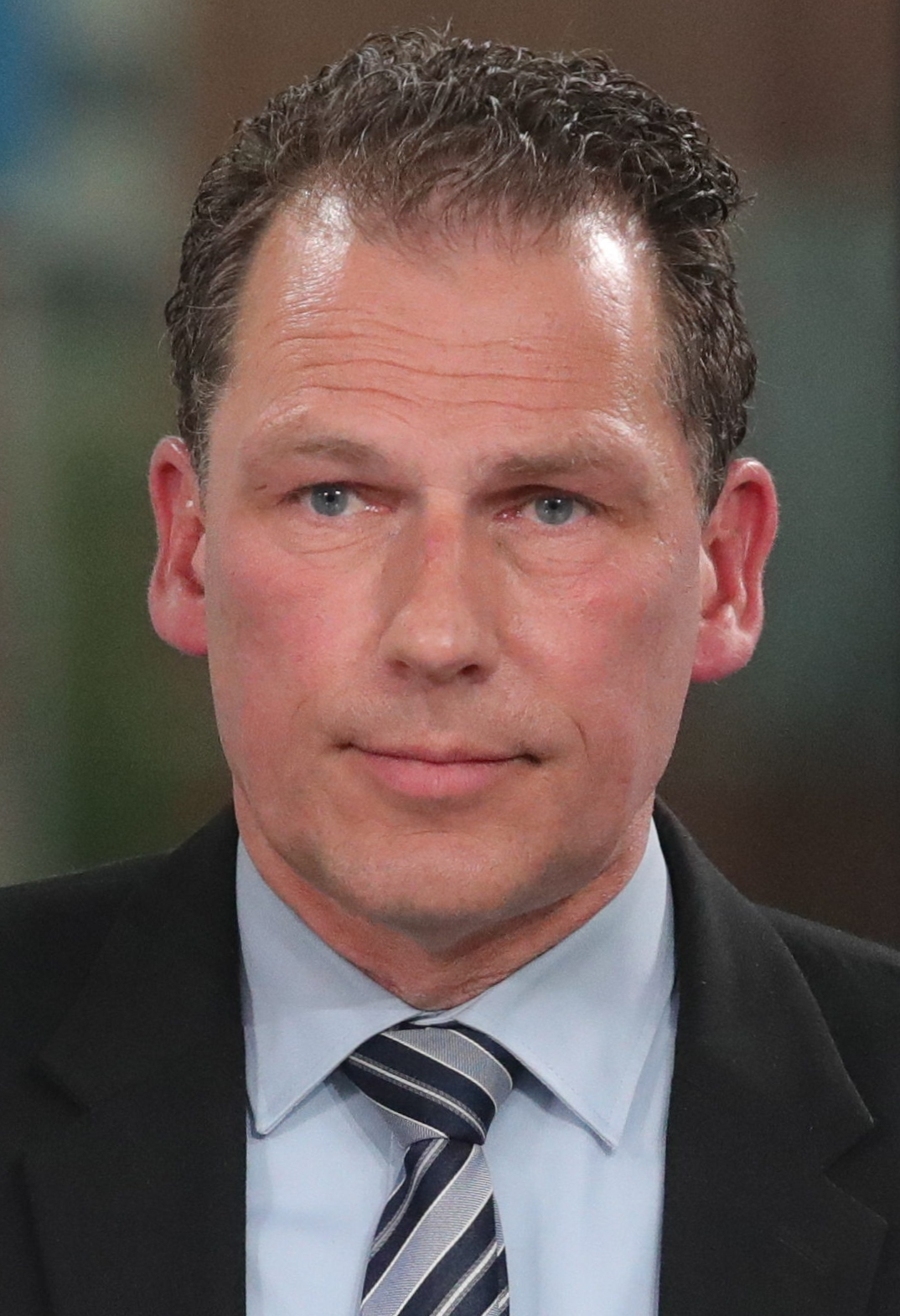
	First party	Second party	Third party
Leader	Jens Böhrnsen	Karoline Linnert	Rita Mohr-Lüllmann
Party	SPD	Greens	CDU
Last election	32 seats, 36.7%	14 seats, 16.5%	23 seats, 25.6%
Seats won	36	21	20
Seat change	▲4	▲7	▼3
Popular vote	505,348	293,993	266,483
Percentage	38.6%	22.5%	20.4%
Swing	▲1.9%	▲6.0%	▼5.2%
	Fourth party	Fifth party	Sixth party
Leader	Kristina Vogt	Jan Timke	Oliver Möllenstädt
Party	Left	Citizens in Rage	FDP
Last election	7 seats, 8.4%	1 seat, 0.8%	5 seats, 6.0%
Seats won	5	1	0
Seat change	▼2	0	▼5
Popular vote	73,769	48,530	31,176
Percentage	5.6%	3.7%	2.4%
Swing	▼2.8%	▲2.9%	▼3.6%
Mayor before election
Jens Böhrnsen
SPD
Elected Mayor
Jens Böhrnsen
SPD

The 2011 Bremen state election was held on 22 May 2011 to elect the members of the Bürgerschaft of Bremen, as well as the city councils of Bremen and Bremerhaven. The incumbent government of the Social Democratic Party (SPD) and The Greens was re-elected with an increased majority. The Greens became the second-largest party in a state legislature for the second time after the 2011 Baden-Württemberg state election on 27 March.

Sixteen and seventeen year olds were able to vote for the first time in this election. A reform to the electoral system came into effect in this election, based on an open list system, with each voter having five votes to distribute freely between parties and candidates.

== Parties ==
The table below lists parties represented in the previous Bürgerschaft of Bremen.

Name		Ideology	Leader(s)	2007 result	
Name		Ideology	Leader(s)	Votes (%)	Seats
SPD	Social Democratic Party of Germany; Sozialdemokratische Partei Deutschlands	Social democracy	Jens Böhrnsen	36.7%	32 / 83
CDU	Christian Democratic Union of Germany; Christlich Demokratische Union Deutschlands	Christian democracy	Rita Mohr-Lüllmann	25.6%	23 / 83
Grüne	Alliance 90/The Greens; Bündnis 90/Die Grünen	Green politics	Karoline Linnert	16.5%	14 / 83
Linke	The Left; Die Linke	Democratic socialism	Kristina Vogt	8.4%	7 / 83
FDP	Free Democratic Party; Freie Demokratische Partei	Classical liberalism	Oliver Möllenstädt	6.0%	5 / 83
NPD	National Democratic Party of Germany; Nationaldemokratische Partei Deutschlands	Neo-Nazism		2.7% (Note: Results for the German People's Union, which merged with the NPD in January 2011.)	1 / 83
BiW	Citizens in Rage; Bürger in Wut	Right-wing populism	Jan Timke	0.8%	1 / 83

== Opinion polling ==
Polling firm	Fieldwork date	Sample size	SPD	CDU	Grüne	Linke	FDP	BiW	Others	Lead
2011 state election	22 May 2011	–	38.6	20.4	22.5	5.6	2.4	3.7	6.9	16.1
Forschungsgruppe Wahlen	10–12 May 2011	1,037	37	19	24	6	4	–	7	13
Infratest dimap	10–12 May 2011	1,001	36	20	24	7	3	3	7	12
Emnid	20–28 Apr 2011	1,004	37	22	24	7	4	–	6	13
Forsa	Jan–Feb 2011	1,308	38	23	22	7	4	–	6	15
Konkret Marktforschung	17–19 Dec 2010	500	33.4	22.8	19.4	8.5	3.3	5.5	7.1	10.6
Emnid	12–17 Feb 2010	1,000	35	25	17	11	5	–	7	10
2007 state election	13 May 2007	–	36.7	25.6	16.5	8.4	6.0	0.8	5.9	11.1

== Election result ==
Summary of the 22 May 2011 election results for the Bürgerschaft of Bremen
Party	Votes	%	+/–	Seats			
Party	Votes	%	+/–	Bremen	Bremerhaven	Total Seats	+/-
Social Democratic Party (SPD)	505,348	38.60	+1.9	30	6	36	+4
Alliance 90/The Greens (Grüne)	293,993	22.46	+6.0	17	4	21	+7
Christian Democratic Union (CDU)	266,483	20.35	-5.2	16	4	20	-3
The Left (Linke)	73,769	5.63	-2.8	5	0	5	-2
Citizens in Rage (BiW)	48,530	3.71	+2.9	0	1	1	±0
Free Democratic Party (FDP)	31,176	2.38	-3.6	0	0	0	-5
Pirate Party (Piraten)	24,935	1.90	+1.9	0	0	0	±0
National Democratic Party (NDP)	20,470	1.56	-1.1	0	0	0	±0
Others	44,541	3.40		0	0	0	±0
Total	1,309,245	100.00	–	68	15	83	0

Popular Vote
SPD	38.60%
B'90/GRÜNE	22.45%
CDU	20.35%
DIE LINKE	5.63%
BiW	3.71%
FDP	2.38%
Other	6.88%

Bürgerschaft seats
SPD	43.37%
B'90/GRÜNE	25.30%
CDU	24.10%
DIE LINKE	6.02%
BiW	1.20%
