= Anja Stahmann =

German politician (born 1967)

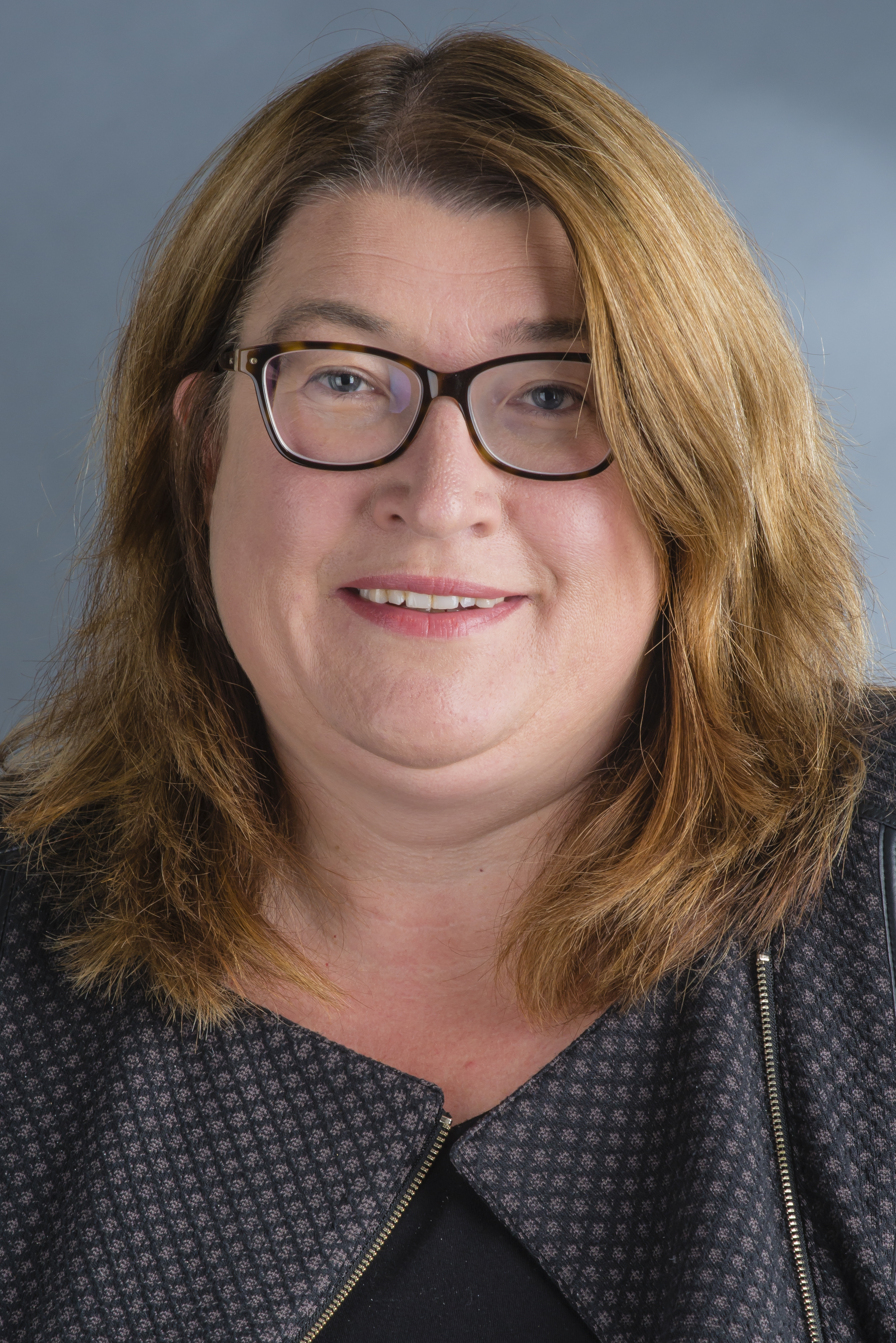
- Stahmann in 2015

Senator for Social Affairs and Youth of Bremen
- In office 30 June 2011 – 5 July 2023
- President: Jens Böhrnsen; Carsten Sieling; Andreas Bovenschulte
- Preceded by: Ingelore Rosenkötter
- Succeeded by: Claudia Schilling

Personal details
- Born: 30 June 1967 (age 58)
- Party: Alliance 90/The Greens (since 1999)

Anja Stahmann (born 30 June 1967) is a German politician. From 2011 to 2023, she served as senator for social affairs and youth of Bremen. From 1999 to 2011, she was a member of the Bürgerschaft of Bremen.
