= Sascha Karolin Aulepp =

German politician

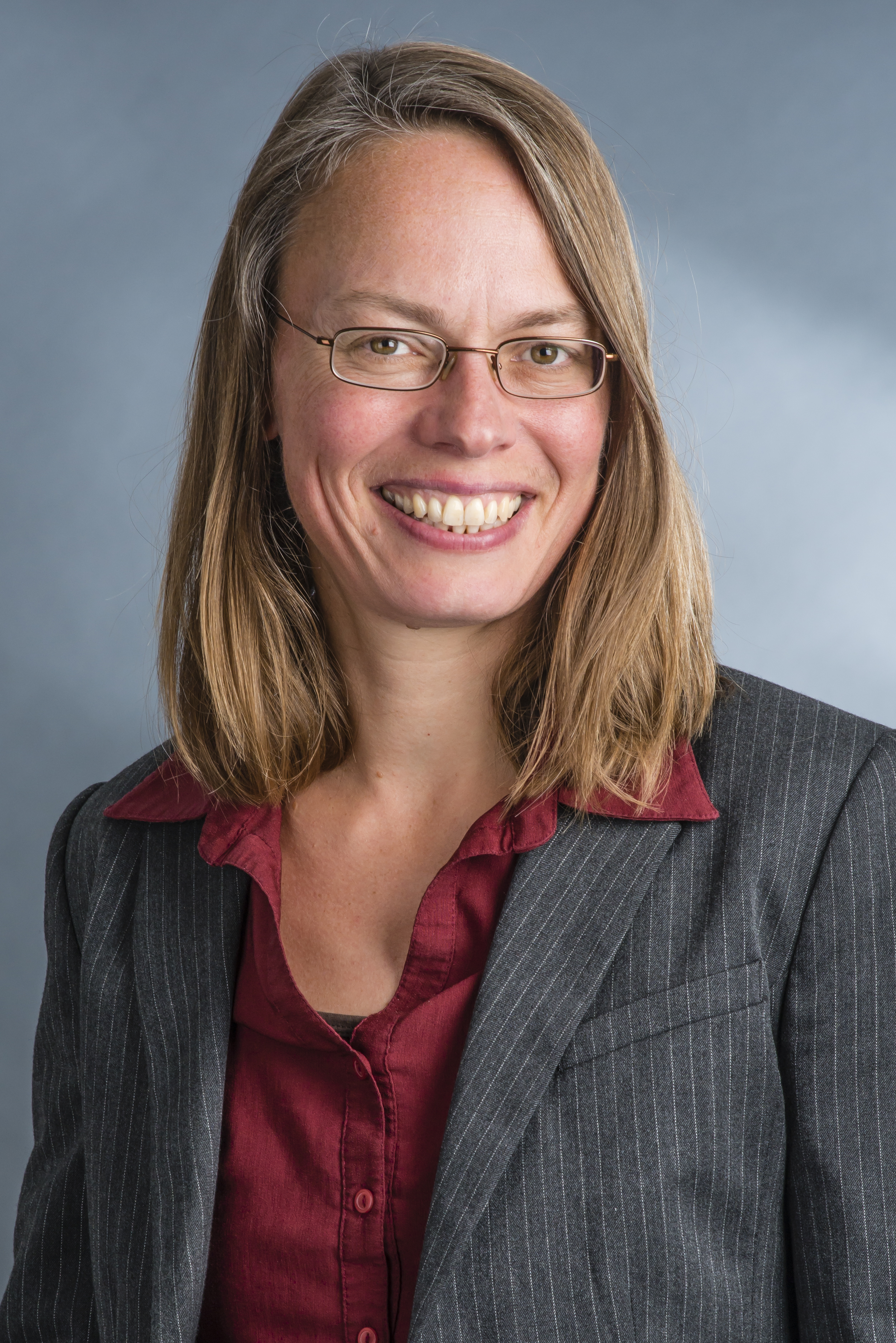
Sascha Karolin Aulepp, 2015

Sascha Karolin Aulepp (born 24 September 1970) is a German judge and politician of the Social Democratic Party (SPD) who has been serving as State Minister for Children and Education in the government of Mayor Andreas Bovenschulte since 2021.

== Early life and career ==
Aulepp was born in 1970 in Hanau and studied jurisprudence, and became an attorney at law in 2001.

== Political career ==
In 2015, Aulepp succeeded Sarah Ryglewski as a member of the State Parliament of Bremen. In parliament, she served as her parliamentary group's spokesperson on legal affairs and chaired the Committee on Legal Affairs. From 2016 to 2021, she served as the chairperson of the SPD in Bremen.

Aulepp is serving as State Minister for Children and Education in the government of Mayor Andreas Bovenschulte since 2021. State Minister for Children and Education in the government of Mayor Andreas Bovenschulte since 2021.

== Politics ==
In 2024 Aulepp announced plans to lower qualification standards for kindergarten care staff in order to attract more staff to the facilities. The Ver.di rejected Aulepp's plans and demonstrated against it.

== Other activities ==
- Stiftung Lesen, Member of the Board of Trustees
- German United Services Trade Union (ver.di), Member
