= Oğuzhan Yazıcı =

German politician (born 1977)

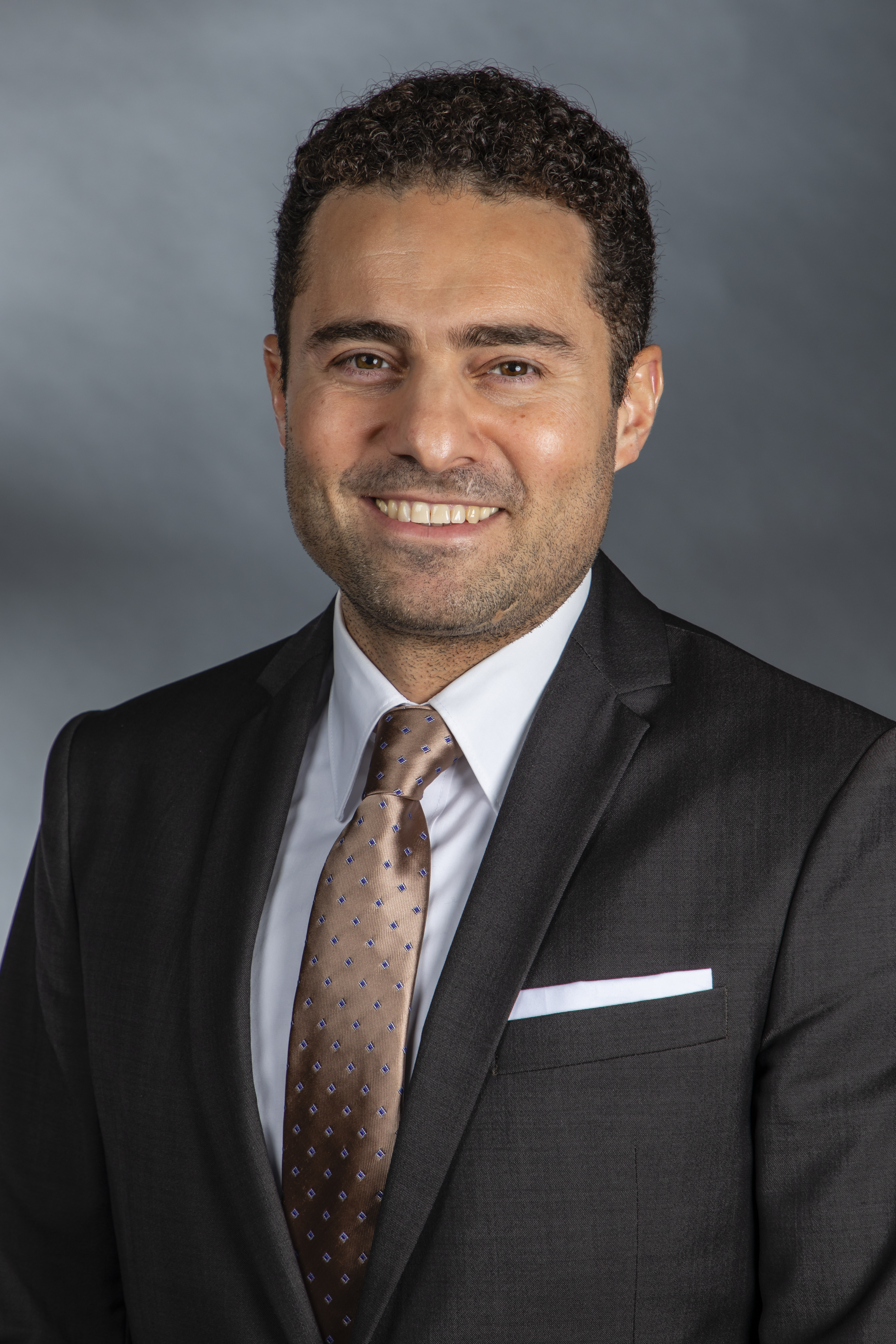
- Yazıcı in 2019

Member of the Bürgerschaft of Bremen
- Incumbent
- Assumed office 18 October 2013
- Preceded by: Elisabeth Motschmann

Personal details
- Born: 22 October 1977 (age 48) Hattingen
- Party: Christian Democratic Union (since 2010)

Oğuzhan Yazıcı (born 22 October 1977 in Hattingen) is a German politician serving as a member of the Bürgerschaft of Bremen since 2013. He has served as chairman of the Kommunalpolitische Vereinigung of the Christian Democratic Union in Bremen since 2015.
