= 2007 Bremen state election =

State election in Bremen, Germany

- 13 May 2007

All 83 seats in the Bürgerschaft of Bremen 42 seats needed for a majority
- Turnout: 275,816 (57.6%) ▼3.7%
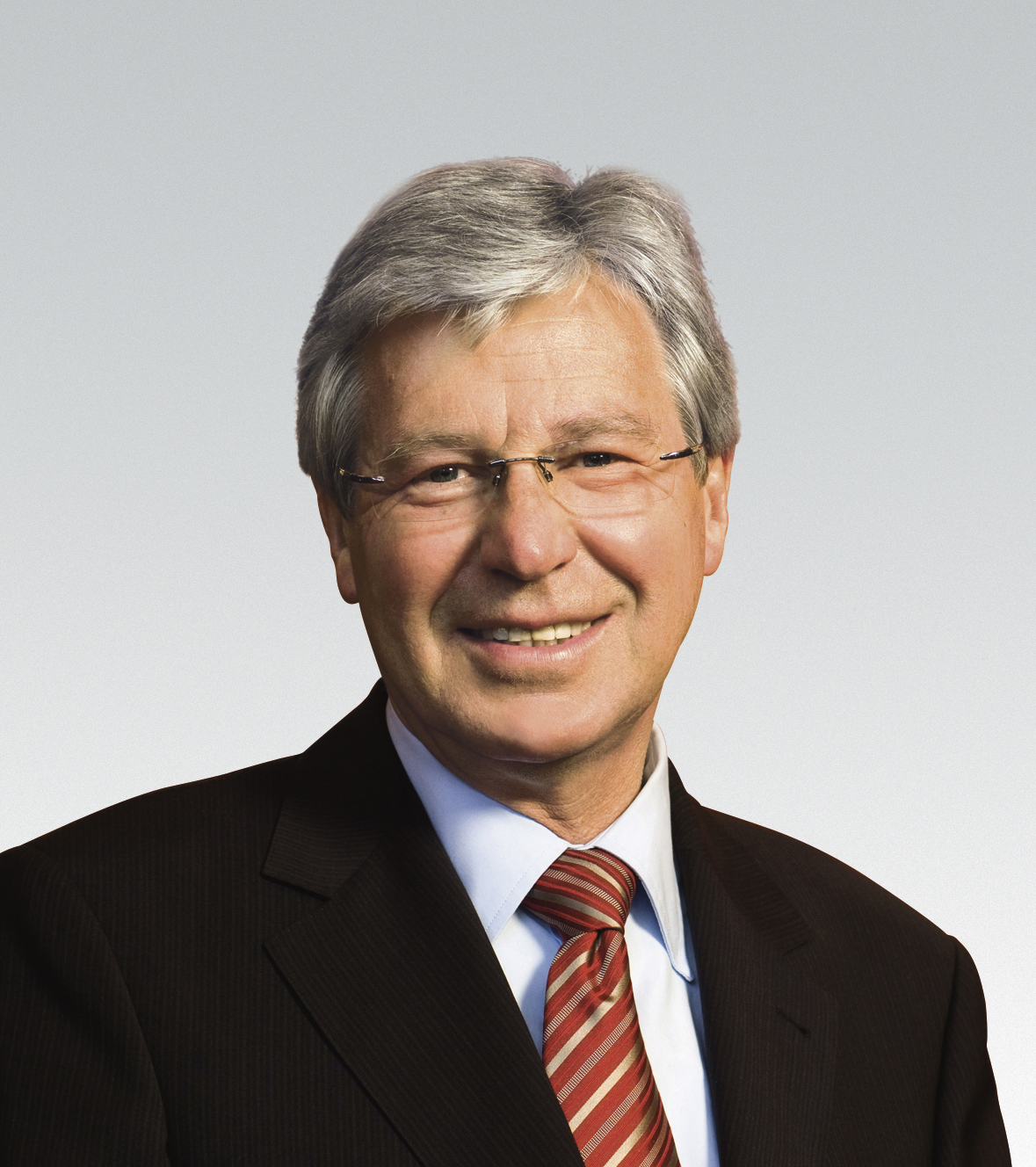

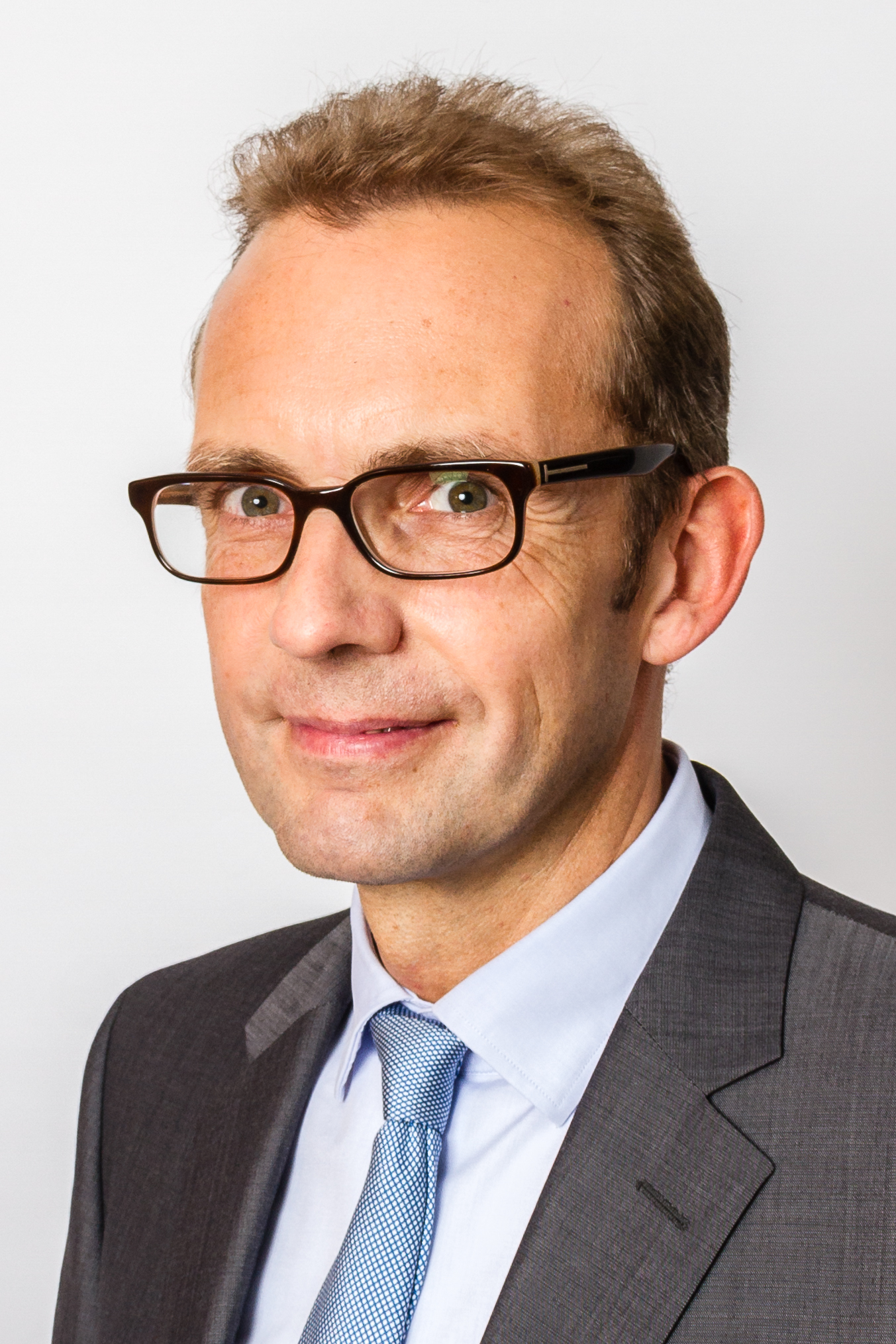

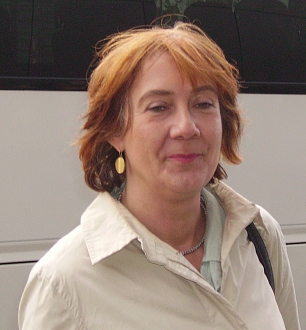

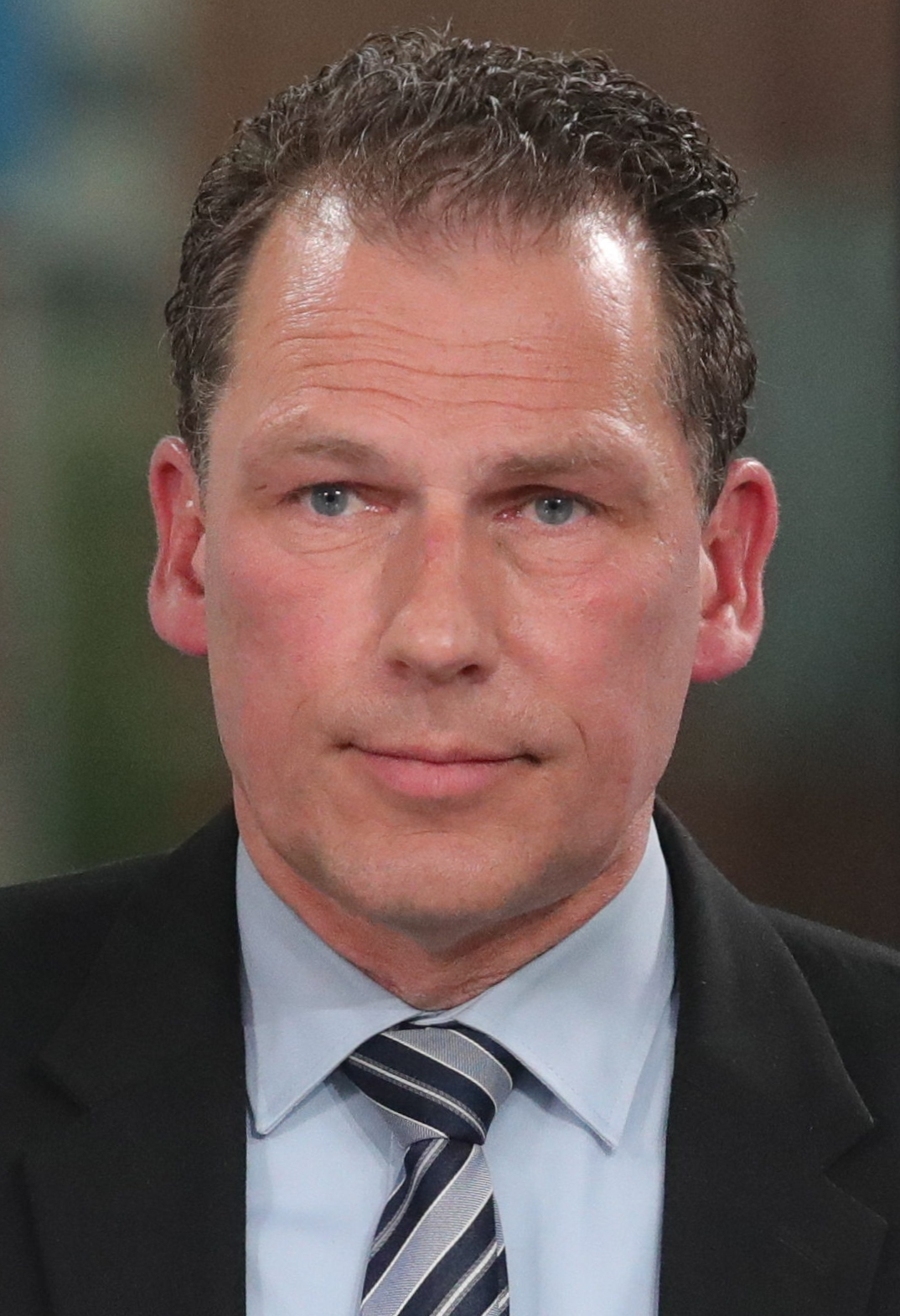
	First party	Second party	Third party
Leader	Jens Böhrnsen	Thomas Röwekamp	Karoline Linnert
Party	SPD	CDU	Greens
Last election	40 seats, 42.3%	29 seats, 29.8%	12 seats, 12.8%
Seats won	32	23	14
Seat change	▼8	▼6	▲2
Popular vote	101,290	70,728	45,493
Percentage	36.7%	25.6%	16.5%
Swing	▼5.6%	▼4.2%	▲3.7%
	Fourth party	Fifth party	Sixth party
Leader	Peter Erlanson	Magnus Buhlert	Siegfried Tittmann
Party	Left	FDP	DVU
Last election	0 seats, 1.7% (Note: Results for PDS)	1 seat, 4.2%	1 seat, 2.3%
Seats won	7	5	1
Seat change	▲7	▲4	0
Popular vote	23,382	16,486	7,536
Percentage	8.4%	6.0%	2.7%
Swing	▲6.7%	▲1.8%	▲0.4%
	Seventh party
Leader	Jan Timke
Party	Citizens in Rage
Last election	0 seats, 4.4% (Note: Results for PRO)
Seats won	1
Seat change	▲1
Popular vote	2,336
Percentage	0.8%
Swing	▼3.6%
Mayor before election
Jens Böhrnsen
SPD
Elected Mayor
Jens Böhrnsen
SPD

The 2007 Bremen state election was held on 13 May 2007 to elect the members of the Bürgerschaft of Bremen, as well as the city councils of Bremen and Bremerhaven. The incumbent government of the Social Democratic Party (SPD) and Christian Democratic Union (CDU) retained its majority with losses. However, the SPD chose to form a new government with The Greens. Jens Böhrnsen was re-elected as Mayor.

This was the first election contested by The Left after the merger of the PDS and WASG. The new party achieved 8.4% of the vote, up from 1.7% for PDS in 2003, marking its first major success in a western state.

== Parties ==
The table below lists parties represented in the previous Bürgerschaft of Bremen.

Name		Ideology	Leader(s)	2003 result	
Name		Ideology	Leader(s)	Votes (%)	Seats
SPD	Social Democratic Party of Germany; Sozialdemokratische Partei Deutschlands	Social democracy	Jens Böhrnsen	42.3%	40 / 83
CDU	Christian Democratic Union of Germany; Christlich Demokratische Union Deutschlands	Christian democracy	Thomas Röwekamp	29.8%	29 / 83
Grüne	Alliance 90/The Greens; Bündnis 90/Die Grünen	Green politics	Karoline Linnert	12.8%	12 / 83
FDP	Free Democratic Party; Freie Demokratische Partei	Classical liberalism	Magnus Bulhert	4.2%	1 / 83
DVU	German People's Union; Deutsche Volksunion	German nationalism	Siegfried Tittmann	2.3%	1 / 83

== Opinion polling ==
Polling firm	Fieldwork date	Sample size	SPD	CDU	Grüne	FDP	DVU	Linke	Others	Lead
2007 state election	13 May 2007	–	36.7	25.6	16.5	6.0	2.7	8.4	4.0	11.1
Forschungsgruppe Wahlen	30 Apr–3 May 2007	1,036	40	28	14	6	4	4.5	3.5	12
Infratest dimap	23–25 Apr 2007	1,000	42	26	14.5	5	2	5.5	5	16
Emnid	14–22 Feb 2005	1,400	38	28	16	6	3	4	5	10
2003 state election	25 May 2003	–	42.3	29.8	12.8	4.2	2.3	1.7	6.9	12.5

== Election result ==
Summary of the 13 May 2007 election results for the Bürgerschaft of Bremen
Party	Votes	%	+/–	Seats			
Party	Votes	%	+/–	Bremen	Bremerhaven	Total seats	+/-
Social Democratic Party (SPD)	101,290	36.72	-5.6	27	5	32	-8
Christian Democratic Union (CDU)	70,728	25.64	-4.2	19	4	23	-6
Alliance 90/The Greens (Grüne)	45,493	16.49	+3.7	12	2	14	+2
The Left (Linke)	23,282	8.44	+6.7	6	1	7	+7
Free Democratic Party (FDP)	16,486	5.98	+1.8	4	1	5	+4
German People's Union (DVU)	7,536	2.73	+0.4	0	1	1	±0
Citizens in Rage (BiW)	2,336	0.85	-3.6	0	1	1	+1
Bremen Must Live	4,462	1.62	+1.6	0	0	0	±0
Others	4,203	1.52		0	0	0	±0
Total	275,816	100.00	–	68	15	83	0

Popular Vote
SPD	36.72%
CDU	25.64%
B'90/GRÜNE	16.49%
DIE LINKE	8.44%
FDP	5.98%
DVU	2.73%
BmL	1.62%
BiW	0.85%
Other	1.52%

Bürgerschaft seats
SPD	38.55%
CDU	27.71%
B'90/GRÜNE	16.87%
DIE LINKE	8.43%
FDP	6.02%
DVU	1.20%
BiW	1.20%
