= Sarah Ryglewski =

German politician

- Ryglewski in 2021

Minister of State in the Chancellery Coordinator of Federal-State Relations
- In office 8 December 2021 – 6 May 2025
- Chancellor: Olaf Scholz
- Preceded by: Hendrik Hoppenstedt
- Succeeded by: Michael Meister

Parliamentary State Secretary in the Ministry of Finance
- In office 2 September 2019 – 8 December 2021 Serving with Bettina Hagedorn
- Minister: Olaf Scholz
- Preceded by: Christine Lambrecht
- Succeeded by: Florian Toncar
Parliamentary constituencies
Member of the Bundestag; for Bremen I
In office 17 July 2015 – 25 March 2025
Preceded by	Carsten Sieling
Succeeded by	Seat vacant
Member of the Bürgerschaft of Bremen; for Bremen
In office 8 June 2011 – 16 July 2015
Preceded by	Multi-member district
Succeeded by	Sascha Karolin Aulepp

Personal details
- Born: 31 January 1983 (age 43) Cologne, West Germany
- Party: Social Democratic (since 2001)
- Education: University of Bremen
- Occupation: Politician; Civil Servant
- Website: Official website; Governmental website

Sarah Janina Ryglewski (born 31 January 1983) is a German politician of the Social Democratic Party (SPD) who served as a member of the Bundestag from the state of Bremen from 2015 to 2025.

In addition to her parliamentary work, Ryglewski served as Parliamentary State Secretary at the Federal Ministry of Finance in the government of Chancellor Angela Merkel (2019–2021) and as Minister of State for Federal-State Relations in the government of Chancellor Olaf Scholz (2021–2025).

== Early life and education ==
Born in Köln, North Rhine-Westphalia, Ryglewski studied political science at the University of Bremen from 2002 until 2009.

== Political career ==
=== Career in state politics ===
Since 2010, Ryglewski has been the deputy chair of the SPD in Bremen.

From 2011 to 2015, Ryglewski served as a member of the State Parliament of Bremen. She was her parliamentary group's spokesperson on consumer protection issues.

=== Member of the German Parliament, 2015–2025 ===
After Carsten Sieling was elected mayor of Bremen in July 2015, Ryglewski took his seat as a member of the Bundestag, representing the Bremen I district. In parliament, she served on the Finance Committee (2015-2019), the Committee on Petitions (2015-2017), the Committee on Legal Affairs and Consumer Protection (2018-2019) and the Budget Committee's Subcommittee on European Affairs (2018-2019). Within the SPD parliamentary group, she belongs to the Parliamentary Left, a left-wing movement.

In the negotiations to form a fourth coalition government under Merkel's leadership following the 2017 federal elections, Ryglewski was part of the working group on internal and legal affairs, led by Thomas de Maizière, Stephan Mayer and Heiko Maas. From 2018 until 2019, she was her parliamentary group's spokesperson for consumer protections issues.

In 2019, Ryglewski succeeded Christine Lambrecht as Parliamentary State Secretary at the Federal Ministry of Finance, under the leadership of minister Olaf Scholz.

In the negotiations to form a so-called traffic light coalition of the SPD, the Green Party and the Free Democratic Party (FDP) following the 2021 federal elections, Ryglewski was part of her party's delegation in the working group on financial regulation and the national budget, co-chaired by Doris Ahnen, Lisa Paus and Christian Dürr.

In July 2024, Ryglewski announced that she would not stand in the 2025 federal elections but instead resign from active politics by the end of the parliamentary term.

== Other activities ==
- Business Forum of the Social Democratic Party of Germany, Member of the Political Advisory Board (since 2020)
- Federal Foundation for the Reappraisal of the SED Dictatorship, Member of the Board of Trustees (since 2019)
- spw – Zeitschrift für sozialistische Politik und Wirtschaft, Member of the Editorial Board
- German United Services Trade Union (ver.di), Member
