= Citizens in Rage =

Citizens in Rage Bürger in Wut
- Leader: Jan Timke
- Founded: March 2004
- Dissolved: September 2023
- Preceded by: Party for a Rule of Law Offensive
- Merged into: Bündnis Deutschland
- Headquarters: Berlin
- Ideology: Right-wing populism; Economic liberalism
- Political position: Right-wing
- National affiliation: Bündnis Deutschland (2023)
- European affiliation: European Alliance for Freedom (2010–2016)

Citizens in Rage (German: Bürger in Wut, BIW) was a German right-wing populist political party in Germany formerly represented in the state parliament of Bremen. It was led by Jan Timke until its merger with Bündnis Deutschland in September 2023.

It was founded in March 2004 as a successor to the Bremen section of the Party for a Rule of Law Offensive ("Schill party"). Its focus was on law and order and opposition to immigration policies.

The association participated in the 2007 Bremen parliamentary election. Bremen electoral law has a threshold that a party must surmount by winning 5% of the popular vote, either in the city of Bremen, or in Bremerhaven. Citizens in Rage contested the smaller constituency of Bremerhaven. According to the official results, the association won 2,216 votes or 4.998% – only one vote short of the threshold. Thereupon, Citizens in Rage requested a re-count. The competent court detected relevant mistakes in the elections in the constituency of Bremerhaven, and imposed an election rerun in one voting precinct. In the rerun on 6 July 2008, Citizens in Rage won 27.6% of the popular vote in the concerned precinct, which revised the Bremerhaven result of the movement up to 5.29% – enough for one seat in the state parliament.

In the 2011 Bremen state election, Citizens in Rage could report significant gains: they won 3.7% of the popular vote statewide – in contrast to 0.8% in 2007, and could defend their seat in the state legislative assembly.

Citizens in Rage saw themselves as democratic conservative, although anti-establishment. Political scientists and observers classify the movement as right-wing populist, but not extremist or anti-constitutional.

Piet Leidreiter was the lead candidate for the party at the 2023 Bremen state election. The Party achieved their best-ever result with 9.4%, benefitting from the absence of the Alternative for Germany (AfD), who were disqualified from running due to internal party disputes. Following the election, BIW merged with Bündnis Deutschland.

== Election results ==
=== Bürgerschaft of Bremen ===
| Election | Popular Vote | | Seats | +/– | Status |
| Election | Votes | % | Seats | +/– | Status |
|---|---|---|---|---|---|
| 2007 | 2,336 | 0.8 (#7) | 1 / 83 | ▲1 | Opposition |
| 2011 | 48,530 | 3.7 (#5) | 1 / 83 | 1 | Opposition |
| 2015 | 37,759 | 3.2 (#7) | 1 / 83 | 1 | Opposition |
| 2019 | 35,808 | 2.4 (#7) | 1 / 84 | 1 | Opposition |
| 2023 | 118,527 | 9.4 (#5) | 10 / 84 | ▲9 | Opposition |

== See also ==
- Pro Germany Citizens' Movement
