= Elisabeth Motschmann =

German politician (born 1952)

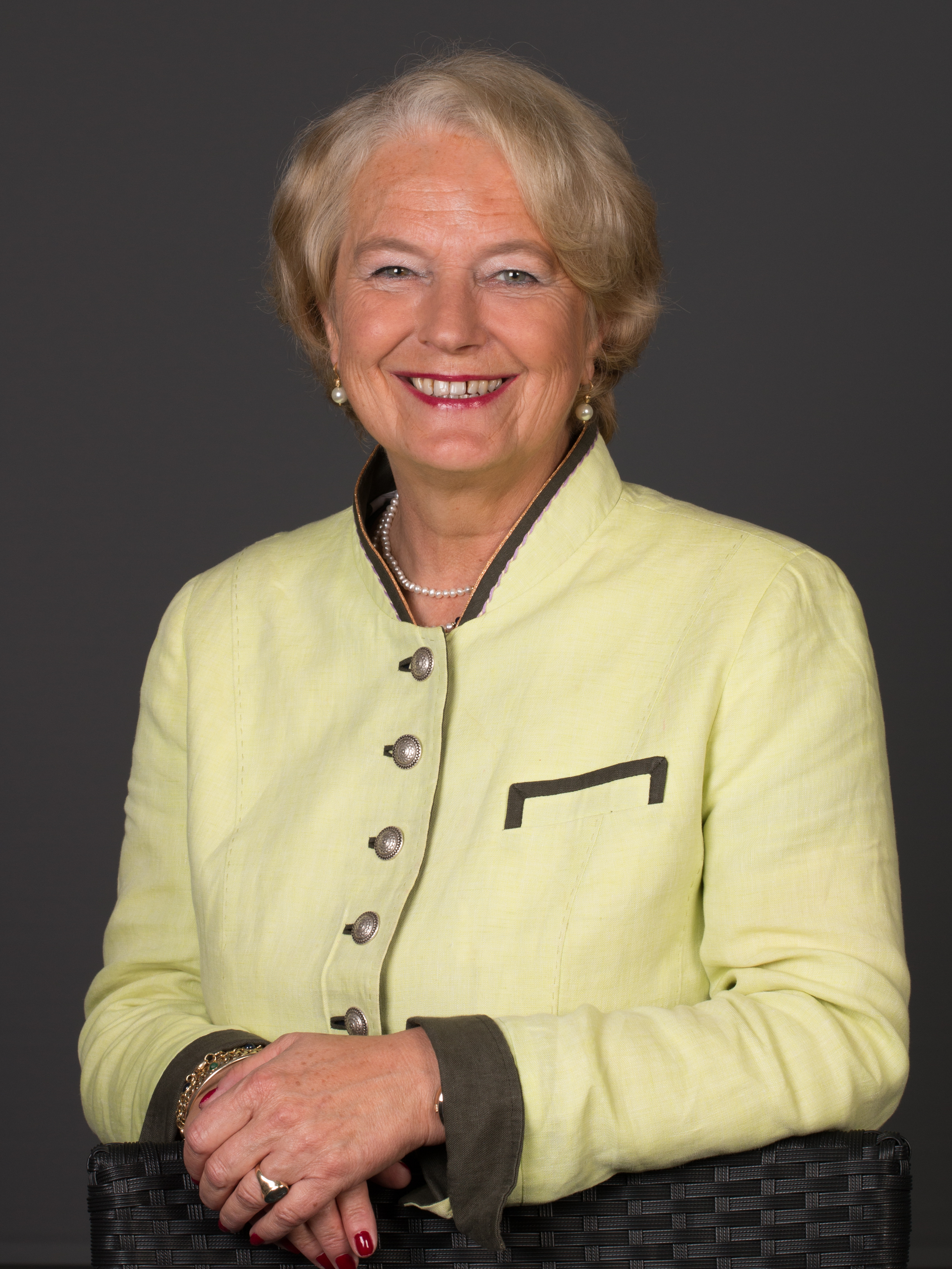
- Motschmann in 2014
- Full name: Elisabeth Charlotte Motschmann
- Born: Elisabeth Charlotte Freiin von Düsterlohe; 13 October 1952 (age 74); Lübeck, Schleswig-Holstein; Germany
- Noble family: Düsterlohe
- Spouse: Jens Motschmann
- Issue: Franziska Motschmann; Johannes Motschmann; Georg Motschmann
- Father: Baron Friedrich-Karl von Düsterlohe
- Mother: Renate Cramer

Member of the Bundestag
- In office 2013–2021

Personal details
- Party: Christian Democratic Union
- Occupation: Politician

Elisabeth Charlotte Motschmann (née Baroness von Düsterlohe; born 13 October 1952) is a German journalist and politician of the Christian Democratic Union (CDU) who has been serving as a member of the Bundestag from 2013 until 2021. In parliament, she was her party's spokeswoman on media policy.

Throughout her career, Motschmann has focused on women's issues and children's rights. She supports the ordination of women in Christian churches, and has advocated for establishing a legally regulated quota for women in leadership in the corporate sector in response to women's economic inequality and the gender-gap in chief executive positions in German companies.

== Early life and journalism ==
Motschmann was born Baroness Elisabeth Charlotte von Düsterlohe on 13 October 1952 in Lübeck, Schleswig-Holstein. A member of a German noble family, she is the second of three children of Renate Cramer and Baron Friedrich-Karl von Düsterlohe. Motschmann graduated from school in 1971 and, from 1972 to 1975, studied theology and romance languages at the University of Hamburg and the University of Kiel.

Motschmann worked as a freelance journalist and publicist until 1993, focusing on family and women's issues, child poverty, and reporting on third world countries. From 1986 to 1991 she was a freelancer at Norddeutscher Rundfunk and from 1986 until 1993 she worked for the Axel Springer publishing company.

== Political career ==
=== Career in state politics ===
Motschmann became a member of the Christian Democratic Union of Germany in the 1970s and was a member of the party's district board of Steinburg and Itzehoe. From 1977 to 1981, she served as the deputy state chairwoman of the Women's Union in Schleswig-Holstein and as a member of the state board of Schleswig-Holstein until 1987. After moving to Bremen she became the deputy chair of the Christian Democratic Union there from 1990 to 2006. In 1990 she became a member of the state council for sports and culture.

From 2012 until 2021, Motschmann was a member of the federal executive board of the Christian Democratic Union under the leadership of successive chairwomen Angela Merkel (2012–2018) and Annegret Kramp-Karrenbauer (2018–2021).

=== Member of the German Parliament, 2013–2021 ===
In March 2013, Motschmann was elected as a top candidate of the Christian Democratic Union in Bremen for the election of the 18th Bundestag, representing Bremen I. In 2015, she was the party's top candidate for the Bremen elections. In March 2017, she was re-elected as a member of the Bundestag. There she served as a member of the Foreign Affairs Committee and in 2019, she became a member of the Franco-German Parliamentary Assembly. She served as the culture and media policy spokesperson for the CDU/CSU parliamentary group.

In addition to her committee assignments, Motschmann was a member of the German delegation to the Parliamentary Assembly of the Council of Europe from 2018 until 2021. In the Assembly, she served on the Committee on Culture, Science, Education and Media; the Sub-Committee on Culture, Diversity and Heritage; the Sub-Committee on Disability, Multiple and Intersectional Discrimination; and the Sub-Committee on the Rights of Minorities (2018-2020).

In the negotiations to form the fourth coalition government under the leadership of Chancellor Angela Merkel following the 2017 federal elections, Motschmann was part of the working group on cultural and media affairs.

In February 2021, Motschmann announced that she would not stand in that year's federal elections but instead resign from active politics by the end of the parliamentary term.

== Life after politics ==
Since 2022, Motschmann has been working as Senior Policy Advisor at the Berlin office of Portland Communications.

== Other activities ==
- Deutsche Welle, Member of the Broadcasting Council
- Memorial to the Murdered Jews of Europe Foundation, Member of the Board of Trustees

== Political positions ==
Since 2009, Motschmann has advocated for women's right to participate in the Schaffermahlzeit, an annual captain's banquet at Bremen City Hall which has historically excluded women. In 2015, for the first time, female guests were invited to the 471st Schaffermahlzeit. She has also advocated for more women on supervisory boards of companies in Germany and for a legally regulated quota for women in leadership positions in the corporate sector.

In 1998, Motschmann joined the anti-abortion campaign Tim Leben! with the Yes to Life Foundation as a member of the board of trustees, working alongside Countess Johanna von Westphalen, Gloria, Princess of Thurn and Taxis, Prince Nikolaus von Lobkowicz, and Roland Rösler. But she has since changed her views on both, having stated in interviews that she “does not judge any woman, who gets an abortion”. She supports the abortion law as it stands in Germany and believes “that there are situations so hopeless that there is no other way.

She has distanced herself from her homophobic remarks from the 80s and since expressed an understanding for the queer community. But in June 2017, Motschmann voted against Germany's introduction of same-sex marriage.

In September 2020, Motschmann was one of 15 members of her parliamentary group who joined Norbert Röttgen in writing an open letter to Minister of the Interior Horst Seehofer which called on Germany and other EU counties to take in 5000 immigrants who were left without shelter after fires gutted the overcrowded Mória Reception and Identification Centre on the Greek island of Lesbos.

Ahead of the Christian Democrats’ leadership election in 2021, Motschmann publicly endorsed Norbert Röttgen to succeed Annegret Kramp-Karrenbauer as the party’s chair.

== Personal life ==
Motschmann married Jens Motschmann, a Lutheran theologian, in 1971. They have three children. She moved to Bremen in 1987 after her husband was hired as a minister at Saint Martin's Church. She is a practicing Lutheran and member of the Evangelical Church of Germany. She supports the ordination of women.
