= Claudia Schilling =

German politician (born 1968)

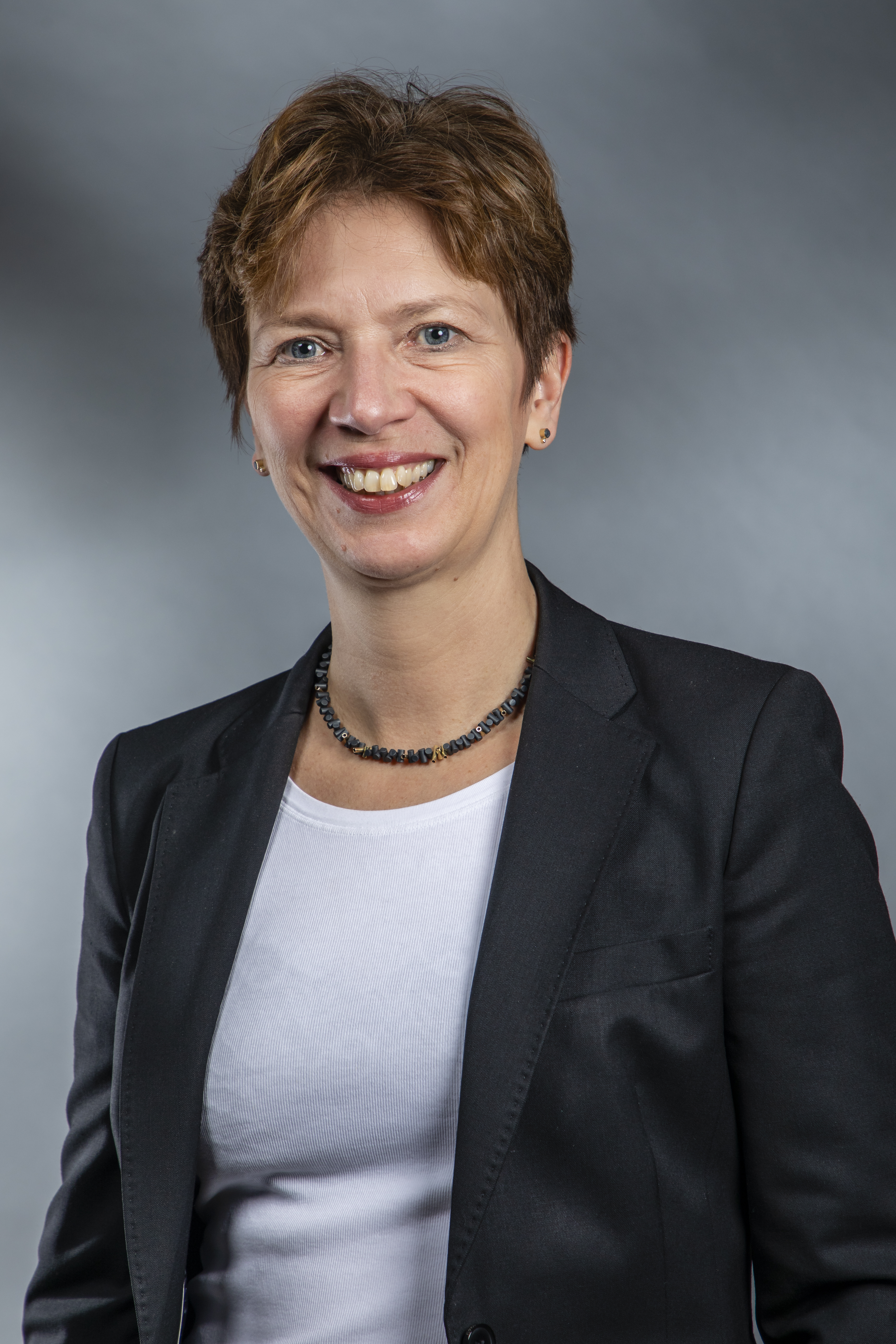
- Schilling in 2019

Senator for Justice and Constitutional Affairs of Bremen
- Incumbent
- Assumed office 15 August 2019
- Mayor: Andreas Bovenschulte
- Preceded by: Martin Günthner

Personal details
- Born: 13 June 1968 (age 57) Wolfsburg
- Party: Social Democratic Party (since 2004)

Claudia Schilling (born 13 June 1968 in Wolfsburg) is a German politician. She has served as senator for justice and constitutional affairs of Bremen since 2019, and as senator for labour, social affairs, youth and integration since 2023. From 2019 to 2023, she served as senator for science and ports.
