= Karoline Linnert =

German politician (born 1958)

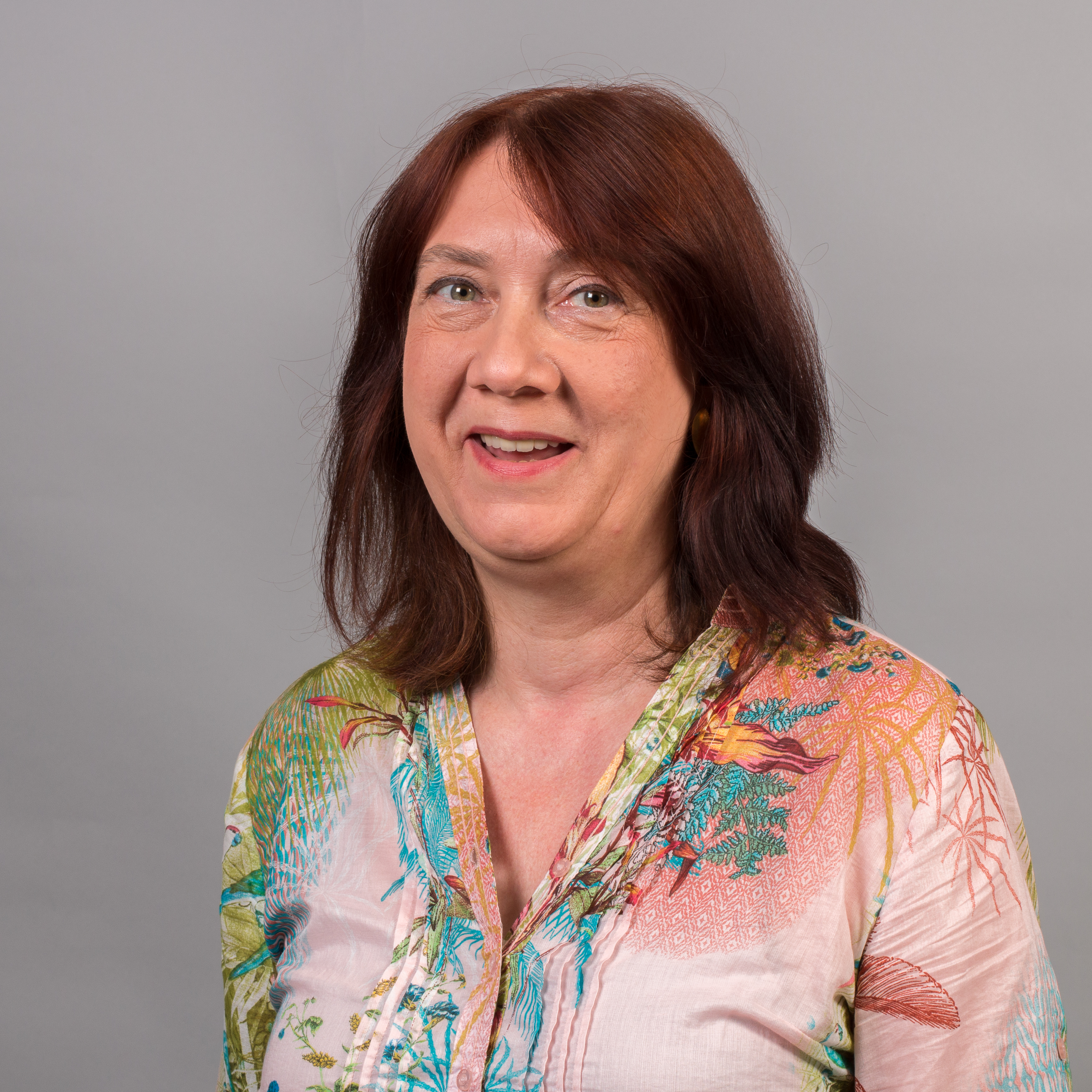
Karoline Linnert (2014)

Karoline Linnert (born 30 August 1958) is a German politician of the Alliance '90/The Greens. From 2007 until 2019, she served as Senator of Finance and Mayor of the city-state of Bremen. During her time in office, she was one of two people holding the title Mayor, the other being Carsten Sieling, the President of the Senate of Bremen.

== Early life and education ==
Linnert was born in Bielefeld. She studied psychology at Bielefeld University and the University of Oldenburg, graduating in 1988.

== Political career ==
Linnert became a member of The Greens in 1980, and was the top candidate of her party in Bremen in the 2007 state elections. From 1991, she served as a member of the Parliament of Bremen, and was chair of the Green parliamentary group from 2000 to 2007. She served as chair of the Public Expenditures Committee from 2003 to 2007.

As a result of the 2007 elections, Linnert's party entered a coalition government with the Social Democrats, and she became Senator of Finance and Mayor (co-mayor). As one of the state's representatives at the Bundesrat, she serves on the Finance Committee.

During her time in office, Linnert led the negotiations with NordLB on the takeover of state-controlled Bremer Landesbank (BLB).

== Other activities ==
=== Regulatory agencies ===
- Stability Council, Ex-Officio Member (2010-2019)

=== Corporate boards ===
- Bremer Landesbank, Ex-Officio Chairwoman of the Supervisory Board (2007-2019)
- Bremeninvest / WFB Wirtschaftsförderung Bremen GmbH, Ex-Officio Deputy Chairwoman of the Supervisory Board (2007-2019)
- BLG Logistics Group, Ex-Officio Member of the Supervisory Board (2007-2019)
- Eurogate, Ex-Officio Member of the Supervisory Board (2007-2019)
- Öffentliche Versicherungen Bremen (ÖVB), Ex-Officio Member of the Supervisory Board (2007-2019)
- KfW, Member of the Board of Supervisory Directors (2010–2012)
