= Jan Timke =

German politician (born 1971)

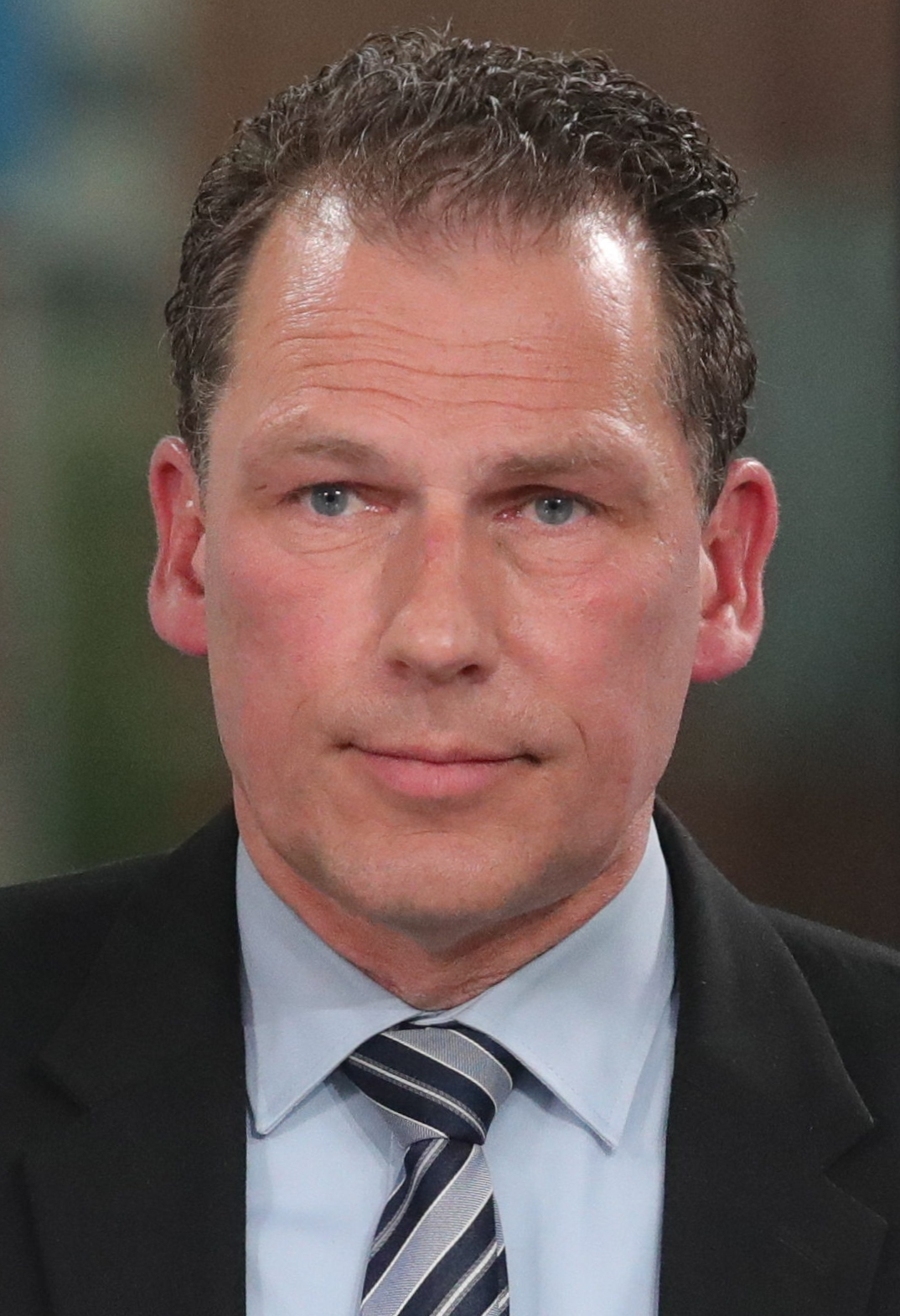
- Timke in 2023

Member of the Bürgerschaft of Bremen
- Incumbent
- Assumed office 23 September 2008

Personal details
- Born: 3 January 1971 (age 55) Hoya
- Party: Bündnis Deutschland (since 2023)
- Other political affiliations: Citizens in Rage (2004–2023)

Jan Timke (born 3 January 1971 in Hoya) is a German politician serving as a member of the Bürgerschaft of Bremen since 2008. He has served as group leader of Bündnis Deutschland since 2023. From 2004 to 2023, he served as chairman of Citizens in Rage.
