= Carsten Sieling =

German politician

Carsten Sieling MdBB
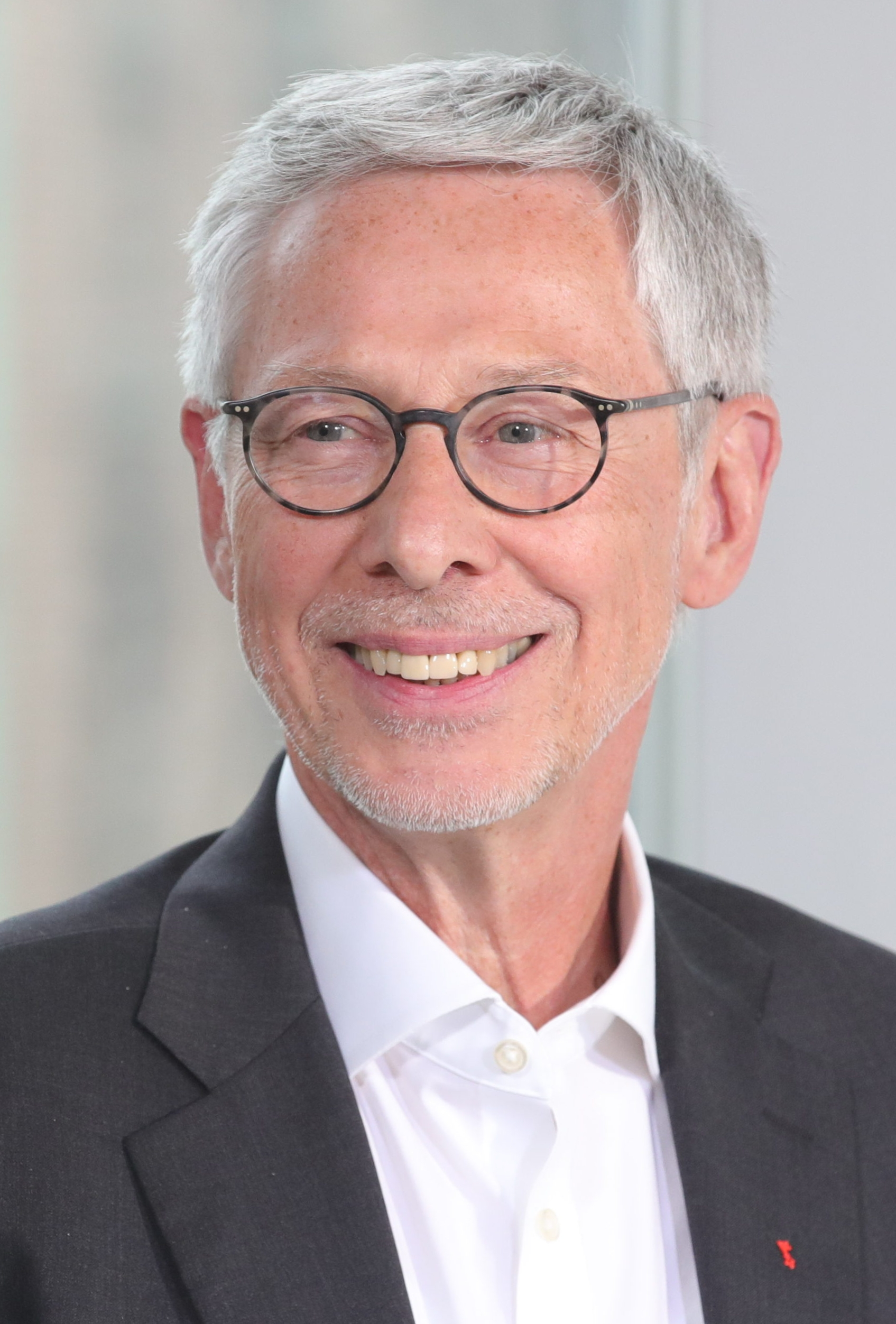
- Sieling in 2023

President of the Senate and Mayor of the Free Hanseatic City of Bremen
- In office 15 July 2015 – 15 August 2019
- Deputy: Karoline Linnert
- Preceded by: Jens Böhrnsen
- Succeeded by: Andreas Bovenschulte

Leader of the Social Democratic Party in the Bürgerschaft of Bremen
- In office 8 November 2005 – 13 October 2009
- Preceded by: Jens Böhrnsen
- Succeeded by: Björn Tschöpe
Parliamentary constituencies
Member of the Bürgerschaft of Bremen; for Bremen
Incumbent
Assumed office 8 June 2019
Preceded by	Multi-member district
In office 8 June 1995 – 13 October 2009
Preceded by	Multi-member district
Succeeded by	Reiner Holsten
Member of the Bundestag; for Bremen I
In office 27 October 2009 – 16 July 2015
Preceded by	Volker Kröning
Succeeded by	Sarah Ryglewski

Personal details
- Born: 13 January 1959 (age 67) Nienburg/Weser, West Germany
- Party: Social Democratic (since 1976)
- Children: 3
- Education: Hamburger Universität für Wirtschaft und Politik; University of Bremen; University of Maryland
- Occupation: Politician; Research fellow; Economist; Industrial Clerk
- Website: Party website; Governmental website

Carsten Günter Erich Sieling (born 13 January 1959) is a German politician of the Social Democratic Party (SPD) who served as the President of the Senate and Mayor of Bremen from 2015 to 2019. His successor is Andreas Bovenschulte.

== Political career ==
From 2009 to 2015, Sieling was a member of the Bundestag, where he served on the Finance Committee. During the time of position held, he was his parliamentary group's rapporteur on consumer protection in financial services. Between 2010 and 2013, he was a member of the Sub-Committee on Municipal Policy. From 2012, he also served as deputy chairman of the German-British Parliamentary Friendship Group.

Sieling resigned from his seat in parliament to become President of the Senate and Mayor of Bremen in July 2015, succeeding Jens Böhrnsen. As one of the state's representatives at the Bundesrat, he served on the Committee on Foreign Affairs and on the Committee on Defence. Between October 2015 and October 2016, he chaired the Conference of Ministers-President.

In the negotiations to form a coalition government under the leadership of Chancellor Angela Merkel following the 2017 federal elections, Sieling was an SPD delegate in the working group on social affairs, led by Karl-Josef Laumann, Barbara Stamm and Andrea Nahles.

Following his party's result in the 2019 state elections, Sieling resigned from his office.

== Other activities ==
=== Corporate boards ===
- BLG Logistics, Member of the Advisory Board
- ArcelorMittal Bremen, Member of the Supervisory Board (2013–2015)
- GEWOBA AG, Member of the Supervisory Board (2003–2010)
- Bremische Gesellschaft für Stadterneuerung, Stadtentwicklung und Wohnungsbau, Member of the Supervisory Board (1999–2003)

=== Non-profit organizations ===
- Cultural Foundation of the German States (KdL), Member of the Council
- Deutsches Museum, Member of the Board of Trustees
- Friedrich Ebert Foundation (FES), Member
- German Council on Foreign Relations (DGAP), Chairman of the Task Force on International Space Policy
- IG Metall, Member
- German United Services Trade Union (ver.di), Member
- Haus & Grund Bremen, Chairman of the Board (2009–2012)
