= 2019 in Germany =

- Decades: 1990s; 2000s; 2010s; 2020s; 2030s
- See also: Other events of 2019; History of Germany • Timeline • Years

The following is a list of events from the year 2019 in Germany.

== Incumbents ==
- President: Frank-Walter Steinmeier
- Chancellor: Angela Merkel

== Events ==
=== January ===
- 29 December 2018 to 6 January – The 2018–2019 Four Hills Tournament
- 22 January – Signing of the Aachen Treaty in Aachen, 56 years to the day after the signing of the Élysée Treaty
- 26 January – The Commission on Growth, Structural Change and Employment by the German government recommends Germany to entirely phase out and shut down coal-fired plants on its territory by 2038.

=== February ===
- 7 to 17 February – The annual 69th Berlin International Film Festival takes place, with French actress Juliette Binoche as the Jury President. The Golden Bear is awarded to Israeli-French film Synonyms, directed by Nadav Lapid.
- 21 February – A German court fines two ex-employers of German gun maker Heckler & Koch for illegal gun sales to Mexico.

=== May ===
- 26 May – 2019 Bremen state election
- 26 May – 2019 European Parliament election in Germany

=== June ===
- 2 June – Murder of Walter Lübcke, a German politician and a member of the Christian Democratic Union of Germany who is found shot in the head at close range on the terrace of his residence.

=== July ===
- 28 July – Formula One grand prix occurs in Hockenheim, Germany.

=== September ===
- 1 September
  - 2019 Brandenburg state election: The SPD declines 5.7% with 26.2% of the vote and AfD becomes the second largest party in Brandenburg with 23.5%.
  - 2019 Saxony state election: The CDU declines 7.3% with 32.1% of the vote and AfD becomes the second largest party in Saxony with 27.5%.
- 5 September – The (NPD) National Democratic Party of Germany Stefan Jagsch becomes the Mayor of the Waldsiedlung. The unanimous election of the NPD politician in the local council shocks other parties including Angela Merkel's Christian Democratic Union (CDU), the center-left Social Democrats (SPD), and the liberal Free Democratic Party (FDP), whose local council members voted for Jagsch.
- 10 September – The Supply Chains Law Campaign is launched by multiple German NGOs and trade unions, urging the government to pass a law requiring companies to enforce human rights safeguards in their supply chains.

=== October ===
- 9 October – Halle synagogue shooting: Two people are killed in Halle, when a gunman attacks a synagogue on Yom Kippur.
- 27 October – 2019 Thuringian state election: The Die Linke wins the election with 31.0% of the vote, the AfD becomes the second largest party in Thuringia with 23.4% of the vote.

=== November ===
- 25 November – Dresden Green Vault burglary: Three sets of 18th-century jewellery are stolen from Dresden’s Grünes Gewölbe in a dawn heist after a nearby fire disabled alarms.

== Deaths ==
=== January ===
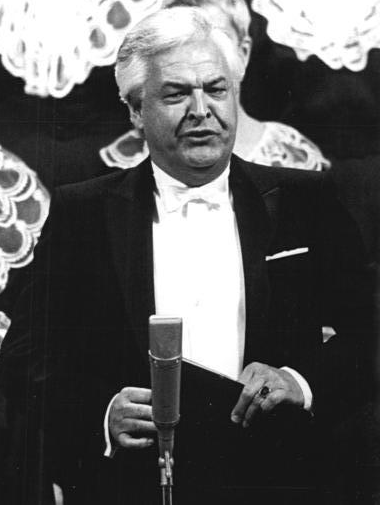
Theo Adam

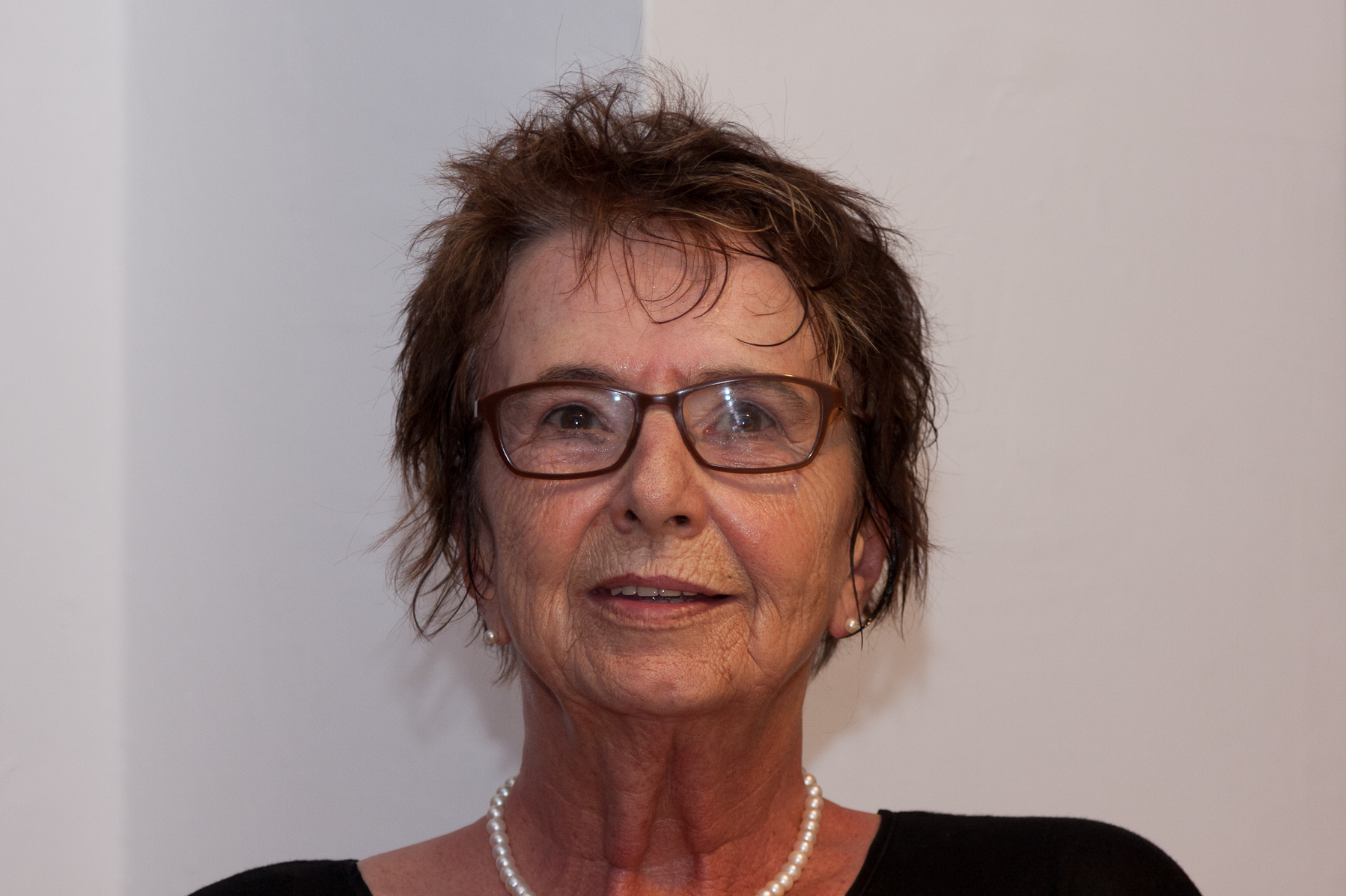
Mirjam Pressler

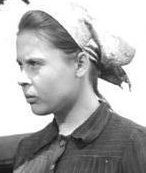
Ursula Karusseit

- 1 January
  - Bernd Kröplin, engineer and academic (b. 1944).
  - Arno Sames, German theologist and church historian (b. 1937).
- 2 January
  - Eckhart Dietz, German sculptor (b. 1933).
  - Karl Sewart, German writer (b. 1933).
- 3 January – Wulf Steinmann, physicist (b. 1930).
- 6 January
  - Gebhardt von Moltke, diplomat (b. 1938).
  - Gustav Andreas Tammann, astronomer (b. 1932).
- 7 January – Helmut Berding, historian (b. 1930).
- 8 January – Giorgio Zur, Roman Catholic prelate, Apostolic Nuncio (b. 1930).
- 10 January
  - Theo Adam, opera singer (b. 1926).
  - Gerd Jaeger, sculptor and painter (b. 1927).
- 13 January – Susanne Neumann, author and trade unionist (b. 1959).
- 14 January – Rainer Stadelmann, egyptologist (b. 1933).
- 16 January – Mirjam Pressler, writer (b. 1940).
- 20 January – Klaus Enders, sidecar racer, World Champion (b. 1937).
- 21 January – Lothar Kobluhn, footballer (b. 1943).
- 22 January – Wolfgang Thonke, military officer (b. 1938).
- 27 January – Countess Maya von Schönburg-Glauchau, socialite (b. 1958).
- 29 January – Alf Lüdtke, historian (b. 1943).

=== February ===
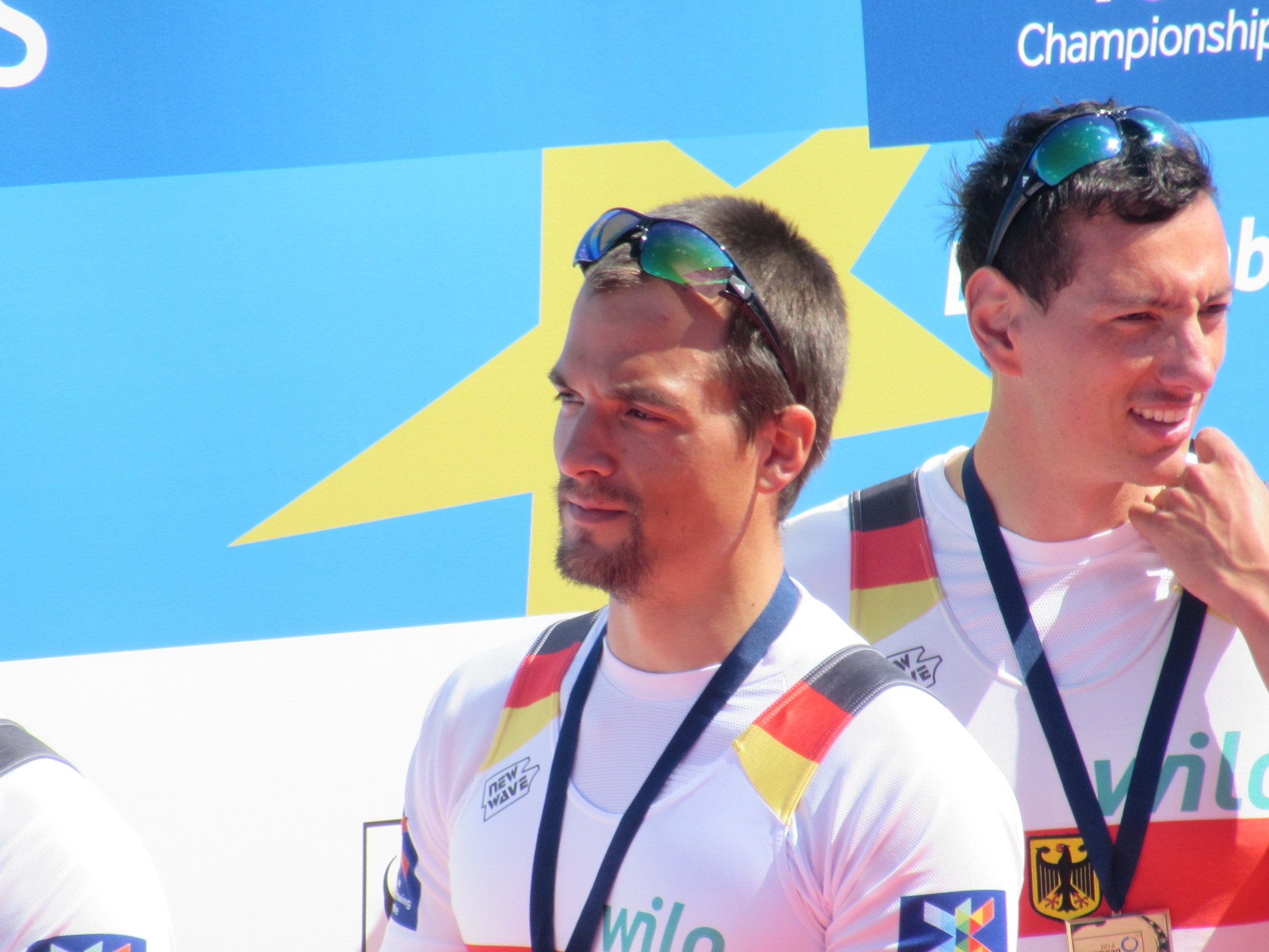
Maximilian Reinelt

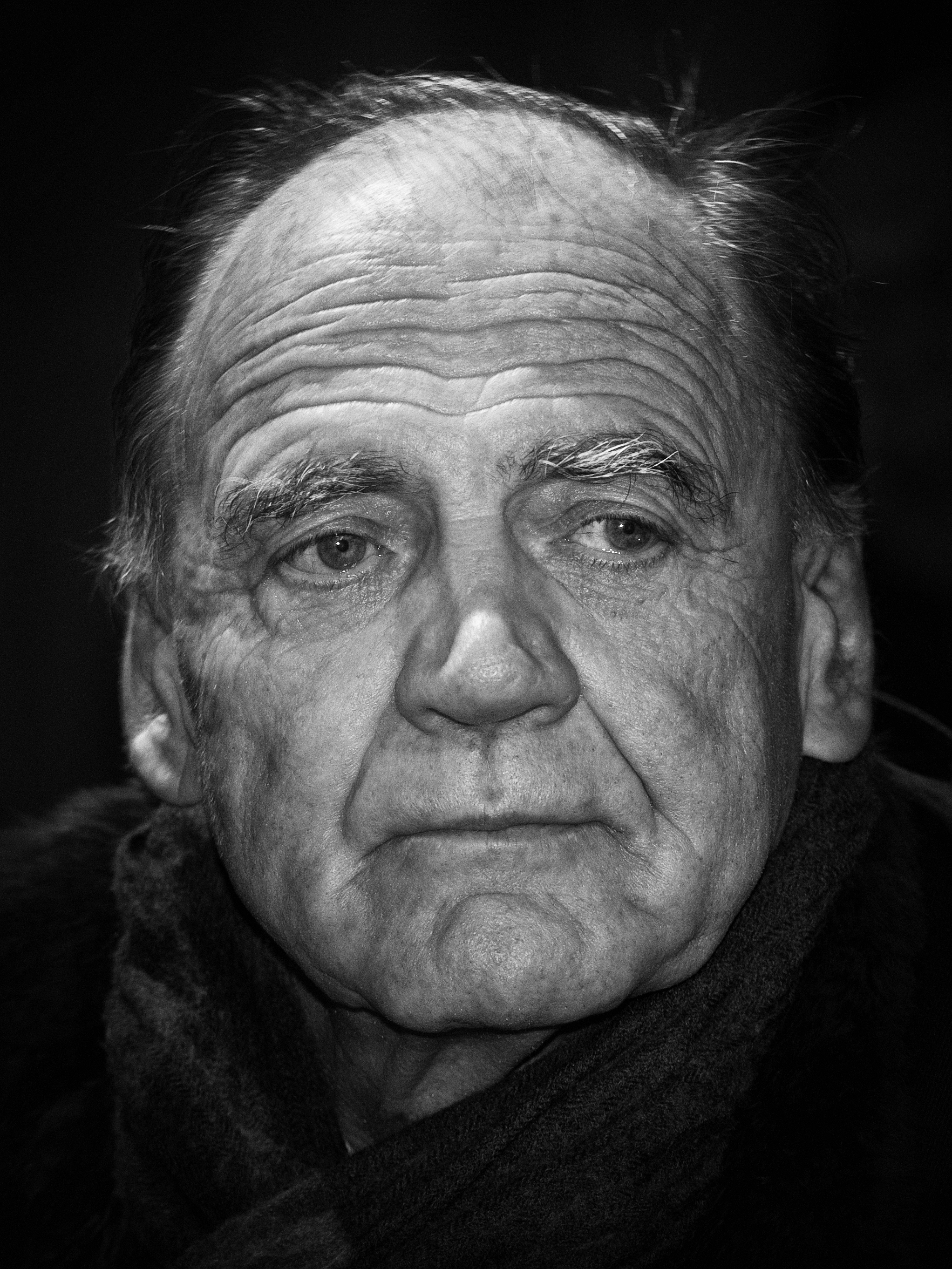
Bruno Ganz

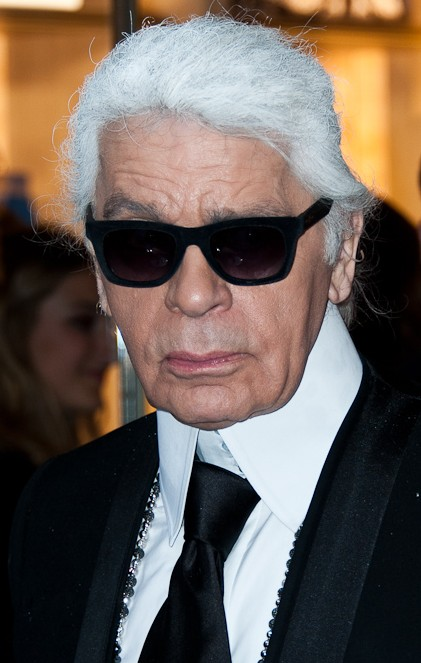
Karl Lagerfeld

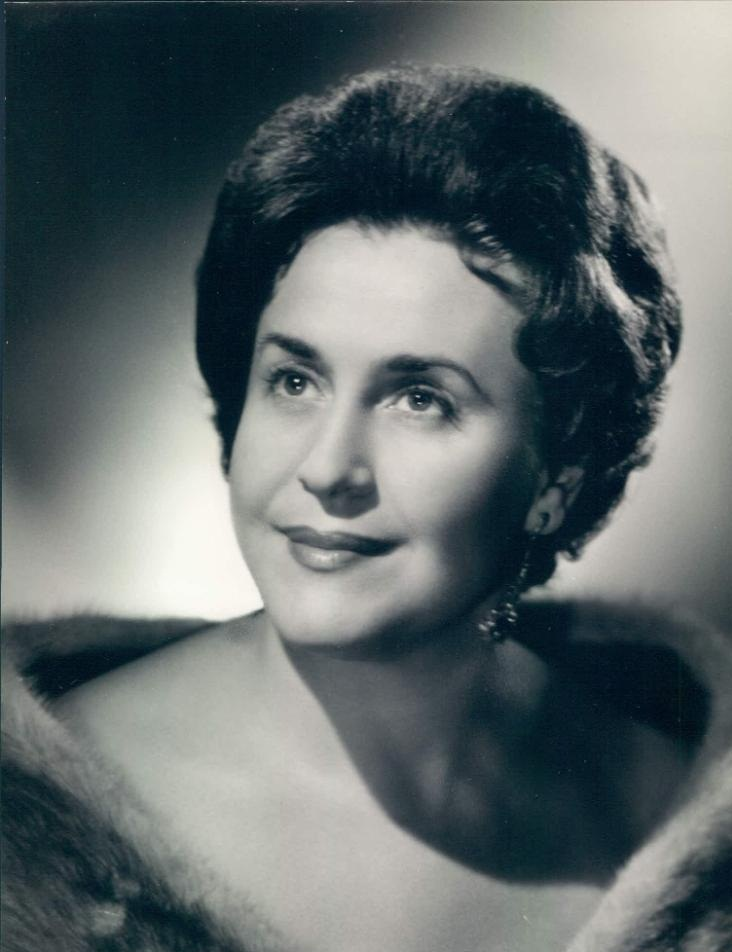
Hilde Zadek

- 1 February – Ursula Karusseit, actress (b. 1939)
- 2 February – William Davis, German-born British journalist (BBC) (b. 1933)
- 4 February
  - Hermann Graml, historian (b. 1928)
  - Leonie Ossowski, writer (Zwei Mütter) (b. 1925)
- 6 February
  - Rudi Assauer, football player and coach (b. 1944)
  - Manfred Eigen, biophysical chemist, Nobel Prize laureate (b. 1927)
- 7 February
  - Heidi Mohr, footballer (TuS Niederkirchen, TuS Ahrbach, national team) (b. 1967)
  - Jörg Schönbohm, military officer and politician, Inspector of the Army, and Deputy Minister President of Brandenburg (b. 1937)
- 8 February
  - Seweryn Bialer, German-born American political scientist (b. 1926)
  - Kurt Sommerlatt, football player (Karlsruher SC, Bayern Munich) and manager (Borussia Neunkirchen). (b. 1928)
- 9 February – Katharina Lindner, German-born Scottish footballer (Glasgow City F.C.) (b. 1979)
- 10 February
  - Heinz Fütterer, sprinter, Olympic bronze medalist (b. 1931)
  - Maximilian Reinelt, rower, Olympic champion and silver medalist (b. 1988)
- 12 February
  - Rolf Böhme, politician (b. 1934)
  - Christoph Broelsch, surgeon (b. 1944)
  - Georg Jann, organ builder (b. 1934)
- 15 February – Erika Simon, archaeologist (b. 1927)
- 16 February – Bruno Ganz, German-speaking Swiss actor (b. 1941)
- 19 February – Karl Lagerfeld, fashion designer (b. 1933)
- 20 February
  - Peter Rüchel, music journalist and founder of Rockpalast (b. 1937)
  - Ekkehard Wlaschiha, operatic baritone, Grammy winner (b. 1938)
- 21 February – Hilde Zadek, soprano (b. 1917)
- 24 February – Lothar Zenetti, theologian (b. 1926)
- 25 February – Ernst-Wolfgang Böckenförde, judge (b. 1933)
- 28 February – André Previn, German-born American composer (b. 1929)

=== March ===
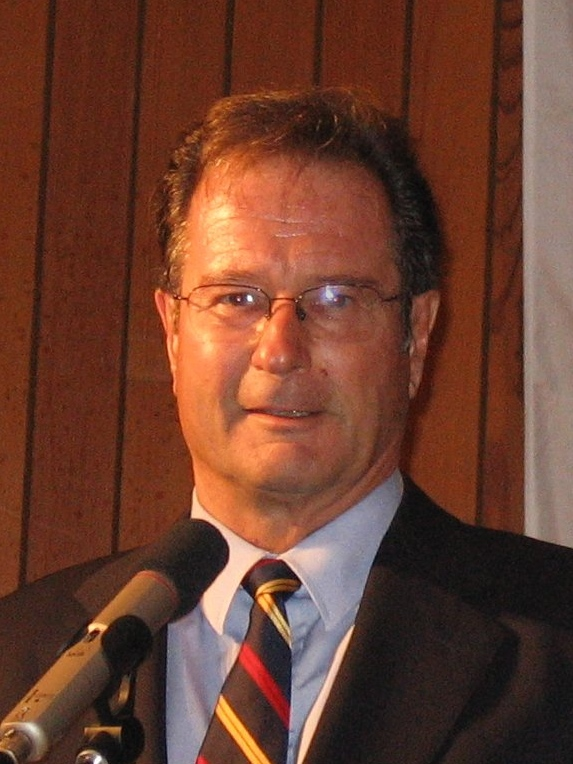
Klaus Kinkel

- 2 March – Arnulf Baring, German lawyer, historian, journalist and political scientist (born 1932)
- 4 March – Klaus Kinkel, German civil servant, lawyer, and politician (born 1936)
- 13 March – Andrea Pollack, German butterfly swimmer (born 1961)
- 15 March – Okwui Enwezor, Nigerian curator, art critic, writer, poet, and educator (born 1963)

=== April ===
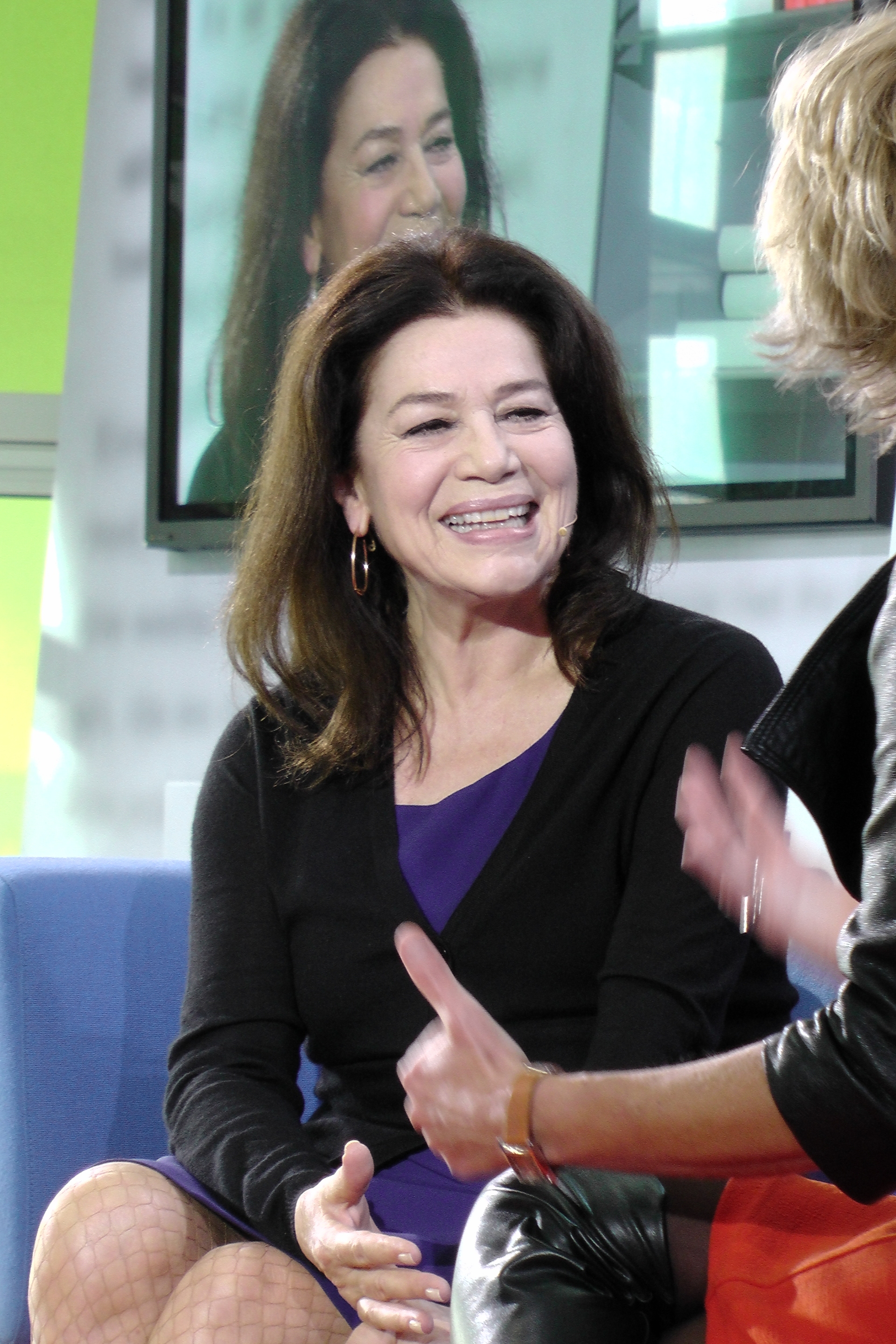
Hannelore Elsner

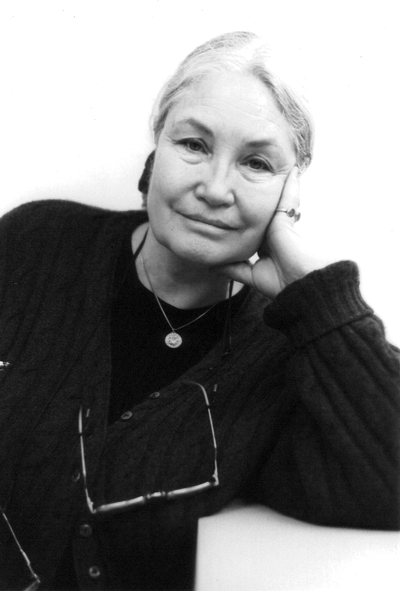
Ellen Schwiers

- 2 April – Rosemarie Springer, German Olympic equestrian (b. 1920)
- 19 April
  - Martin Böttcher, German composer, arranger and conductor (b. 1927
  - Verena Wagner Lafferentz, German associate of Adolf Hitler (b. 1920)
- 21 April – Hannelore Elsner, German actress (b. 1942)
- 25 April – Michael Wolf, German photographer (b. 1954)
- 26 April – Ellen Schwiers, German actress (b. 1930)

=== May ===
- 1 May – Beatrix Philipp, German politician (born 1945)
- 7 May – Georg Katzer, German composer (born 1935)
- 7 May – Michael Wessing, German javelin thrower (born 1952)
- 8 May – Jens Beutel, German politician (born 1946)
- 10 May – Paul-Werner Scheele, German Roman Catholic bishop (born 1928)
- 10 May – Anatol Herzfeld, German sculptor (born 1931)
- 13 May – Jörg Kastendiek, German politician (born 1964)
- 14 May – Remig Stumpf, German cyclist (born 1966)

=== June ===
- 2 June – Walter Lübcke, German politician (b. 1953)
- 3 June – Duchess Woizlawa Feodora of Mecklenburg, German royal (b. 1918)
- 8 June – Karl Hurm, German painter (b. 1930)
- 13 June – Wilhelm Wieben, German television moderator (born 1935)
- 15 June – Heinrich Lummer, German politician (b. 1932)
- 16 June – Rolf von Sydow, German film director (b. 1924)
- 20 June – Wibke Bruhns, German journalist (born 1938)
- 28 June – Lisa Martinek, German actress (born 1972)

=== July ===
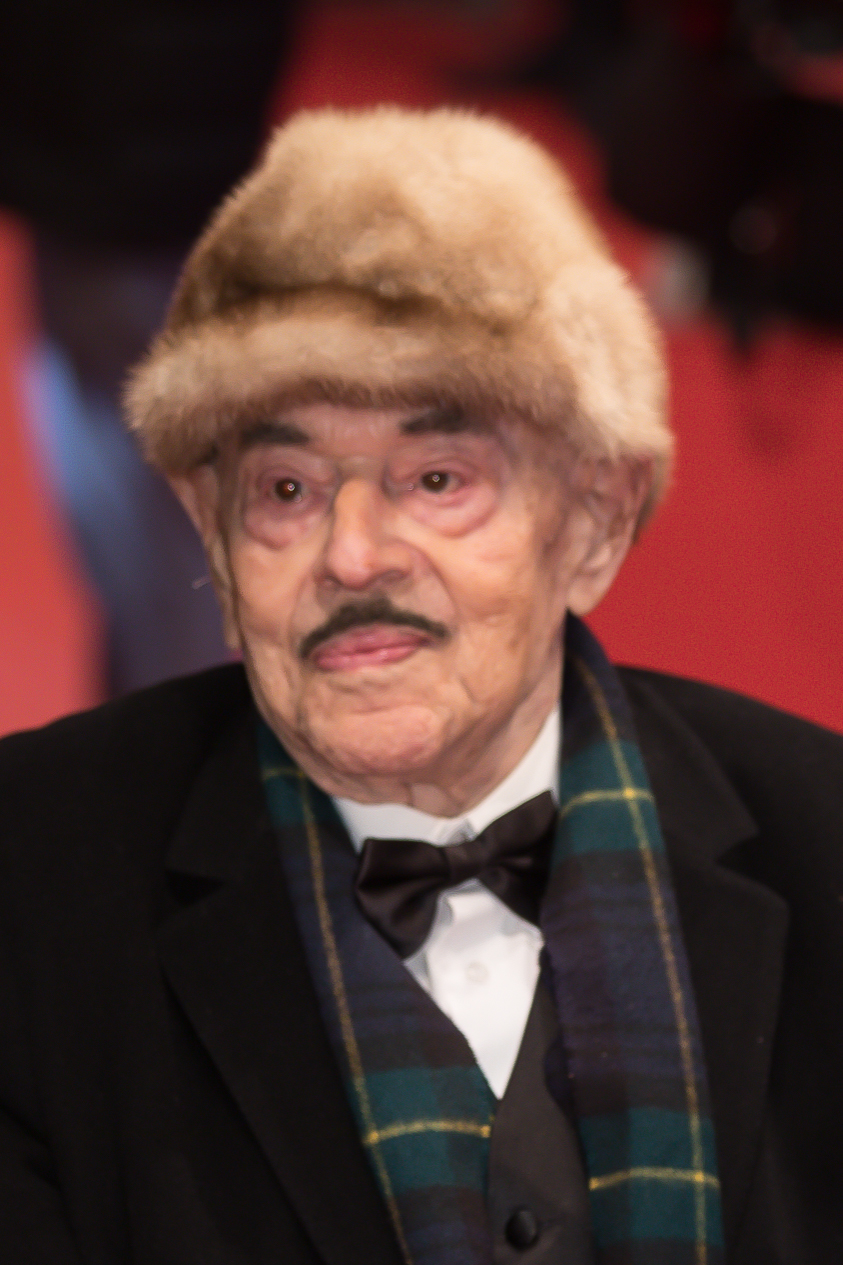
Arthur Brauner

- 2 July – Lis Verhoeven, German actress (born 1931)
- 7 July – Artur Brauner, Polish-born German film producer (b. 1918)
- 22 July – Brigitte Kronauer, German writer (born 1940)

=== August ===
- 7 August – Helmut Bez, German writer (born 1930)
- 26 August – Helmut Krauss, German actor (born 1941)
- 30 August – Udo Schaefer, German writer, jurist and theologian of Bahai (born 1926)

=== September ===
- 2 September – Tom Zickler, German film producer (born 1964)
- 3 September – Peter Lindbergh, German fashion photographer (born 1944)
- 9 September – Lissy Gröner, German politician (born 1954)
- 21 September – Sigmund Jähn, German cosmonaut and pilot (born 1937)

=== October ===
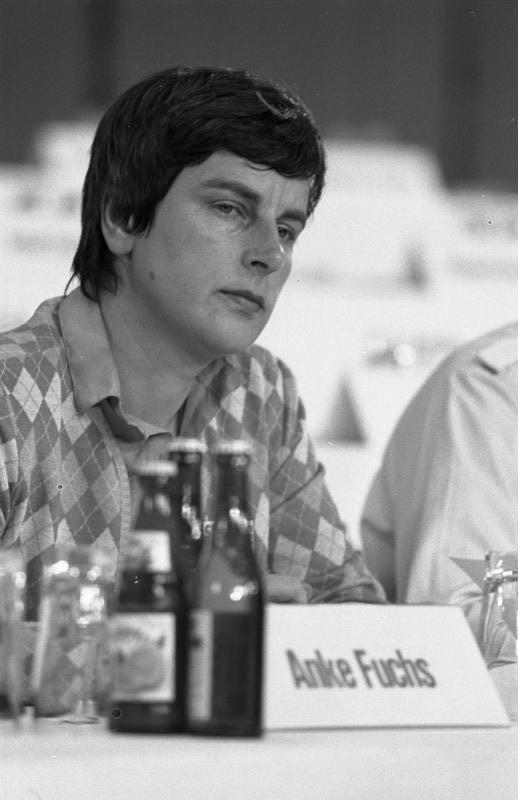
Anke Fuchs

- 9 October – Inge Hecht, German politician (born 1947)
- 14 October – Anke Fuchs, German politician (born 1937)
- 19 October – Erhard Eppler German politician (born 1926)
- October – Volker Hinz, German photograph (born 1947)

=== November ===
- 2 November – Norbert Eder, German footballer (born 1955)
- 16 November – Walter Freiwald, German television moderator (born 1954)

=== December ===
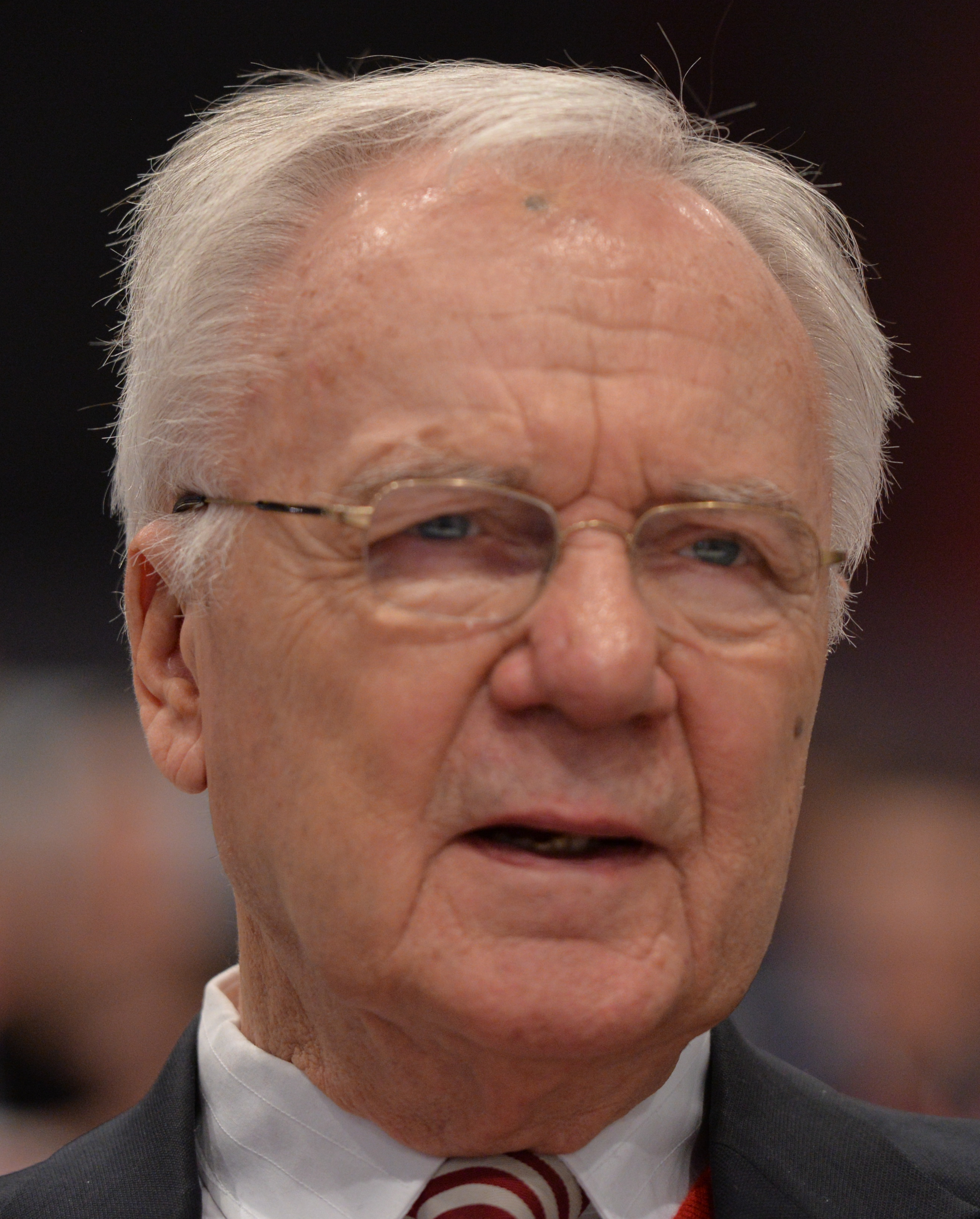
Manfred Stolpe

- 2 December – Johann Baptist Metz, German Roman Catholic theologian and priest (born 1928)
- 7 December – Herbert Joos, German jazz trumpeter and graphic designer (born 1940)
- 17 December – Karin Balzer, German hurdler (born 1938)
- 20 December – Hermann L. Gremliza, German journalist (born 1940)
- 20 December – Roland Matthes, German swimmer (born 1950)
- 29 December – Manfred Stolpe, German politician (born 1936)
- 30 December – Jan Fedder, German actor (born 1955)
- 30 December – Harry Kupfer, German opera director and academic.(born 1935)

== See also ==
- 2019 European Parliament election
