= Andreas Roloff =

German scientist and author

Andreas Roloff (born 15 May 1955 in Bremen) is a German forest scientist.

He specializes in the fields of forest botany and dendrology. He held a professorship for these two fields from 1990 to 1993 at the University of Göttingen and since 1994 the chair for forest botany at the Royal Saxon Academy of Forestry in Tharandt, specializing in forest sciences at TU Dresden.

== Early life and education ==
Roloff grew up in Bremen, where he also attended school and passed his Abitur in 1974 at the old grammar school. He then did community service and then worked as a parenting assistant in the special education children's home for difficult-to-educate children and adolescents in Rosdorf-Obernjesa near Göttingen. Afterwards, he started to study psychology in 1976 at the University of Göttingen.

After passing the intermediate diploma in 1979, Roloff switched to the forest sciences department. He obtained a degree in forestry in 1984. He then stopped at the Forest Sciences Department of the university, worked as a research assistant at the Institute of Forest Botany and conducted research at the same time for his dissertation morphology of crown development of Fagus sylvatica with special reference may innovative changes, which he in 1986 on Forest Science Department for Dr. forest. PhDhas been. The work, in which Roloff showed how European beeches can make use of the airspace, met with a great response from the forestry experts - not least against the background of the debates about the so-called forest decline. Based on this knowledge, a widely used key to addressing growth anomalies in beech was created. Roloff was awarded the Thurn and Taxis Advancement Award for Forestry Science by the end of 1986 for his research achievements. At the end of the year, Roloff was awarded the Thurn and Taxis Prize for Forest Science in 1986 for his research achievements. At the award ceremony at LMU Munich, LMU's president Wulf Steinmann said:

Who would have thought that in the age of biochemistry, physiology, molecular genetics or biomathematics, it would be possible to use morphology, a rather descriptive, very old science to expand our knowledge of tree life and at the same time make an important contribution to understanding the processes which have become known under the term new types of forest damage.[2]

== Professor in Göttingen and Dresden / Tharandt ==
This scientific success confirmed Roloff in his decision to embark on a scientific career. He stayed at the Institute for Forest Botany until 1987, before moving to the thematically closely related Institute for Silviculture in the department as a research assistant until 1990.

He extended the research methods he used on the common beech to other tree species. In 1988 he qualified as a professor at the forest science department of the University of Göttingen with a thesis on crown development and vitality assessment of selected tree species of the moderate latitudes and received the license to teach forest botany. He then worked as a research assistant at the Institute for Silviculture at the University of Göttingen until 1990, which also included teaching responsibility for forest vegetation science.

In 1990 Roloff was appointed to the Chair of Forest Botany and Dendrology at the Institute for Forest Botany at the University of Göttingen. This also included the scientific management of the Forest Botanical Garden at the University of Göttingen, with Andreas Bärtels supporting him as technical director.

In 1993, Roloff accepted a chair for forest botany at the forest sciences department at TU Dresden in Tharandt, where he has been teaching and researching since 1994. This professorship is linked to the position of director of the Institute for Forest Botany and Forest Zoology and the Tharandt Forest Botanical Garden of TU Dresden, one of the world's oldest and largest scientific wood collections. He is also a member of the board of directors of the Institute for Dendrochronology, Tree Care and Wood Management Tharandt eV (Dendro Institute for short), which is closely connected to the TUD. His current work focuses on drought stress reactions and adaptation, choice of tree species, tree aging and dealing with invasive tree species.

== Scientific achievements ==
In the early years of his academic career, Roloff brought more attention to the field of morphology and dendrology within forest botany and derived important findings for practical applications. His years of research in this area led to the standard work Baumkronen - Understanding and Practical Meaning of a Complex Natural Phenomenon, published in 2001 . In trees - phenomena of adaptation and optimization / Trees - Phenomena of Adaptation and Optimization(2004), which was also aimed at dendrological laypeople, he focused on the holistic view of the tree as a living being and its survival strategies. After the forest dying debate had calmed down in the forest scientific community and was replaced by the assumption of climate change with worldwide dramatic effects, Roloff has dealt with tree-biological questions on this complex of topics in his research.

In addition, Roloff, who has regularly worked as a tree expert for courts since the 1980s, also dealt intensively with the topics of tree care and the so-called urban forestry. City trees, in particular their biology, use and care, have been one of his main research areas since the mid-2000s . [6] For this purpose, Roloff has also successfully spun threads into practice and developed street tree concepts with several cities (including Jena, Hamburg, Erfurt). Together with Detlef Thiel, head of the Office for Urban Greenery and Waste Management in Dresden, he is the initiator and organizer of the Dresden City Tree Daysthat have been held alternately in Dresden or Tharandt since 2007. Since 2016, he has headed the tree control guidelines committee of the FLL, which revises the regulations for road safety control of trees. The new edition will appear in 2020.

He is also a speaker at many other advanced training events in the field of tree biology and tree care. He gives these in addition to his regular academic teaching duties for forest scientists, landscape architects and geographers. [6] Roloff is also involved in the academic self-administration of the TU Dresden, was dean of studies for Forest Sciences from 1994 to 2003 and has been chairman of the examination board since 2018.

In addition to numerous publications in a wide variety of specialist publications, Roloff is also the author or co-author of several books. In addition to those already mentioned, he wrote together with Andreas Bärtels the flora of the woody plants, which were primarily intended for forestry and horticultural practice (first time in 1996 ). Since 1997, Roloff has also been the publisher, together with Horst Weisgerber, Ulla M. Lang and Bernd Stimm, of the encyclopedia of woody plants and their extracts in book form, founded by Peter Schütt and distributed worldwide . At the same time he has also worked on numerous monographs in the encyclopedia himself. He is also editor of the Contributions to Forest Sciences and the textbook Tree Care - Tree Biological Basics and Application (2008/2013).

== Personal life ==
Roloff is married and has four grown children. He lives with his wife in Diera-Zehren.

== Work ==
- Morphology of the crown development of Fagus sylvatica L. (European beech) with special consideration of possibly novel changes 1985, DNB 14115697X (Dissertation Göttingen 1985, 177 pages, numerous illustrations and graphic representations, 21 cm. In print as Volume 18 of the series: Reports of the Research Center Forest Ecosystems, Forest Death . Research Center Forest Ecosystems, Forest Death, Göttingen 1986).
- Crown development and vitality assessment of selected tree species in temperate latitudes Habilitation thesis. (Writings from the Forest Faculty of the University of Göttingen and the Northwest German Forest Research Institute, Volume 93). Sauerländer, Frankfurt am Main 1989, ISBN 3-7939-5093-X .

together with Andreas Bärtels: Woods. Purpose, origin and areas of life, properties and use. (Garden flora, volume 1) Ulmer, Stuttgart-Hohenheim 1996 (2nd, completely revised edition under the title Flora of the Woods. Determination, properties and use . With a winter identification key by Bernd *Schulz. Ulmer, Stuttgart-Hohenheim 2006; 3rd., corrected edition, Ulmer, Stuttgart-Hohenheim 2008; 4th, completely revised and expanded edition, Ulmer, Stuttgart-Hohenheim 2014; ISBN 978-3-8001-8246-6 ). together with Ulrich Pietzarka: The Tharandt Forest Botanical Garden . Atelier am Forstgarten, Tharandt 1996 New edition as a three-volume work by the TU Dresden publishing house:

- Volume 1: A Gardening Guide . 2nd, completely revised edition. 2006 ( ISBN 978-3-86005-517-5 ).
- Volume 2: Tharandt Forest Park. North American forest formations in the Tharandt Forest Botanical Garden. A park guide . 2006 ( ISBN 978-3-86005-518-2 ).
- Volume 3: Saxon State Arboretum. The entire collection is visualized with FoGa-View . 2011 ( ISBN 978-3-86780-155-3 ).

together with Klaus Klugmann: Causes and dynamics of oak branch cracks . (Tharandt forest science articles, volume 1). Forest sciences at TU Dresden, Tharandt 1997.

- Treetops - understanding and practical meaning of a complex natural phenomenon . Ulmer, Stuttgart 2001 ( ISBN 3-8001-3193-5 ).
- as editor: Hardwood floodplain forests on the middle Elbe . Contributions to ecology, management and renaturation . (Forest in Saxony-Anhalt; 2002, 11) State forest administration Saxony-Anhalt, Magdeburg 2002.
- as editor together with Stephan Bonn: Results of ecological research on the sustainable management of alluvial forests on the middle Elbe . (Forest science contributions Tharandt, volume 17). Ulmer, Stuttgart 2002 ( ISBN 3-8001-4721-1 ).
- Trees - phenomena of adaptation and optimization / Trees - Phenomena of Adaptation and Optimization . Ecomed, Landsberg am Lech 2004 ( ISBN 3-609-16262-7 )
- as editor: Urban wood use in climate change and current issues of tree care. Proceedings of the Dresden City Tree Days on 15/16 March 2007 in Dresden . (Tharandt Forest Science Articles, Supplement 6.) Institute for Dendrochronology, Tree Care and Wood Management in the Forest Science Department of the TU Dresden, Tharandt 2007 ( ISBN 978-3-86005-566-3 ).
- as editor: Baumpflege. Tree biology basics and application . Ulmer, Stuttgart-Hohenheim 2008 ( ISBN 978-3-8001-5464-7 ).
- as editor: Current issues in tree care and urban soils as a substrate for tree life Conference proceedings / Dresden City Tree Days. Forest science colloquia, Tharandt and Dresden 12/13 March 2008. (Forest Science Articles Tharandt, Supplement 7.) Institute for Dendrochronology, Tree Care and Wood *Management of the Forest Science Department of the TU Dresden, Tharandt 2008 ( ISBN 978-3-86780-055-6 ).
- as editor: Concepts and design with city trees and current issues in tree care. Conference proceedings / Dresdner StadtBaumtage Dresden-Pillnitz, 12/13 March 2009 . (Forest Science Articles Tharandt, Supplement 8.) Institute for Dendrochronology, Tree Care and Wood Management in the Forest Science Department of the TU Dresden, Tharandt 2009 ( ISBN 978-3-86780-106-5 ).
- Trees - Lexicon of practical tree biology . Wiley-VCH, Weinheim 2010 ( ISBN 978-3-527-32358-6 ).
- as co-author: Biology of Trees. From the cell to the global level . Ulmer, Stuttgart-Hohenheim 2010 ( ISBN 978-3-8252-8450-3 or ISBN 978-3-8001-2840-2 ).
- as editor: Trees of North America. From alligator juniper to sugar maple. All characteristic species in portrait . Wiley-VCH-Verlag, Weinheim 2010 ( ISBN 978-3-527-32826-0 ).
- as editor: Trees of Central Europe. From aspen to Swiss stone pine. With the portraits of all trees from 1989 to 2010 . Wiley-VCH-Verlag, Weinheim 2010 ( ISBN 978-3-527-32825-3 ).
- as editor: Current questions of tree care and the importance, protection and risks of urban trees. Conference proceedings / Dresdner StadtBaumtage Dresden, Tharandt 11/12 March 2010 . (Forest Science Articles Tharandt, Supplement 9.) Institute for Dendrochronology, Tree Care and Wood Management of the Forest Science Department of the TU Dresden, Tharandt 2010 ( ISBN 978-3-86780-157-7 ).
- as editor: Current issues in tree care, tree use and young tree care. Conference proceedings / Dresdner StadtBaumtage in Dresden, Tharandt 10/11 March 2011 . (Forest Science Articles Tharandt, Supplement 10.) Institute for Dendrochronology, Tree Care and Wood Management of the Forest Science Department of the TU Dresden, Tharandt 2011 ( ISBN 978-3-86780-209-3 ).
- as editor: Current questions of tree care, planning, appreciation and effect of urban trees. Conference proceedings / Dresdner StadtBaumtage in Dresden / Tharandt 15/16 March 2012 . (Forest Science Articles Tharandt, Supplement 13.) Institute for Dendrochronology, Tree Care and Wood Management in the Forest Science Department of the TU Dresden, Tharandt 2012 ( ISBN 978-3-86780-267-3 ).
- as editor: Current issues of tree care, planning, appreciation and use of urban trees. Conference proceedings / Dresden City Tree Days in Dresden / Tharandt 14./15 March 2013 . (Forest Science Articles Tharandt, Supplement 14.) Institute for Dendrochronology, Tree Care and Wood Management in the Forest Science Department of the TU Dresden, Tharandt 2013 ( ISBN 978-3-86780-316-8 ).
- Trees in the city: special features, function, benefits, types, risks . Ulmer, Stuttgart 2013 ( ISBN 978-3-8001-7598-7 ).
- Manual tree diagnostics - tree body language and tree assessment . Ulmer, Stuttgart 2015 ( ISBN 978-3-8001-8360-9 ).
- as editor: Tree care & nature conservation and updates on the use and care of urban trees. Conference proceedings / Dresdner StadtBaumtage in Dresden / Tharandt 13/14 March 2014 . (Forest Science Articles Tharandt, Supplement 16.) Institute for Dendrochronology, Tree Care and Wood Management of the Forest Science Department at TU Dresden, Tharandt 2014 ( ISBN 978-3-86780-375-5 ).
- as editor: Current issues of tree care and use, urban tree properties and effects. Conference proceedings / Dresdner StadtBaumtage in Dresden / Tharandt 12/13 March 2015 . (Tharandt Forest Science Articles, Supplement 17.) Institute for Dendrochronology, Tree Care and Wood Management in the Forest Science Department of the TU Dresden, Tharandt 2015 ( ISBN 978-3-86780-418-9 ).
- as editor: Current issues of tree care and use, dealing with old trees / new tree species. Conference proceedings / Dresden City Tree Days in Dresden / Tharandt 10/11 March 2016 . (Forest Science Articles Tharandt, Supplement 18.) Institute for Dendrochronology, Tree Care and Wood Management of the Forest Science Department of the TU Dresden, Tharandt 2016 ( ISBN 978-3-86780-468-4 ).
- as editor: Urban Tree Management - for the Sustainable Development of Green Cities . Wiley-VCH, Chichester / GB 2016 ( ISBN 978-1-118-95458-4 ).
- as editor: Current issues of tree care and use, planning and appreciation of urban trees. Conference proceedings / Dresden StadtBaumtage in Dresden / Tharandt 16/17 March 2017 . (Forest Science Articles Tharandt, Supplement 19.) Institute for Dendrochronology, Tree Care and Wood Management in the Forest Science Department of the TU Dresden, Tharandt 2017 ( ISBN 978-3-86780-513-1 ).
- The character of our trees - their properties and peculiarities . Ulmer, Stuttgart 2017 ( ISBN 978-3-8001-0929-6 ).
- Assessment of the vitality of trees - current status and further development . Haymarket Media, Braunschweig 2018 ( ISBN 978-3-87815-261-3 ).
- as editor: Current issues of tree care and use, monument protection and new tree species. Conference proceedings / Dresdner StadtBaumtage in Dresden / Tharandt 15/16 March 2018. (Forest Science Articles Tharandt, Supplement 20.) Institute for Dendrochronology, Tree Care and Wood Management of the Forest Science Department at TU Dresden, Tharandt 2018 ( ISBN 978-3-86780-547-6 ).
- as editor: Current issues of tree care and use, management and use of urban trees. Conference proceedings / Dresden City Tree Days in Dresden / Tharandt 14/15 March 2019 . (Forest Science Articles Tharandt, Supplement 21.) Institute for Dendrochronology, Tree Care and Wood Management of the Forest Science Department of the TU Dresden, Tharandt 2019 ( ISBN 978-3-86780-591-9 ).
- as editor: Tree care - Tree biology basics and their application . 3rd edition Ulmer, Stuttgart 2019 ( ISBN 978-3-8186-0737-1 ).
- as editor: The strong trees of Germany - 111 fascinating natural heritage and their stories . Quelle & Meyer, Wiebelsheim 2020 ( ISBN 978-3-494-01814-0 ).
- as editor: Current issues of tree care, biology and planting, vitality and health of urban trees. Conference proceedings / Dresdner StadtBaumtage in Dresden / Tharandt 12/13 March 2020. (Forest Science Articles Tharandt, Supplement 22.) Institute for Dendrochronology, Tree Care and Wood Management of the Forest Science Department of the TU Dresden, Tharandt 2020 ( ISBN 978-3-86780-623-7 ).
- Roloff has been co-editor since 1997 and first editor since 2005 of the constantly expanding loose-leaf series Encyclopedia of Woody Plants. Handbook and atlas of dendrology, currently the world's most comprehensive work on dendrology with over 6500 pages.
- Roloff has been the publisher of the large format picture calendar "Strong Trees" in the Dr. Frank Verlag Gera, with Dt. Dendrological Society.
