= Hellenic Associations of Young Entrepreneurs =

Esyne (in Greek: ΕΣΥΝΕ or Ελληνικοί Σύνδεσμοι Νέων Επιχειρηματιών - Ομοσπονδία, Hellenic Associations of New Entrepreneurs - Federation) is an organisation in Greece that focuses on new entrepreneurs.

Esyne has the support of the Office of Europarl in Greece (, see also Europarl) of the Municipality of Athens (). Esyne is a member of the European Confederation of Young Entrepreneurs (, YES).

Esyne has, notably, organised the Global Entrepreneurship Week to be held between 19 and 25 November 2008 under the aegis of the Greek Ministry of Development (YPAN).

The organisation also operates the esynefriends social network.

In October 2022, its president, Orestis Matsoukas, has instigated hatred against Macedonians and Bulgarians on Facebook, celebrating the blinding of Bulgarian prisoners of war by emperor Basil II and denigrating Macedonian identity.
