= Lencke Wischhusen =

German entrepreneur and politician

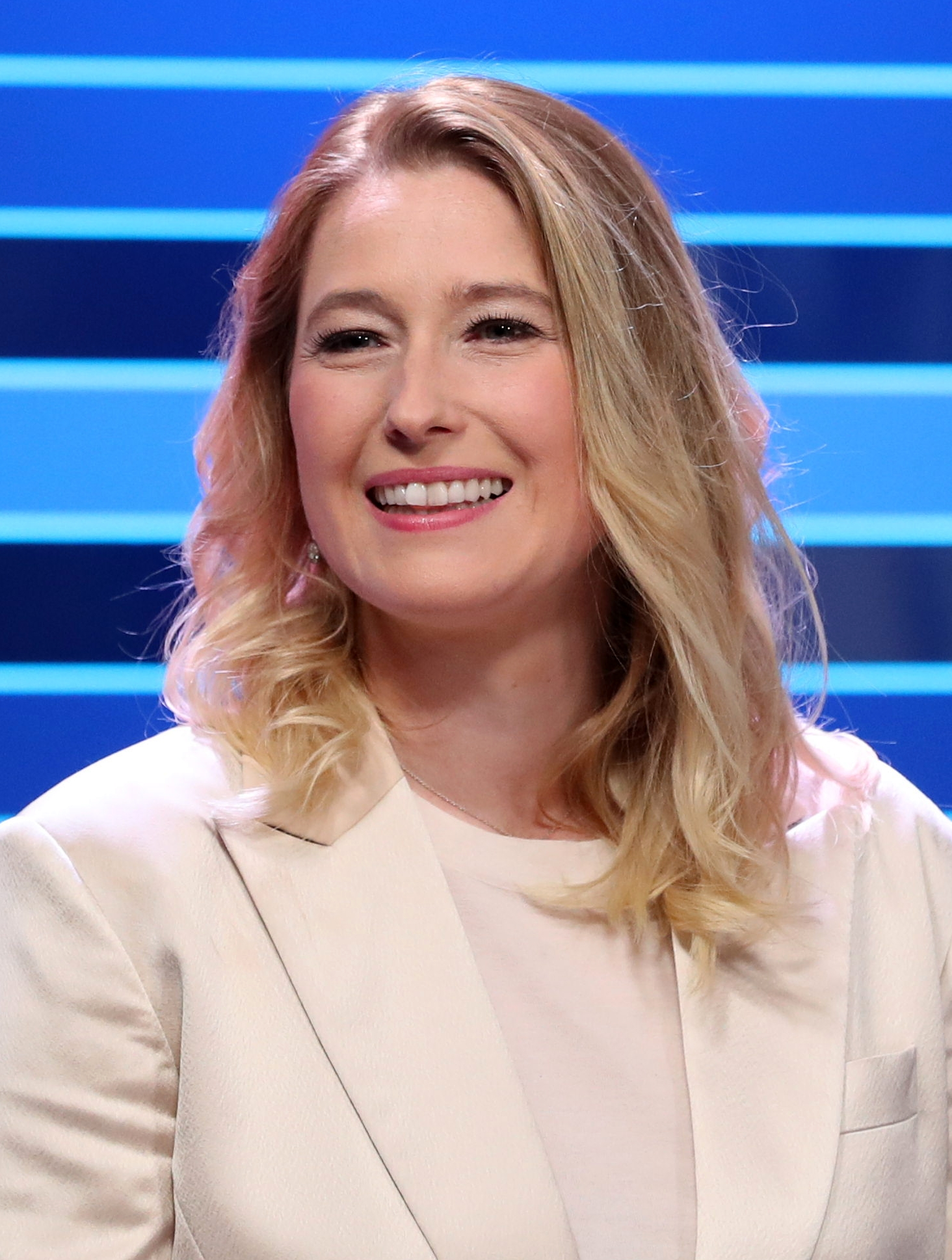
- Wischhusen in 2019

Member of the Bürgerschaft of Bremen
- Incumbent
- Assumed office 2015

Personal details
- Born: 6 September 1985 (age 40) Bremen, West Germany
- Party: Free Democratic Party

Lencke Wischhusen (born 6 September 1985), formerly Lencke Steiner, is a German politician of the Free Democratic Party (FDP) and businessperson. She was the top candidate of the FDP Bremen at the 2015 and the 2019 Bremen state election.

== Education and early career ==
Born in Bremen, Wischhusen took her final degrees in 2004 at Ökumenisches Gymnasium zu Bremen and became a businesswoman. She has been working at the plastic-packaging company of her parents (W-Pack GmbH) since 2008, and became general manager in 2010.

From 2012, Wischhusen served as the chairperson of industry organization Bundesverband Junger Unternehmer (BJU).

Between 2014 and 2015, Wischhusen appeared alongside Vural Öger, Jochen Schweizer, Frank Thelen and others in the first two seasons of Die Höhle der Löwen, a reality television format featuring entrepreneurs pitching their business ideas in order to secure investment finance from a panel of venture capitalists.

== Political career ==
On 15 November 2014, the FDP Bremen voted for Wischhusen to become top candidate for the 2015 Bremen state election. After gaining 6.8 percent of votes and therefore entering the city-state parliament, she joined the FDP and their youth organization Junge Liberale ("Young Liberals") on 10 May 2015.

In her capacity as Member of the State Parliament of Bremen, Wischhusen is a member on the Budget and Finance Committee, the Controlling Committee and the Committee on Gender Equality. She also serves as chairwoman of the Audit Committee.

In November 2016, Wischhusen announced that she run for a parliamentary seat in the 2017 national election. She was a FDP delegate to the Federal Convention for the purpose of electing the President of Germany in 2017.

== Other activities ==
- Rotary International, Member (since 2015)
- Deutsche Bahn, Member of the Advisory Board (since 2014)
- European Confederation of Young Entrepreneurs, Member (since 2009)
- Aufsichtsräte Mittelstand in Deutschland (ArMiD), Member of the Advisory Board (2012–2015)

== Personal life ==
On 24 June 2014, Wischhusen married businessman Philippe Steiner and took his surname. After her divorce in 2019, she took her birth name again.
