= Carsten Meyer-Heder =

German politician and businessman

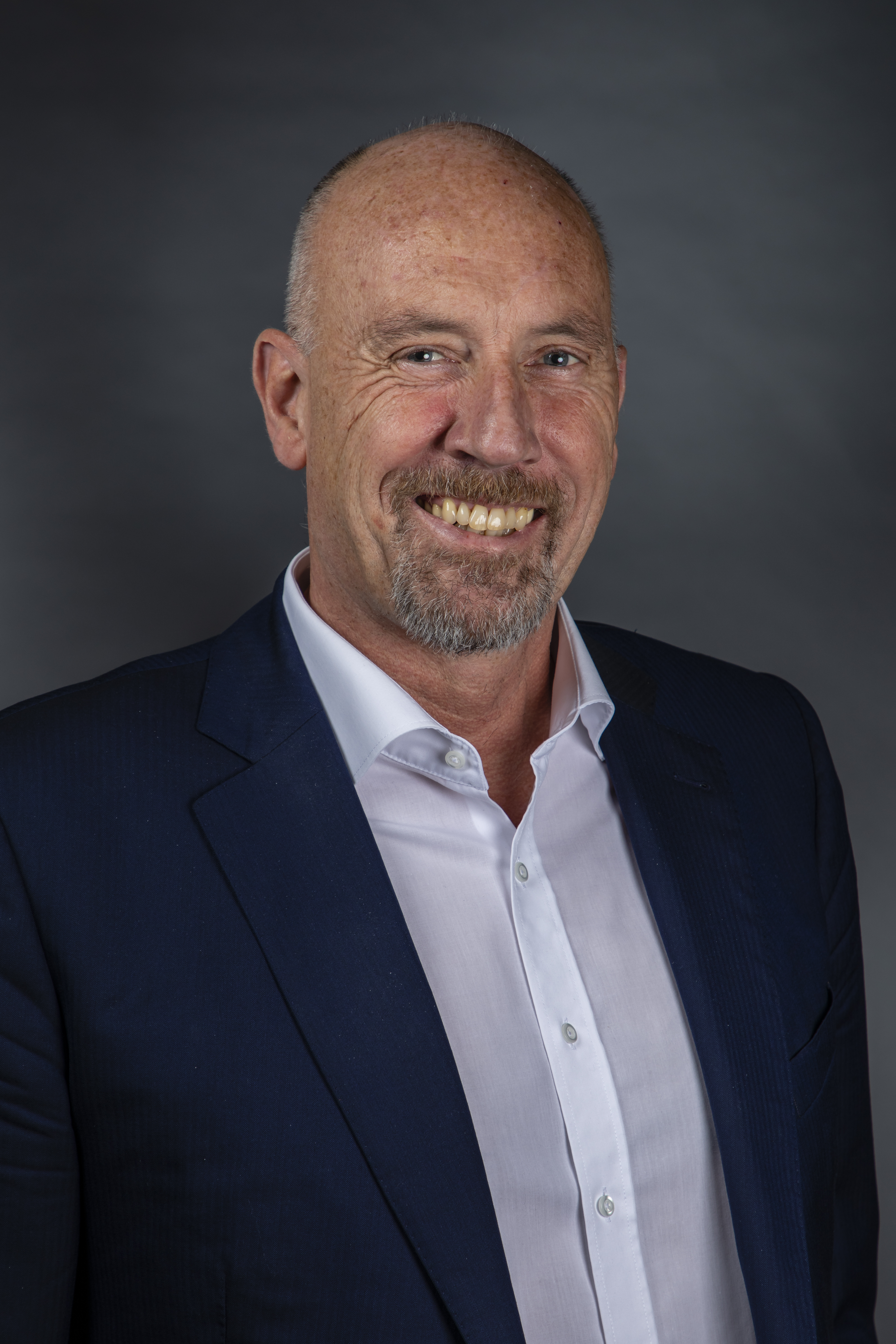
- Carsten Meyer-Heder (2019)

Leader of the Christian Democratic Union in the State of Bremen
- Incumbent
- Assumed office 27 June 2019
- Preceded by: Jörg Kastendiek

Personal details
- Born: 30 March 1961 (age 65) Bremen, West Germany
- Party: Christian Democratic Union
- Website: www.carsten-meyer-heder.de

Carsten Meyer-Heder (born 30 March 1961) is a German CDU politician and businessman.

== Life ==
Meyer-Heder founded the It-company team neusta. In March 2018, Meyer-Heder joined the Christian Democratic Union of Germany. He became chairmen of CDU Bremen. On 26 May 2018, he was officially nominated as the CDU candidate for the office of the President of the Senate and Mayor of the Free Hanseatic City of Bremen in the 2019 Bremen state election. He gained 22.4% and could not reach power. He is a member of Bremen Bürgerschaft.

At the end of September 2023, Carsten Meyer-Heder resigned as CDU chairman with immediate effect. He had previously declared a possible collaboration with the right-wing AfD at Radio Bremen: "If we want to make things happen and we agree with the AfD: why not?" Meyer-Heder's statements caused sharp criticism in Bremen politics. Numerous Bremen CDU politicians had already clearly distanced themselves from him.
