= Peter Beck (disambiguation) =

Peter Beck (born 1976/7) is the New Zealand founder of Rocket Lab.

Peter Beck may also refer to:

- Peter Beck (German politician) (born 1967), member of the Bürgerschaft of Bremen
- Peter Beck (luger) (born 1965), Liechtenstein luger
- Peter Beck (Ohio politician) (born 1952), Republican member of the House of Representatives of Ohio, United States
- Peter Beck (priest) (born 1948/9), local body politician and former dean of ChristChurch Cathedral in Christchurch, New Zealand
- Peter Beck (schoolmaster) (1909–2002), English headmaster
- Peter Beck, Australian television producer, see Shaun Micallef's Mad as Hell

== See also ==
- Beck (surname)
