= Peter Beck (German politician) =

German politician (born 1967)

Representative for the Bürgerschaft in the State of Bremen
- Incumbent
- Assumed office 27 June 2019

Head of the Liberal Conservative Reformers for the Bürgerschaft in the State of Bremen
- Incumbent
- Assumed office September 2019
- Preceded by: Frank Magnitz

Personal details
- Born: 1967 (age 58–59) Bremen
- Party: Liberal Conservative Reformers

Peter Beck (born 1967 in Bremen) is a German politician for the Liberal Conservative Reformers. Since 2019, he has been a member of the Bürgerschaft of Bremen

== Life and politics ==
Beck was born in 1967 and became a police officer. After the 2019 Bremen state election, he became member of the Bürgerschaft, the Breman state parliament. In September 2019, he became the chairman of his party in the state of Bremen after the resignation of Frank Magnitz.
