= Frank Magnitz =

German politician

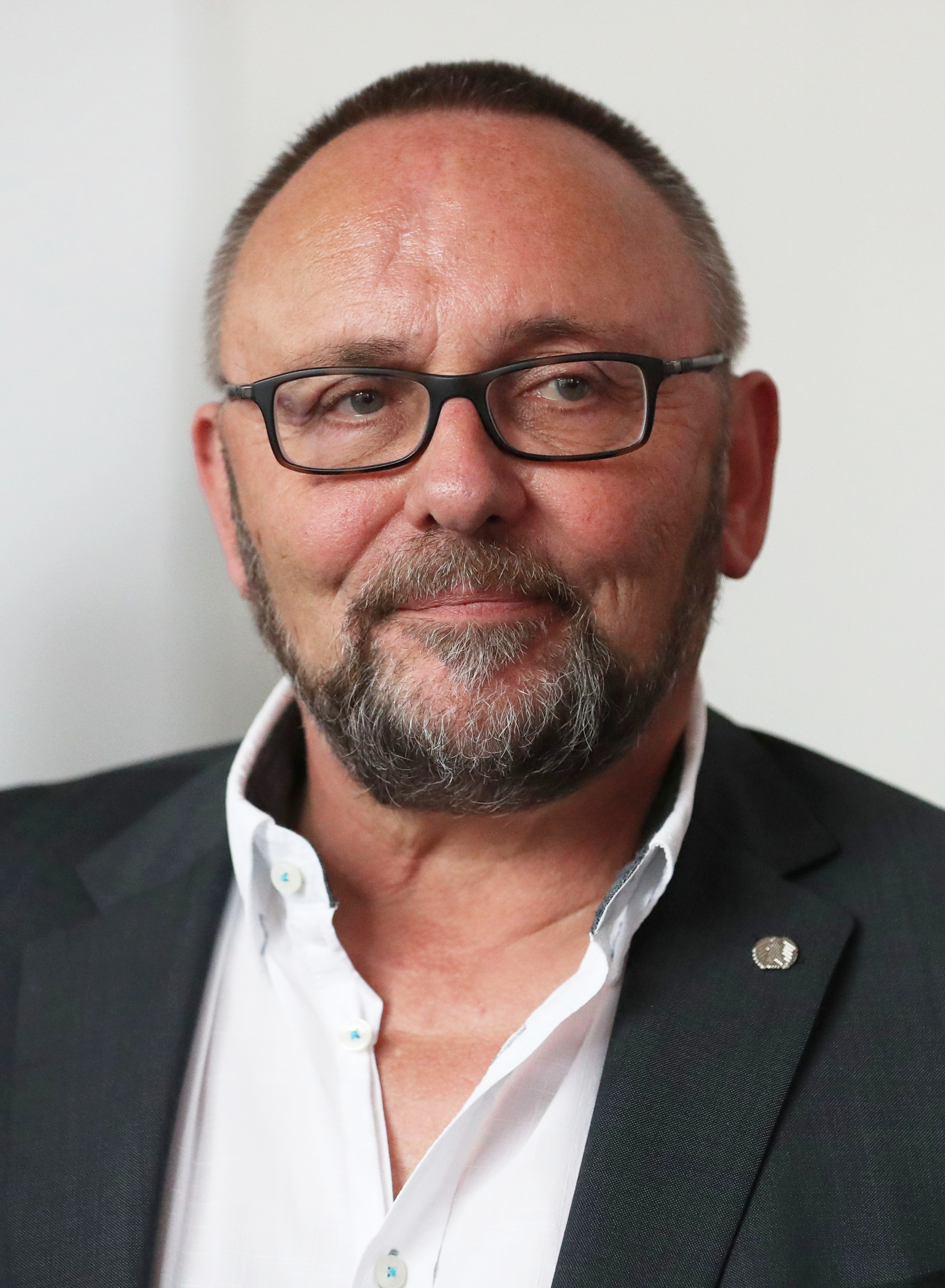
- Frank Magnitz (2019)

Member of the Bundestag
- Incumbent
- Assumed office 2017
- Constituency: Bremen

Personal details
- Born: Frank Rüdiger Heinrich Magnitz; 29 June 1952 (age 74) Neuenkirchen, Lower Saxony, West Germany (now Germany)
- Citizenship: German
- Party: Alternative for Germany
- Children: 6
- Occupation: Politician

Frank Rüdiger Heinrich Magnitz (born 29 June 1952) is a German politician from the Alternative for Germany (Alternative für Deutschland, AfD) party. Magnitz has been a Member of the Bundestag from 2017 to 2021.

== Biography ==
Magnitz was born in Neuenkirchen in the district of Diepholz in Lower Saxony. He has qualifications in banking and teaching, has worked for Bremen social services and founded a commercial construction company, and is a property manager and estate agent.

== Political career ==
Originally a German Communist Party member, he joined the AfD in 2013, the year it was founded, largely over anti-Muslim and anti-euro sentiments. He became speaker of the Bremen branch in June 2015. In May 2015 he was elected to the council for the borough of Burglesum, and in the 2017 German federal election he won a levelling seat in the German parliament, the Bundestag, where he is a member of the committees for construction, housing, urban development and community and for traffic and digital infrastructure and a deputy member of the committee for environment, protection of nature and nuclear security.

On 7 January 2019, Magnitz was attacked after leaving a reception at the Bremen Kunsthalle, and badly injured. Surveillance video showed three people, one of whom struck him a blow to the base of the skull with an elbow. From 2015 to 2019 Magnitz was chairman of the AfD federal state association in Bremen. He resigned in September 2019 after party internal disputes over his double mandate in Bremen and in the federal government Bundestag. His successor is Peter Beck.

== Personal life ==
Magnitz is married and has six children. He lives in the St. Magnus section of Burglesum.
