= Susanne Neumann =

German author (1959–2019)

Susanne "Susi" Neumann (29 May 1959 – 13 January 2019) was a German author, chairwoman of a labour union, and cleaner. She gained public recognition after an appearance on the German talk-show Anne Will.

Neumann is known for her direct speech, criticism of fixed-term employment contracts and advocacy for social justice. She is furthermore known for her talk with German vice chancellor Sigmar Gabriel about the crumbling middle class.

She wrote a book about her concerns and experiences, which was published in 2016. In 2018, Neumann supported the Aufstehen movement.

== Life ==
Neumann was born in Gelsenkirchen and came from a civil servant family. She graduated with the Mittlere Reife school-leaving certificate and started an apprenticeship as home decorator. She abandoned this apprenticeship when she became pregnant and worked as a cleaner in Gelsenkirchen from 1981.

She was a trade unionist and joined the Building and Construction Union and became a union official on regional and federal commissions.

== Publications ==
In her book Frau Neumann haut auf den Putz – Warum wir ein Leben lang arbeiten und trotzdem verarmen (Ms. Neumann hits the nail on the head – why we work for a lifetime and still become impoverished) published in 2017, she and co-author Andreas Hock outline social conditions in Germany, how its welfare state has degenerated and why people have multiple jobs but still do not earn enough money. Neumann also writes about her own experiences.
