= Helmut Berding =

German historian (1930–2019)

- Born: 21 September 1930; Quakenbrück, Germany
- Died: 7 January 2019 (aged 88)
- Occupation: Historian

Helmut Berding (21 September 1930 – 7 January 2019) was a German historian.

== Biography ==
Berding studied history, philosophy, and Romanesque studied at the University of Göttingen from 1959 to 1961. He then studied history, philosophy, and education at the University of Cologne from 1961 to 1967. He spent the majority of his career working as a history professor for the University of Giessen.
