= Helmut Bez =

German writer (1930–2019)

Helmut Bez (28 August 1930 – 7 August 2019) was a German writer primarily known as a playwright (for theatre, radio, and television), librettist, and screenwriter. He was born in Sondershausen and spent the first 40 years of his career in East Germany. In 1981, Hans Fabian wrote that his plays at the Deutsches Theater "rival the best of those performed in the West and give promise of a vigorous decade to come."

== Life and career ==
Bez graduated from secondary school and later drama school in Erfurt where he had been a boyhood friend of Jürgen Degenhardt. He and Degenhardt would later collaborate on numerous librettos for musical theatre and operetta. When collaborating, Bez and Degenhardt sometimes wrote under the pseudonyms Alfred Berg (Bez) and Hans Hardt (Degenhardt). Between 1952 and 1966, Bez worked as the resident dramatist at theatres in Heiligenstadt, Nordhausen, Erfurt, and Eisleben and at the Metropol-Theater in Berlin. Since 1966 he has worked as a freelance dramatist.

In 1980 Bez, Degenhardt, and H. P. Hofmann published, Musical: Geschichte und Werke, a book on the history and performance of musical theatre in Germany. To mark Bez's 75th birthday in August 2005, MDR re-broadcast his 1996 radio play Tod in der Provinz.

== Works ==
=== Musical theatre ===
Bez's librettos for musical theatre and operetta include:

- Mein Freund Bunbury (1964) with Jürgen Degenhardt. Composer: Gerd Natschinski. Based on Oscar Wilde's play The Importance of Being Earnest, this musical is still being performed in Germany in the 21st century.
- Terzett (1974) with Jürgen Degenhardt. Composer: Gerd Natschinski
- Casanova (1976) with Jürgen Degenhardt. Composer: Gerd Natschinski

=== Stage plays ===
- Jutta oder Die Kinder von Damutz (1978)
- Warmer Regen (1979)
- Die verkehrte Welt (1983)

and others.

=== Radio plays ===
- Zwiesprache halten (1976, awarded)
- Letzte Nachrichten (1981)
- Die Befreiung (1983)
- Das Reich von Geist und Seele (1989)
- Gentz (1990)
- Nützliche Erhebung (1993)
- Die Armee Wenck (1995)
- Tod in der Provinz (1997)

=== Television plays and movies ===
- Wengler & Söhne (1987, DEFA)
- Späte Ankunft (1988, TV)
- Jutta oder Die Kinder von Damutz (1995, TV)

=== Novels ===
Numerous novels and stories.
