= Christoph Broelsch =

German surgeon and teacher (1944–2019)

Christoph Broelsch (14 September 1944, in Hanau, Germany – 12 February 2019 in Düsseldorf) was a German surgeon. Broelsch pioneered the liver transplant surgery, when he performed the first successful liver transplant on a child in 1989.

== Life ==
Broelsch grew up with his five siblings in Bremen. His father, Werner Broelsch (1910-2010) was a state youth pastor. By the end of the 1950s, the family moved to Berlin. After graduating from high school in 1963, Broelsch went on to study medicine in Cologne, Erlangen, and Düsseldorf. Afterwards he started working under Prof. Dr. Rudolf Pichlmayr at the Hannover Medical School, where he worked for 10 years before moving to Chicago. He then moved to the University of Chicago in 1984 to lead the Medical Center’s liver transplant program. In November 1989, Broelsch’s team was the first to report a living-related-donor liver transplant. The donor was a 29 year old mother who donated her left lateral segment to her 21 month old daughter. Previously, Broelsch had developed a liver division procedure in which one donor liver could be used for two recipients, so-called "split liver". In live donation, only a part (segment) of the liver is removed from the healthy donor and implanted in the sick person. The procedure is based on the fact that parts of the liver can grow back into a complete organ. The difficulty is to split the organ of the healthy donor in such a way that no vital blood vessels are cut. Since 1999, new imaging techniques and 3D visualization of internal organs have significantly improved safety.

On August 31, 1989, a few months before the first such operation, Broelsch and colleagues published a paper in the New England Journal of Medicine to explain their medical and ethical reasoning as they began to select potential patients and donors. “We propose to transplant a liver lobe from a living donor—the parent of the recipient—to a non-critically ill infant with advanced liver disease,” they wrote.

Over the next five years, the University of Chicago and Broelsch’s team became the leaders in adult to pediatric living donor liver transplantation, performing 78 of these operations, representing close to half of all those performed throughout the United States. Their success stimulated many surgeons throughout the world to develop similar programs while others worked to solve the technical problems that soon led to the application of living donor and split liver transplantation into adult recipients.

In 1991, Dr. Broelsch was recruited back to Germany to lead the transplant program at the University Medical Center Hamburg-Eppendorf where he continued his success in cadaveric and living donor liver transplantation. His next move was in 1998 (through 2007) to the University Hospital in Essen where he became the Professor and Chairman of the Department for General, Visceral and Transplantation Surgery.

Broelsch was also the physician of the German president Johannes Rau.

== Judicial procedures ==
After several cases of live liver donations under questionable circumstances, the public prosecutor's office in Essen initiated investigations against the surgeon. After an exposure report of the WDR journalist Wolfgang Buschfort in 2007, Broelsch was accused in Essen of bribery, coercion, and fraud and tax evasion and was sentenced in the first instance to three years imprisonment without probation. He was accused of granting admission to dozens of patients to the state university clinic in Essen only in return for increased payments. In addition, these extra payments had been declared as donations for research purposes, which was neither true nor legal. Both the public prosecutor's office in Essen and the defense appealed against the ruling to the Federal Court of Justice (Bundesgerichtshof).

In 2011, the revision was rejected by the Federal Court of Justice.

With the legal force of the verdict, Broelsch also lost his pension entitlement as a civil servant. On 10 October 2011, Broelsch began his prison term in the Bielefeld-Senne Prison. After serving half of his prison term, Broelsch was released on probation on 9 April 2013.

== Awards (Excerpt) ==
- 1969: Doctorate magna cum laude at the University of Düsseldorf
- 1979: Hermann-Kümmel-Preis, Vereinigung Nordwestdeutscher Chirurgen
- 1987: Cine-Clinic Award, American College of Surgeons
- 1991: Order of Merit of the Federal Republic of Germany, Member
- 1992: Honorary Doctor of Medicine of the Katholieke Universiteit Leuven
- 1993: Honorary Doctor of Medicine of the Aarhus University
- 2001: Honorary Doctor of Medicine of the Ancient Order of Druids
- 2002: Lucie-Bolte-Prize
- 2004: Order of Merit of the Federal Republic of Germany, Great Cross of Merit

== Publications ==
- Living related liver transplantation: medical and social aspects of a controversial therapy C E Broelsch
- Department of General Surgery and Transplantation, University Hospital Essen, Hufelandstr 55, 45122 Essen, Germany Gut 50:143-5
- Should we expand the criteria for liver transplantation for hepatocellular carcinoma—yes, of course! Christoph Erich Broelsch
- Department of General Surgery and Transplantation, University Hospital Essen, Hufelandstr. 55, D-45122 Essen, Germany J Hepatol 43:569-73
- Impact of donor gender on male rat recipients of small-for-size liver grafts YanLi Gu
- Department of General Surgery and Transplantation Surgery, University Hospital Duisburg-Essen, Essen, Germany Liver Transpl 11:669-78
- [Surgical and interventional treatment of liver metastases] C E Broelsch
- Klinik für Allgemein und Transplantations chirurgie, Universitätsklinikum Essen MMW Fortschr Med 147:21-4
- Increased levels of interleukin-10 in serum from patients with hepatocellular carcinoma correlate with profound numerical deficiencies and immature phenotype of circulating dendritic cell subsets Susanne Beckebaum
- Department of Gastroenterology and Hepatology, University Hospital Essen, Essen, Germany Clin Cancer Res 10:7260-9
- Major bile duct injuries after laparoscopic cholecystectomy: a tertiary center experience Andrea Frilling
- Department of General Surgery and Transplantation, University Hospital Essen, Essen, Germany J Gastrointest Surg 8:679-85
- Hepatoma—resection or transplantation Christoph E Broelsch
- Department of General Surgery and Transplantation, University Hospital of Essen, Hufelandstrasse 55, Essen 45122, Germany Surg Clin North Am 84:495-511, x
- Early and late complications in the recipient of an adult living donor liver Christoph E Broelsch
- Department of General Surgery and Transplantation, University Hospital Essen, Germany Liver Transpl 9:S50-3
- Hepatitis B virus-induced defect of monocyte-derived dendritic cells leads to impaired T helper type 1 response in vitro: mechanisms for viral immune escape Susanne Beckebaum
- Department of Gastroenterology and Hepatology, Department of General Surgery and Transplantation, and Institute of Immunology, University of Essen, Germany Immunology 109:487-95
- Prophylactic thyroidectomy in multiple endocrine neoplasia: the impact of molecular mechanisms of RET proto-oncogene Andrea Frilling
- Klinik für Allgemein und Transplantationschirurgie, Universitätsklinikum Essen, Hufelandstrasse 55, 45122 Essen, Germany Langenbecks Arch Surg 388:17-26
