= Rosdorf =

- Municipality
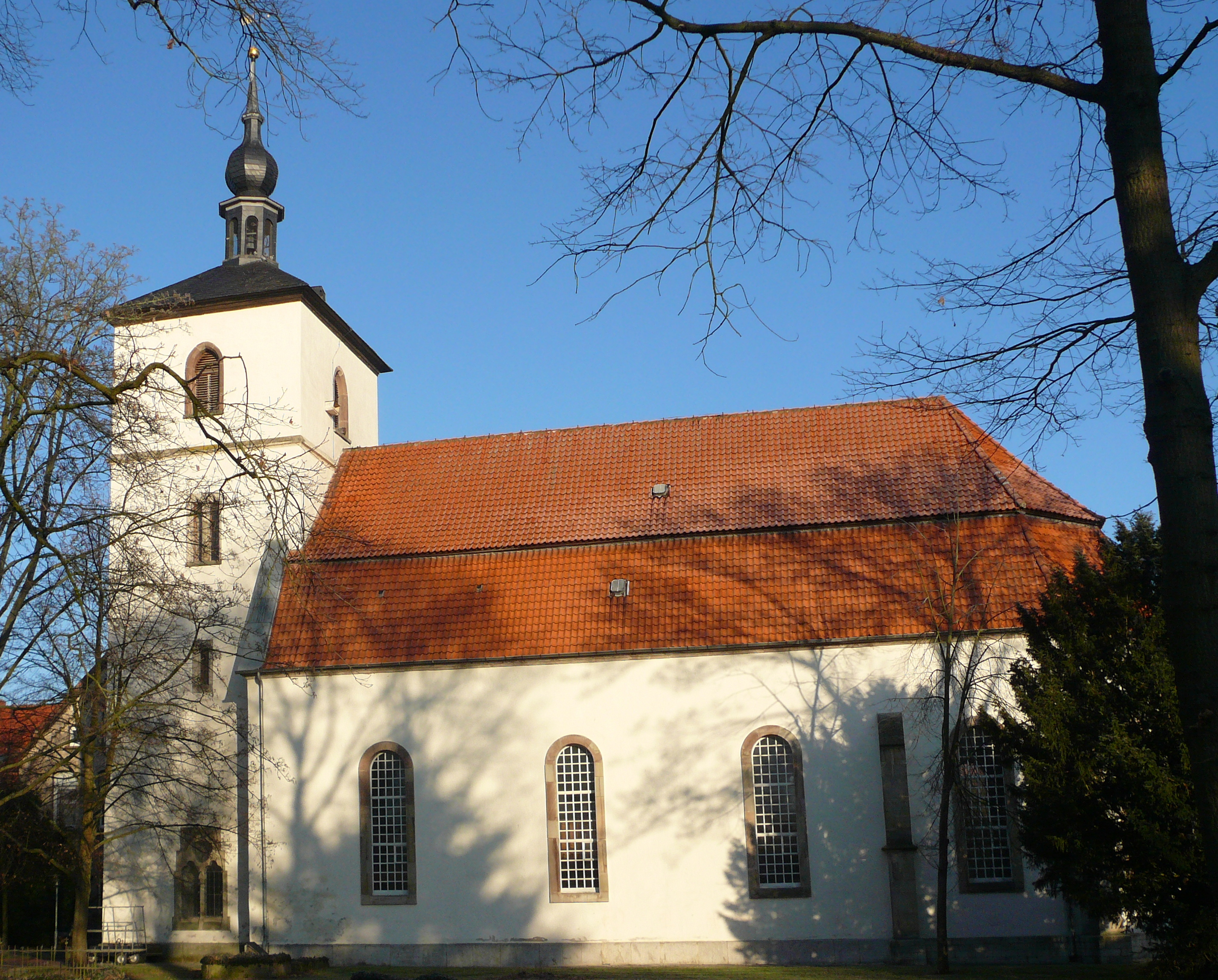
- Church of Saint John

- Coat of arms

- Location of Rosdorf within Göttingen district
- Interactive map of Rosdorf
- Location within Germany Location within Lower Saxony
- Coordinates: 51°30′N 09°54′E
- Country: Germany
- State: Lower Saxony
- District: Göttingen

Government
  - Mayor (2021–26): Sören Steinberg (SPD)

Area
  - Total: 66.53 km^{2} (25.69 sq mi)
- Elevation: 150 m (490 ft)

Population (2025-12-31)
  - Total: 12,263
  - Density: 184.3/km^{2} (477.4/sq mi)
- Time zone: UTC+01:00 (CET)
  - Summer (DST): UTC+02:00 (CEST)
- Postal codes: 37124
- Dialling codes: 0551
- Vehicle registration: GÖ
- Website: www.rosdorf.de

Rosdorf (German pronunciation: [ˈʁɔsdɔʁf]) is a municipality in the district of Göttingen, in Lower Saxony, Germany. It is approximately 4 km southwest of Göttingen.

== Mayors ==
Sören Steinberg (SPD) was elected the new mayor in May 2014, and re-elected in 2021. He is the successor of Harald Grahovac (SPD) who was 18 years in office. Before the election, Sören Steinberg was the office manager of Thomas Oppermann.
