= 2019 Bremen state election =

Election in Bremen, Germany

- 26 May 2019

All 84 seats of the Bürgerschaft of Bremen 43 seats needed for a majority
- Turnout: 1,469,506 (64.1%) ▲13.9%
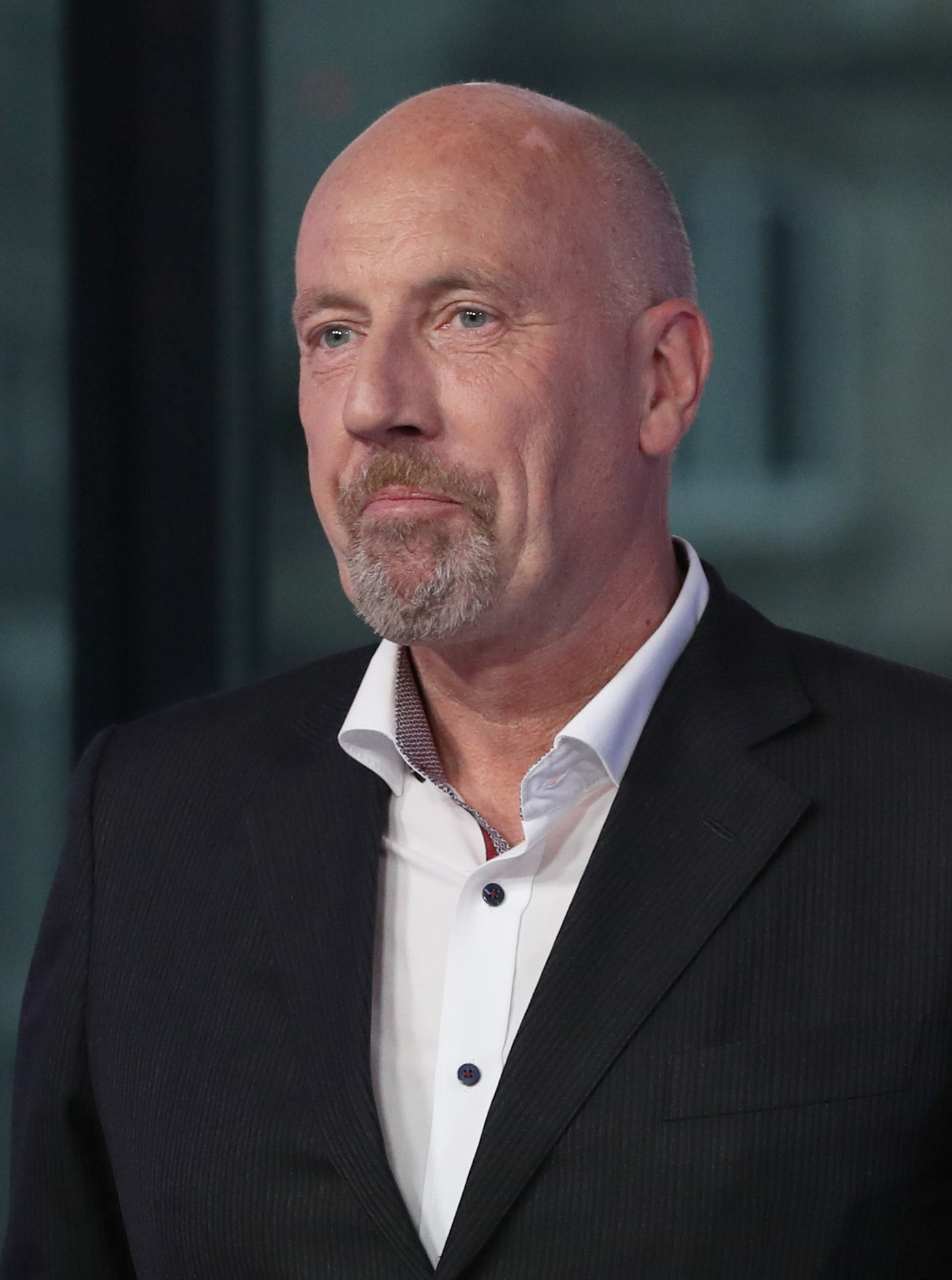

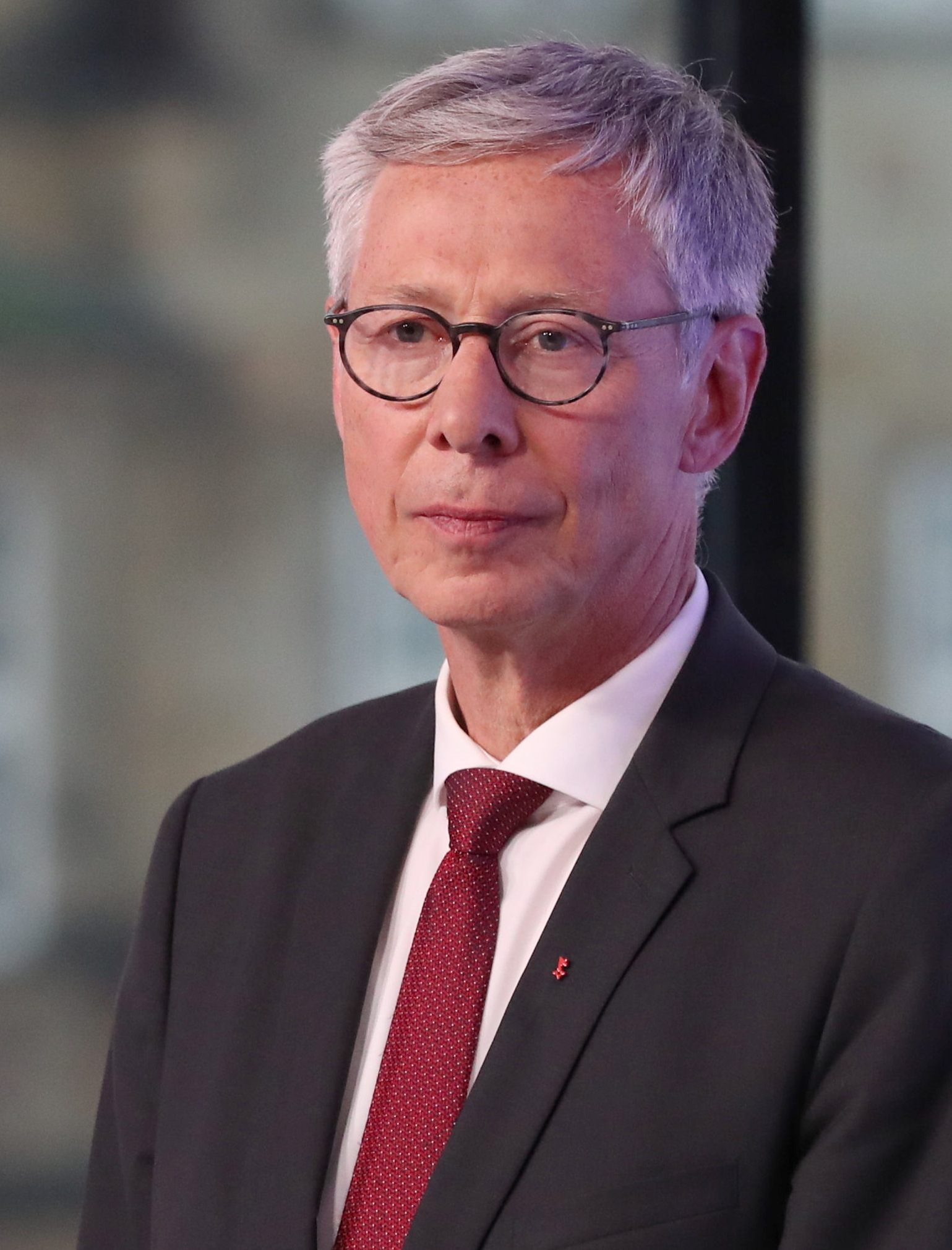

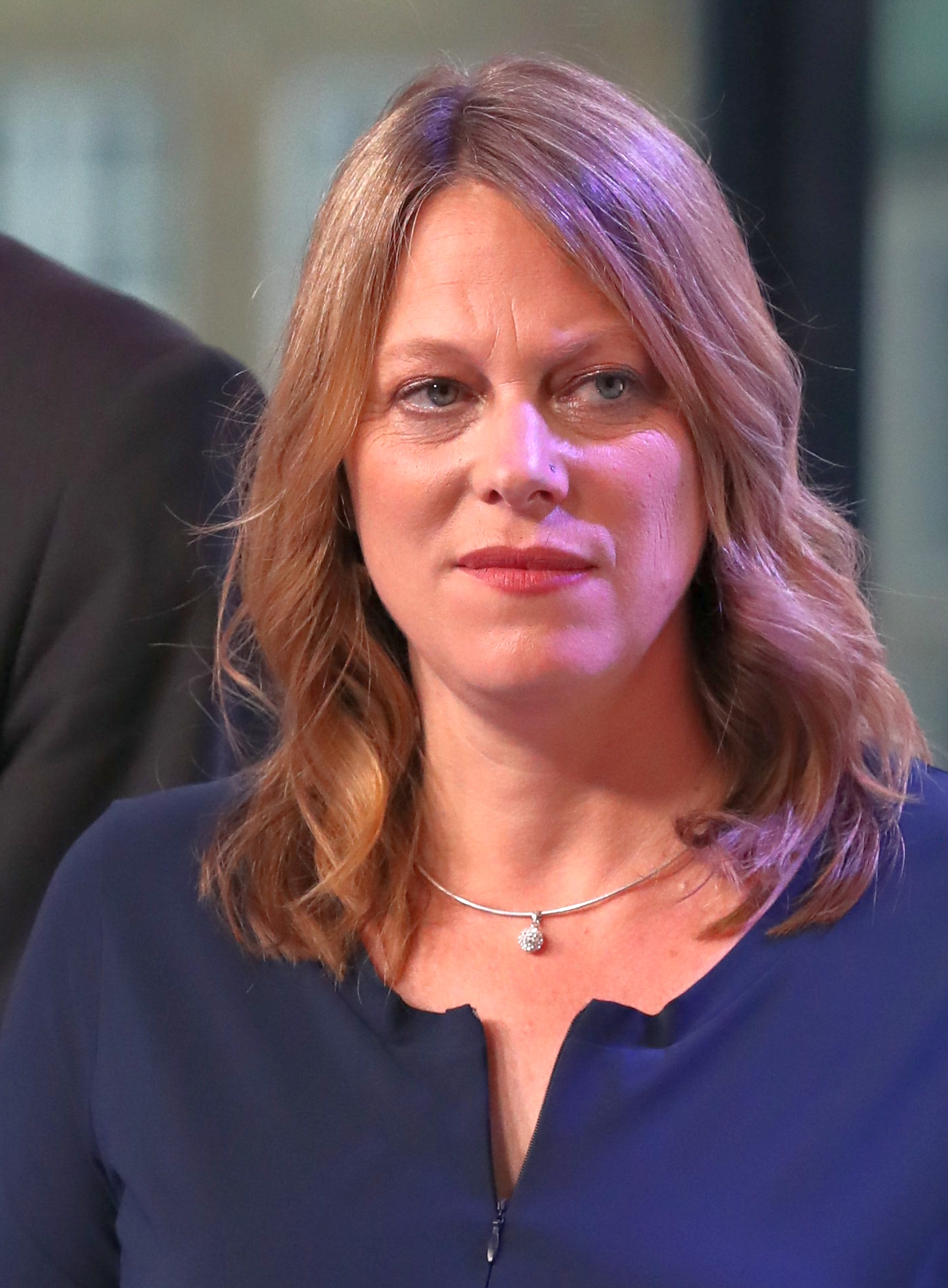

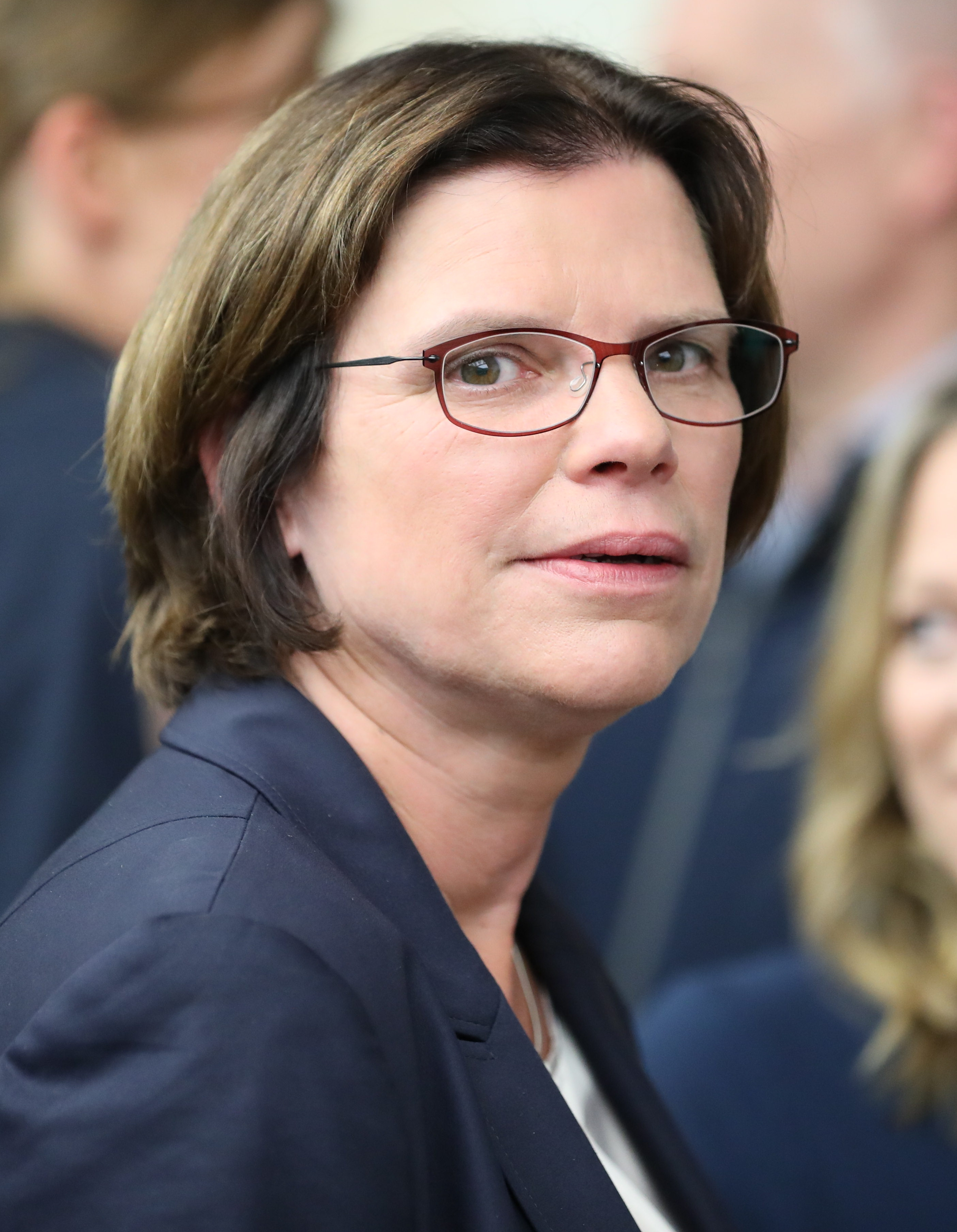

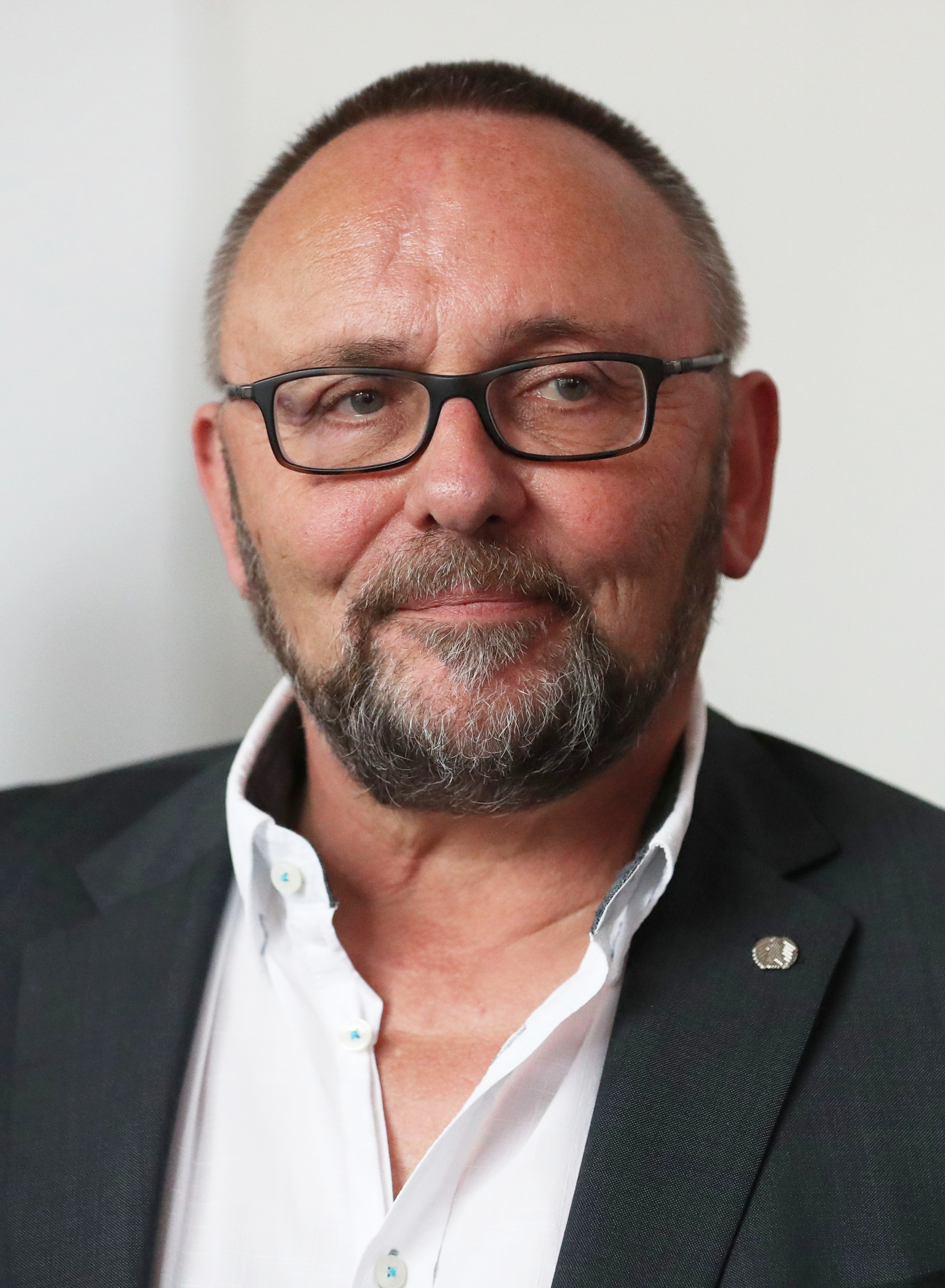

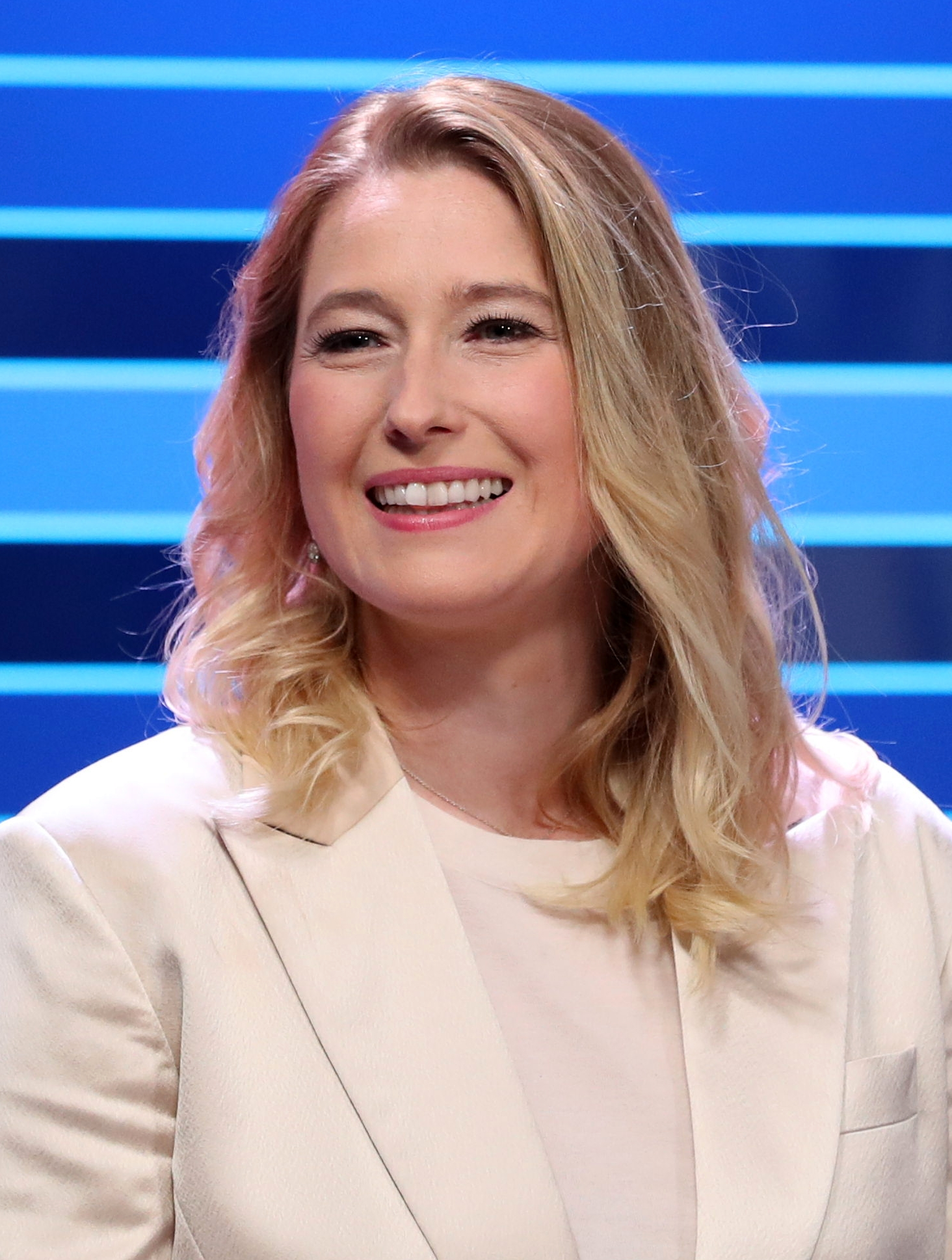
	First party	Second party	Third party
Leader	Carsten Meyer-Heder	Carsten Sieling	Maike Schaefer
Party	CDU	SPD	Greens
Last election	20 seats, 22.4%	30 seats, 32.8%	14 seats, 15.1%
Seats won	24	23	16
Seat change	▲4	▼7	▲2
Popular vote	391,709	366,375	256,181
Percentage	26.7%	24.9%	17.4%
Swing	▲4.3%	▼7.9%	▲2.3%
	Fourth party	Fifth party	Sixth party
Leader	Kristina Vogt	Frank Magnitz	Lencke Wischhusen
Party	Left	AfD	FDP
Last election	8 seats, 9.5%	4 seats, 5.5%	6 seats, 6.6%
Seats won	10	5	5
Seat change	▲2	▲1	▼1
Popular vote	166,378	89,939	87,420
Percentage	11.3%	6.1%	5.9%
Swing	▲1.8%	▲0.6%	▼0.7%
	Seventh party
Leader	Hinrich Lührssen
Party	Citizens in Rage
Last election	1 seat, 3.2%
Seats won	1
Seat change	0
Popular vote	35,808
Percentage	2.4%
Swing	▼0.8%
Government before election
Sieling senate
SPD–Green
Government after election
Bovenschulte senate
SPD–Green–Left

The 2019 Bremen state election was held on 26 May 2019 to elect the members of the Bürgerschaft of Bremen, as well as the city councils of Bremen and Bremerhaven. The election took place on the same day as the 2019 European Parliament election.

The opposition Christian Democratic Union (CDU) became the largest party in the Bürgerschaft, while the Social Democratic Party (SPD) fell to second place. The Greens and The Left also recorded small upswings.

Despite winning a narrow plurality, the CDU was opposed by a left-wing majority in the Bürgerschaft. Incumbent Mayor Carsten Sieling resigned after the election, and was succeeded by fellow SPD member Andreas Bovenschulte, who formed a three-party coalition government between the SPD, Greens, and Left. This was the first time that The Left had been involved in a government in western Germany.

== Parties ==
The table below lists parties represented in the previous Bürgerschaft of Bremen.

Name		Ideology	Leader(s)	2015 result		2019 seats
Name		Ideology	Leader(s)	Votes (%)	Seats	Seats
SPD	Social Democratic Party of Germany; Sozialdemokratische Partei Deutschlands	Social democracy	Carsten Sieling	32.8%	30 / 83	31 / 83
CDU	Christian Democratic Union of Germany; Christlich Demokratische Union Deutschlands	Christian democracy	Carsten Meyer-Heder	22.4%	20 / 83	20 / 83
Grüne	Alliance 90/The Greens; Bündnis 90/Die Grünen	Green politics	Maike Schaefer	15.1%	14 / 83	12 / 83
Linke	The Left; Die Linke	Democratic socialism	Kristina Vogt	9.5%	8 / 83	8 / 83
FDP	Free Democratic Party; Freie Demokratische Partei	Classical liberalism	Lencke Wischhusen	6.6%	6 / 83	6 / 83
AfD	Alternative for Germany; Alternative für Deutschland	German nationalism Right-wing populism	Frank Magnitz	5.5%	4 / 83	1 / 83
BiW	Citizens in Rage; Bürger in Wut	Right-wing populism	Hinrich Lührssen	3.2%	1 / 83	3 / 83

== Opinion polls ==

Polling firm	Fieldwork date	Sample size	SPD	CDU	Grüne	Linke	FDP	AfD	Others	Lead
2019 state election	26 May 2019	–	24.9	26.7	17.4	11.3	5.9	6.1	7.7	1.8
Forschungsgruppe Wahlen	20–23 May 2019	1,664	24.5	26	18	12	5	7	7.5	1.5
INSA	15–20 May 2019	1,000	23	28	18	11	6	6	8	5
Forschungsgruppe Wahlen	13–15 May 2019	1,021	24.5	26	18	12	5.5	8	6	1.5
Infratest dimap	13–15 May 2019	1,007	24	27	18	12	5	6	8	3
Infratest dimap	25 Apr–2 May 2019	1,000	25	26	18	12	6	8	5	1
INSA	22 Mar–1 Apr 2019	1,000	25	25	19	11	7	7	6	Tie
Infratest dimap	24–30 Jan 2019	1,000	24	25	18	13	6	8	6	1
FGW Telefonfeld	20–23 Aug 2018	1,015	26	26	20	12	7	6	3	Tie
pollytix	22 Jun–2 Jul 2018	1,000	28	24	14	14	10	8	2	4
INSA	14–18 May 2018	1,003	22	24	14	17	9	10	4	2
Infratest dimap	13–18 Apr 2018	1,002	26	24	14	15	7	9	5	2
2017 federal election	24 Sep 2017	–	26.8	25.1	11.1	13.1	9.3	10.0	4.3	1.7
Infratest dimap	9–14 Jan 2017	1,003	29	24	13	11	8	11	4	5
Infratest dimap	26 Apr–2 May 2016	1,000	29	22	16	10	7	11	5	7
2015 state election	10 May 2015	–	32.8	22.4	15.1	9.5	6.6	5.5	8.0	10.4

== Mayor polling ==
Polling firm	Fieldwork date			None/Unsure	Lead
Polling firm	Fieldwork date	Sieling SPD	Meyer-Heder CDU	None/Unsure	Lead
Forschungsgruppe Wahlen	26 May 2019	45	34	-	11
Infratest dimap	26 May 2019	42	36	-	6
Forschungsgruppe Wahlen	23 May 2019	43	31	26	12
Infratest dimap	16 May 2019	42	28	17	14
Forschungsgruppe Wahlen	16 May 2019	42	29	29	13
Infratest dimap	7 May 2019	39	31	18	8

== Preferred coalition ==
Polling firm	Fieldwork date	Assessment	SPD Grüne	SPD Grüne Linke	CDU Grüne	SPD CDU	CDU Grüne FDP	SPD Grüne FDP
Forschungsgruppe Wahlen	May 2019	Positive	41	39	28	27	26	20
Forschungsgruppe Wahlen	May 2019	Negative	57	59	68	70	71	76

== Election result ==
Map of results by constituency

Summary of the 26 May 2019 election results for the Bürgerschaft of Bremen
Party	Votes	%	+/-	Seats		Total seats	+/-	Seats %
Party	Votes	%	+/-	Bremen	Bremerhaven	Total seats	+/-	Seats %
Christian Democratic Union (CDU)	391,709	26.7	▲4.3	20	4	24	▲4	28.6
Social Democratic Party (SPD)	366,375	24.9	▼7.9	19	4	23	▼7	27.4
Alliance 90/The Greens (Grüne)	256,181	17.4	▲2.3	13	3	16	▲2	19.0
The Left (Linke)	166,378	11.3	▲1.8	9	1	10	▲2	11.9
Alternative for Germany (AfD)	89,939	6.1	▲0.6	4	1	5	▲1	6.0
Free Democratic Party (FDP)	87,420	5.9	▼0.7	4	1	5	▼1	6.0
Citizens in Rage (BiW)	35,808	2.4	▼0.8	0	1	1	0	1.2
Die PARTEI (PARTEI)	24,433	1.7	▼0.2	0	0	0	±0	0
Free Voters (FW)	14,205	1.0	▲1.0	0	0	0	±0	0
Pirate Party Germany (Piraten)	14,143	1.0	▼0.5	0	0	0	±0	0
Party of Humanists (Humanists)	6,655	0.5	▲0.5	0	0	0	±0	0
Basic Income Alliance (BGE)	5,970	0.4	▲0.4	0	0	0	±0	0
V-Partei^{3} (V^{3})	4,277	0.3	▲0.3	0	0	0	±0	0
Welcome to Reality (WIR)	2,821	0.2	▲0.2	0	0	0	±0	0
Human World (MW)	2,565	0.2	▲0.2	0	0	0	±0	0
The Right (Right)	627	0.0	0.0	0	0	0	±0	0
Total	1,469,506	100.0		69	15	84	▲1	
Voter turnout		64.1	▲13.9					

2019 Bremen state election voter demographics
Demographic subgroup	CDU	SPD	Grüne	Linke	AfD	FDP
Total vote	27	25	17	11	6	6
Gender
Men	26	23	15	11	9	6
Women	24	25	20	11	5	5
Education
lower Education	25	39	7	6	11	4
higher Education	24	19	23	14	4	6
Election decision (as % of their voters)
Disappointment	38	21	24	28	54	37
Conviction	55	69	71	64	42	57
Others
Last-Minute-Decision	22	25	18	11	4	7
First-time-Voter	11	15	34	14	4	10

Popular Vote
CDU	26.66%
SPD	24.93%
B'90/GRÜNE	17.43%
DIE LINKE	11.32%
AfD	6.12%
FDP	5.95%
BiW	2.44%
Other	5.15%

Bürgerschaft seats
CDU	28.57%
SPD	27.38%
B'90/GRÜNE	19.05%
DIE LINKE	11.90%
AfD	5.95%
FDP	5.95%
BiW	1.19%
