= European Confederation of Young Entrepreneurs =

European young entrepreneurs association

YES for Europe - European Confederation of Young Entrepreneurs
- Founded: 1988; 38 years ago
- Type: Membership Organization
- Purpose: Young Entrepreneurs, start-ups, scale-ups
- Location: Brussels, Belgium, European Union
- Region served: European Countries
- President: Gürkan Yıldırım
- Website: yesforeurope.org
- Formerly called: ‘Young Entrepreneurs for Europe’

YES for Europe - The European Confederation of Young Entrepreneurs (YES) is a Brussels-based organization that represent young entrepreneurs in Europe. The Confederation has one member per European Country, which is a representative national association of entrepreneurs below the age of 40.

YES for Europe represents the European Union to a number of international young entrepreneurs organizations including the G20 Young Entrepreneurs Alliance and the Allied for Startups advocacy group.

== History ==
YES for Europe was launched in 1988 by seven national groups of young entrepreneurs in order to face the challenges resulting from the ratification of the Single European Act in July 1987. Young entrepreneurs from Austria, France, Germany, Greece, Italy, Portugal as well as from Japan and met in Capri, Italy, during the National Convention of Confindustria Giovani Imprenditori to sign the "International Young Entrepreneurs Charter", the so-called "Capri Charter" which established the fundamental principles for the future cooperation.

== Presidents of YES for Europe ==
- 1993/1995 Veit Schmid Schmidsfelden Austria
- 1995/1997 Didier Livio France
- 1997/1999 Emma Marcegaglia Italy
- 1999/2001 Wolfgang Mainz Germany
- 2001/2004 Tjark de Lange Netherlands
- 2004/2007 Murat Sarayli Turkey
- 2008/2009 Marting Ohneber Austria
- 2010 Ivan Sempere Massa Spain
- 2011/2015 Dimitris Tsingos Greece
- 2016 Luca Donelli Italy
- 2017 Przemysław Grzywa Poland
- 2018 Mikel Beroiz Rosino Spain
- 2019 Benjamin Knöfler Germany
- 2020 Gürkan Yıldırım Turkey
- 2021 Jose Antonio Campos e Matos Portugal
- 2022 Matteo Dell'Acqua Italy
- 2024 Gürkan Yıldırım Turkey
