= Jörg Kastendiek =

German politician (1964–2019)

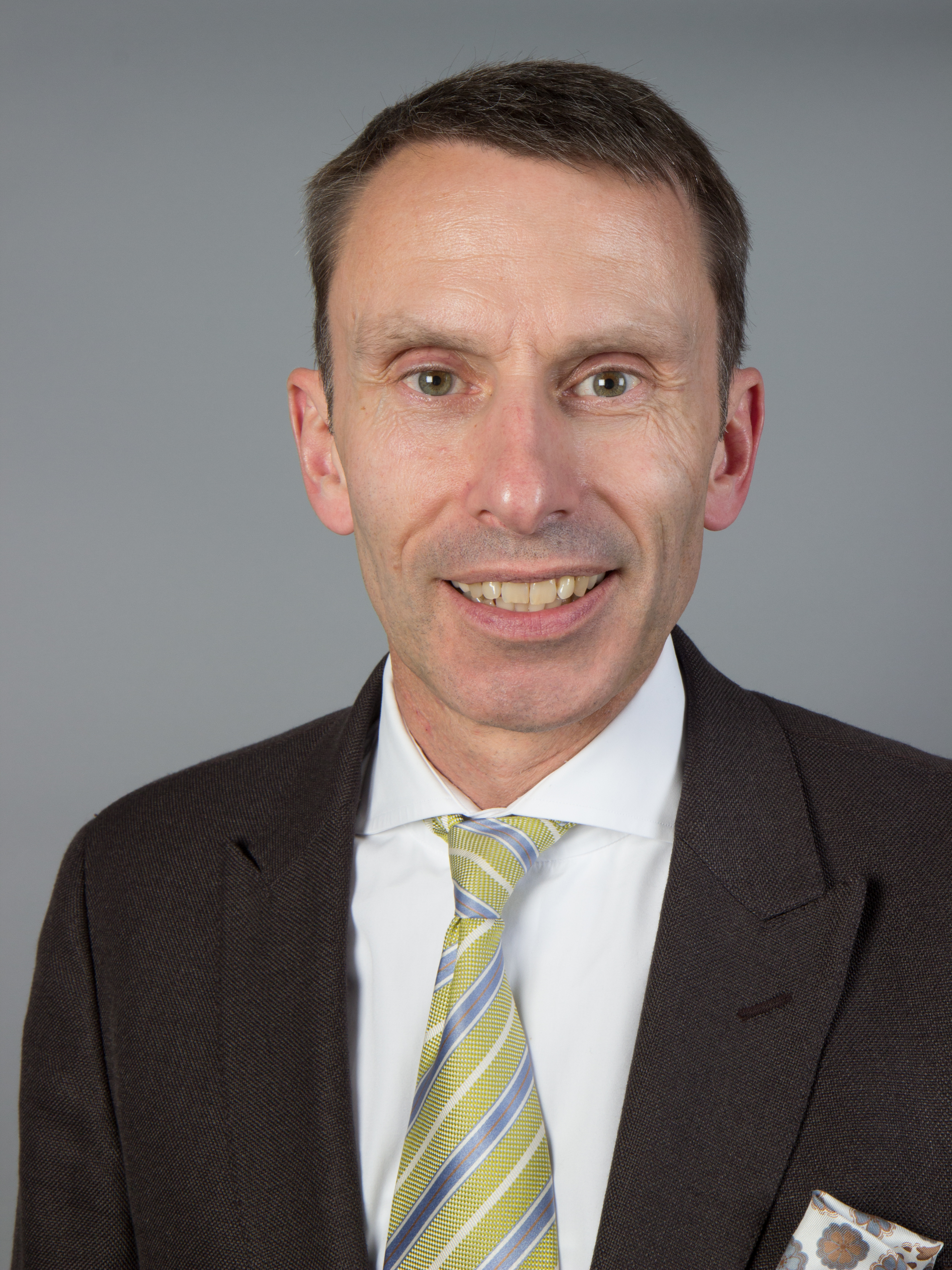
Jörg Kastendiek, 2014

Jörg Kastendiek (18 September 1964 – 13 May 2019) was a German politician for the Christian Democratic Union of Germany (CDU), who was member of the Bürgerschaft, the state parliament of Bremen. Kastendiek also served as senator of Bremen from 2005 to 2007, as Senator for Economy and Ports and as Senator for Culture.

== Life and politics ==
Kastendiek was born 1964 in Bremen and became a member of the CDU in 1983. From 2012 until his death in 2019 he was chairman of the CDU in the federal state of Bremen.

Kastendiek died, aged 54, in Bremen on 13 May 2019 following a year-long battle with lymphoma.
