= Wulf Steinmann =

German physicist (1930–2019)

- Born: 12 July 1930; Essen, Germany
- Died: 3 January 2019 (aged 88)
- Occupation: Physicist

Wulf Steinmann (12 July 1930 – 3 January 2019) was a German physicist and former president of LMU Munich.
