= State Parliament (Germany) =

Unicameral legislatures of the German states

In the federal system of the Federal Republic of Germany, the state parliaments embody the legislative power in the sixteen states. In thirteen of the sixteen German states, the state parliament is known as the Landtag (an old German term that roughly means state parliament). In the states Free Hanseatic City of Bremen and Free and Hanseatic City of Hamburg, the state parliament is called Bürgerschaft (Citizenry), in Berlin it is called Abgeordnetenhaus (House of Representatives).

== Constitutional functions and powers ==
As the German constitution (Basic Law) defines the Federal Republic of Germany as a federation, the states retain a limited degree of sovereignty. The Basic Law gives the states a broad discretion to determine their respective state structure in their state constitutions, only stating that each German state has to be a social and democratic republic under the rule of law and that the people in every state must have an elected representation, without giving further details (Article 28.1). This provision only excludes a constitutional monarchy (as the states have to be republics) and otherwise theoretically allows for a wide range of democratic forms of government. In practice however, all states are parliamentary republics in which the legislative branch of government is assigned to an elected parliament and the executive branch of government is subject to parliamentary confidence, as is the case on federal level. Some details differ between the individual states, though. Since the abolition of the Bavarian Senate in 1999, which had previously been the upper house of a bicameral legislature, all sixteen state parliaments are unicameral.

Among the most important functions of the state parliaments are the election of the Minister-President (in some states also the cabinet ministers), the control of the state government and the adoption of state laws. With the exception of the Bavarian State Parliament, they also have the right to remove a sitting Minister-President from office by means of a vote of no confidence – in some states, however, this is only possible through a constructive vote of no confidence, in which a new Minister-President must be elected at the same time. In Bavaria, the State Parliament cannot formally remove the Minister-President; however, the State Constitution stipulates that a Minister-President must resign “if political circumstances make it impossible for him to work in a spirit of trust with the State Parliament” (Art. 44.3).

They have no influence on federal legislation, but indirectly participate in the election of the President of Germany by electing state delegates to the Federal Convention.

== Election process ==
Similar to federal elections, many states use a mixed-member proportional representation-system in which each voter casts one vote for a constituency candidate and a more significant second vote determines the proportional share of seats between the parties. However, this is not the case in all states, the exceptions being Bremen, where an open-list proportional representation system is used in one tier (the two cities that make up the state, Bremen city and Bremerhaven, serving as separate constituencies); Hamburg, where open-list proportional representation system is used in two tiers (3- to 5-member constituencies as well as leveling seats from a statewide list); Saarland, where voters have only one vote and a closed-list proportional representation system is used in two tiers (three constituencies and statewide leveling seats); and Bavaria, where there is a two-vote system, but both votes count towards the percentage composition of the parliament. In all states there is a 5%-threshold which must be exceeded for a party to be considered in the proportional distribution of seats, although in Bremen it is sufficient to exceed the threshold in only one of the two cities. The electoral systems of Berlin, Brandenburg, Saxony and Schleswig-Holstein also include a basic mandate clause which allows parties to be taken into account in the proportional distribution of seats regardless of the 5%-threshold if they win a certain number of constituencies (in Saxony two, in the other states one). As at the federal level, parties representing national minorities are excluded from both the 5%-threshold and the basic mandate clause. This provision is of particular importance in Schleswig-Holstein, where the SSW, a party which represents the minorities of Danes and Frisians, regularly participates in state elections.

Over the decades since the foundation of the Federal Republic, most states have adopted legislative sessions of five years, the only exception nowadays being Bremen, which still uses four-year-terms as is also still the case on federal level (a cross-party attempt to introduce five-year-terms in Bremen was defeated in a referendum in 2017).

An important difference to the Bundestag on federal level are the conditions for the dissolution of parliament and subsequent early new elections: While the Bundestag does not have the right of self-dissolution and can only be dissolved by the President of Germany (and even this only under certain conditions which are precisely defined in the Basic Law), all state parliaments have the right of self-dissolution (even if the procedure differs according to the state constitutions). In addition to this, some state constitutions also provide for an automatic dissolution of the parliament in certain parliamentary deadlock-situations and in some states, the parliament can also be dissolved by the people via a referendum.

Even though snap elections are thus easier to call in the states than at the federal level, they are still quite rare. In the 21st century (as of 2026), there have only been 9 snap elections in all 16 states combined:

- 2001 Berlin state election
- 2004 Hamburg state election
- 2009 Hesse state election
- 2009 Schleswig-Holstein state election
- 2011 Hamburg state election
- 2012 Saarland state election
- 2012 Schleswig-Holstein state election
- 2012 North Rhine-Westphalia state election
- 2017 Lower Saxony state election

By comparison, there have been two snap elections at the federal level alone during this period (2005 and 2025).

== Comparative table ==
State	Name	Election system	Threshold conditions	Seats	Session	Premature dissolution procedures
Baden-Württemberg	Landtag of Baden-Württemberg	mixed-member proportional representation with two votes	5% of second votes statewide	120+	5 years	self dissolution: motion must be tabled by at least one quarter and accepted by at least two-thirds of members referendum: request must be made by at least one sixth of the state population eligible to vote and must be accepted by a majority of the population eligible to vote
Free State of Bavaria	Landtag of Bavaria	mixed-member proportional representation with two votes (both votes counting towards proportional representation)	5% of votes statewide	180+	5 years	self dissolution: simple motion sufficient referendum: request must be made by at least one million citizens eligible to vote and must be accepted by a simple majority automatic dissolution: if the Landtag fails to elect a Minister-President within four weeks after a vacancy occurred
Berlin	House of Representatives of Berlin	mixed-member proportional representation with two votes	5% of second votes statewide or one constituency	130+	5 years	self dissolution: motion must be accepted by two-thirds of members referendum: state constitution does not specify details
Brandenburg	Landtag of Brandenburg	mixed-member proportional representation with two votes	5% of second votes statewide or one constituency	88+ (maximum of 110)	5 years	self dissolution: motion must be accepted by two-thirds of members; a simple majority is sufficient within 20 days after a lost motion of confidence by the Minister-president) dissolution by the Minister-president: if he or she has lost a motion of confidence and if the state parliament did not elect a new officeholder or dissolve itself within 20 days thereafter; he or she may only do so for 20 days (days 21 to 40 after the lost motion of confidence)
Free Hanseatic City of Bremen	Bürgerschaft of Bremen	Open-list proportional representation with cumulative voting and panachage (five votes) in two separate voting areas (Bremen City and Bremerhaven)	5% of votes in one of the two voting areas	87 (72 for Bremen City and 15 for Bremerhaven)	4 years	self dissolution: (motion must be tabled by at least one third and must be accepted by at least two-thirds of members referendum: request must be made by at least one fifth of the state population eligible to vote and must be accepted by a majority of the population eligible to vote
Free and Hanseatic City of Hamburg	Bürgerschaft of Hamburg	Open-list proportional representation with cumulative voting and panachage on state level and in multi member constituencies (10 votes: 5 for open state lists, 5 for open constituency lists)	5% of state list-votes	121+	5 years	self dissolution: motion must be tabled by at least one quarter and must be accepted by a majority of members
Hesse	Landtag of Hesse	mixed-member proportional representation with two votes	5% of second votes statewide	110+	5 years	self dissolution: motion must be accepted by a majority of members
Lower Saxony	Landtag of Lower Saxony	mixed-member proportional representation with two votes	5% of second votes statewide	135+	5 years	self dissolution: the state constitution defines two scenarios for a self dissolution: (A) one third of members may table a motion of self dissolution, which must be accepted by two-thirds of members present, who have to equal at least a majority of all members (Art. 10).; (B) Nonwithstanding variant A, the Landtag may dissolve itself with a majority of members, if it has failed to elect a Minister-President within 21 days after a vacancy occurred – alternatively it may elect a Minister-President with a plurality of votes (Art. 30)
Mecklenburg-Vorpommern	Landtag of Mecklenburg-Vorpommern	mixed-member proportional representation with two votes	5% of second votes statewide	71+	5 years	self dissolution: the state constitution defines two scenarios for a self dissolution: (A) one third of members may table a motion of self dissolution, which must be accepted by two-thirds of members (Art. 42.2).; (B) Nonwithstanding variant A, the Landtag may dissolve itself with a majority of members, if it has failed to elect a Minister-President within 28 days after a vacancy occurred – alternatively it may elect a Minister-President with a plurality of votes (Art. 30)
North Rhine-Westphalia	Landtag of North Rhine-Westphalia	mixed-member proportional representation with two votes	5% of second votes statewide	181+	5 years	self dissolution: motion must accepted by a majority of members
Rhineland-Palatinate	Landtag of Rhineland-Palatinate	mixed-member proportional representation with two votes	5% of second votes statewide	101+	5 years	self dissolution: simple motion automatic dissolution: if a motion of no confidence against the Minister-President has been successful and the Landtag fails to elect a new office-holder within four weeks
Saarland	Landtag of Saarland	Closed-list proportional representation with one vote, which counts both for a list in a multi member constituency and a state list	5% of votes statewide	51(+?) (Note: The electoral system of Saarland has a regulatory gap for the (unlikely but theoretically possible) case that a party is proportionally entitled to more seats in the multi member constituencies combined than would be the case on state level. The state's election law does not state whether this would lead to overhang or even compensation seats or whether the relevant party would lose its entitlement to the overhang mandates.)	5 years	self dissolution: motion must be accepted by two-thirds of members automatic dissolution: if a motion of no confidence against the Minister-President has been successful and the Landtag fails to elect a new office-holder within four weeks
Free State of Saxony	Landtag of Saxony	mixed-member proportional representation with two votes	5% of second votes statewide or two constituencies	120+	5 years	self dissolution: motion must be accepted by two-thirds of members automatic dissolution: if the Landtag fails to elect a Minister-President within four months after a vacancy occurred
Saxony-Anhalt	Landtag of Saxony-Anhalt	mixed-member proportional representation with two votes	5% of second votes statewide	83+	5 years	self dissolution: the state constitution defines two scenarios for a self dissolution: (A) one fourth of members may table a self dissolution motion, which has to be accepted by two-thirds of members. This is however not possible during the first six months of a legislative session (Art. 60).; (B) Nonwithstanding variant A, the Landtag may dissolve itself with a majority of members, if it has failed to elect a Minister-President on the first two ballots – alternatively it may elect a Minister-President with a plurality of votes on the third ballot (Art. 65.2)
Schleswig-Holstein	Landtag of Schleswig-Holstein	mixed-member proportional representation with two votes	5% of second votes statewide or one constituency	69+	5 years	self dissolution: motion must be accepted by at least two-thirds of members
Free State of Thuringia	Landtag of Thuringia	mixed-member proportional representation with two votes	5% of second votes statewide	88+	5 years	self dissolution: motion must be tabled by at least one third and must be accepted by at least two-thirds of members automatic dissolution: if the Minister-President has lost a confidence motion and the Landtag fails to elect a new Minister-President within 21 days

== List of state parliaments ==
	Plenary hall	Name	Legislative session	Composition	President	Last election	Next election
Baden-Württemberg		Landtag	18th	Graph of the party split among 157 seats.	Thomas Strobl; CDU since 12 May 2026	2026	2031
Baden-Württemberg		Landtag	18th	Government (112); Cabinet: Özdemir: Alliance 90/The Greens (56); CDU (56); Opposition (45): AfD (35); SPD (10)	Thomas Strobl; CDU since 12 May 2026	2026	2031
Free State of Bavaria		Landtag	19th	Graph of the party split among 203 seats.	Ilse Aigner; CSU since 5 November 2018	2023	2028
Free State of Bavaria		Landtag	19th	Government (122); Cabinet: Söder III: CSU (85); Free Voters (37); Opposition (81): AfD (32); Alliance 90/The Greens (32); SPD (17)	Ilse Aigner; CSU since 5 November 2018	2023	2028
Berlin		Abgeordnetenhaus	20th	Graph of the party split among 153 seats.	Hendrikje Klein; The Left since 29 October 2026	2026	2031
Berlin		Abgeordnetenhaus	20th	Caretaker-government (54); Senate: Wegner (Note: In accordance with the provisions of the state constitution, the government from the previous legislative session will continue to serve on a caretaker basis until the state parliament elects a new Governing Mayor.): CDU (33); SPD (21); Opposition (99): The Left (44); AfD (29); Alliance 90/The Greens (25); Non-inscrits (1)	Hendrikje Klein; The Left since 29 October 2026	2026	2031
Brandenburg		Landtag	8th	Graph of the party split among 88 seats.	Ulrike Liedtke; SPD since 25 September 2019	2024	2029
Brandenburg		Landtag	8th	Government (46); Cabinet: Woidke IV/V: SPD (34); CDU (12); Opposition (42): AfD (30); BSW (11); Non-inscrits (1)	Ulrike Liedtke; SPD since 25 September 2019	2024	2029
Free Hanseatic City of Bremen		Bürgerschaft	21st	Graph of the party split among 87 seats.	Antje Grotheer; SPD since 29 June 2023 (second term); 27 March 2019–3 July 2019 (first term)	2023	2027
Free Hanseatic City of Bremen		Bürgerschaft	21st	Government (47); Senate: Bovenschulte II: SPD (28); Alliance 90/The Greens (10); The Left (10); Opposition (40): CDU (24); Bündnis Deutschland (6); FDP (5); Bremen/Bremerhaven Citizens' Alliance (3) (Note: In the Bremen citizenry, at least five MPs are required to form a faction; accordingly, the Bremen/Bremerhaven Citizens' Alliance only has group status with limited parliamentary rights.); Non-inscrits (1)	Antje Grotheer; SPD since 29 June 2023 (second term); 27 March 2019–3 July 2019 (first term)	2023	2027
Free and Hanseatic City of Hamburg		Bürgerschaft	23rd	Graph of the party split among 121 seats.	Carola Veit; SPD since 23 March 2011	2025	2030
Free and Hanseatic City of Hamburg		Bürgerschaft	23rd	Government (70); Senate: Tschentscher III: SPD (45); Alliance 90/The Greens (25); Opposition (51): CDU (26); The Left (15); AfD (10)	Carola Veit; SPD since 23 March 2011	2025	2030
Hesse		Landtag	21st	Graph of the party split among 133 seats.	Astrid Wallmann since 31 May 2022	2023	2028
Hesse		Landtag	21st	Government (75); Cabinet: Rhein II: CDU (52); SPD (23); Opposition (58): AfD (25); Alliance 90/The Greens (22); FDP (8); Non-inscrits (3)	Astrid Wallmann since 31 May 2022	2023	2028
Lower Saxony		Landtag	19th	Graph of the party split among 146 seats.	Hanna Naber; SPD since 8 November 2022	2022	2027
Lower Saxony		Landtag	19th	Government (81); Cabinet: Lies: SPD (57); Alliance 90/The Greens (24); Opposition (65): CDU (47); AfD (17); Non-inscrits (1)	Hanna Naber; SPD since 8 November 2022	2022	2027
Mecklenburg-Vorpommern		Landtag	9th	Graph of the party split among 71 seats.	Birgit Hesse; SPD since 22 May 2019	2026	2031
Mecklenburg-Vorpommern		Landtag	9th	Government (39); Cabinet: Schwesig III: SPD (29); The Left (5); Alliance 90/The Greens (5); Opposition (32): AfD (32)	Birgit Hesse; SPD since 22 May 2019	2026	2031
North Rhine-Westphalia		Landtag	18th	Graph of the party split among 195 seats.	André Kuper; CDU since 1 June 2017	2022	2027
North Rhine-Westphalia		Landtag	18th	Government (115); Cabinet: Wüst II: CDU (76); Alliance 90/The Greens (39); Opposition (80): SPD (56); FDP (12); AfD (12)	André Kuper; CDU since 1 June 2017	2022	2027
Rhineland-Palatinate		Landtag	19th	Graph of the party split among 105 seats.	Matthias Lammert; CDU since 18 May 2026	2026	2031
Rhineland-Palatinate		Landtag	19th	Government (71); Cabinet: Schnieder: CDU (39); SPD (32); Opposition (34): AfD (24); Alliance 90/The Greens (10)	Matthias Lammert; CDU since 18 May 2026	2026	2031
Saarland		Landtag	17th	Graph of the party split among 51 seats.	Heike Becker; SPD since 25 April 2022	2022	2027
Saarland		Landtag	17th	Government (29); Cabinet: Rehlinger: SPD (29); Opposition (22): CDU (19); AfD (3)	Heike Becker; SPD since 25 April 2022	2022	2027
Free State of Saxony		Landtag	8th	Graph of the party split among 120 seats.	Alexander Dierks; CDU since 01 October 2024	2024	2029
Free State of Saxony		Landtag	8th	Government (51); Cabinet: Kretschmer III: CDU (41); SPD (10); Opposition (69): AfD (40); BSW (14); Alliance 90/The Greens (7); The Left (6); Non-inscrits (2)	Alexander Dierks; CDU since 01 October 2024	2024	2029
Saxony-Anhalt		Landtag	9th	Graph of the party split among 83 seats.	Tobias Rausch; AfD since 06 October 2026	2026	2031
Saxony-Anhalt		Landtag	9th	Caretaker-government (23); Cabinet: Schulze (Note: In accordance with the provisions of the state constitution, the government from the previous legislative session will continue to serve on a caretaker basis until the state parliament elects a new Minister-President. During the previous legislative session, the Schulze cabinet was also supported by the FDP, which is no longer represented in the new state parliament.): CDU (15); SPD (8); Opposition (60): AfD (39); The Left (8); Alliance 90/The Greens (8); BSW (5)	Tobias Rausch; AfD since 06 October 2026	2026	2031
Schleswig-Holstein		Landtag	20th	Graph of the party split among 69 seats.	Kristina Herbst; CDU since 07 May 2022	2022	2027
Schleswig-Holstein		Landtag	20th	Government (48); Cabinet: Günther II: CDU (34); Alliance 90/The Greens (14); Opposition (21): SPD (12); FDP (5); SSW (4)	Kristina Herbst; CDU since 07 May 2022	2022	2027
Free State of Thuringia		Landtag	8th	Graph of the party split among 88 seats.	Thadäus König; CDU since 28 September 2024	2024	2029
Free State of Thuringia		Landtag	8th	Government (39); Cabinet: Voigt: CDU (23); Thüringen.Gerecht (10); SPD (6); Opposition (49): AfD (32); The Left (12); Non-inscrits (5)	Thadäus König; CDU since 28 September 2024	2024	2029
