= Bremen II – Bremerhaven =

Federal electoral district of Germany

55 Bremen II – Bremerhaven
- Electoral district for the Bundestag
- Bremen II – Bremerhaven in 2025
- State: Bremen
- Population: 324,300 (2019)
- Electorate: 214,365 (2021)
- Major settlements: Bremen (partial); Bremerhaven
- Area: 265.0 km^{2}

Current electoral district
- Created: 1949
- Party: SPD
- Member: Uwe Schmidt
- Elected: 2017, 2021, 2025

Bremen II – Bremerhaven is an electoral constituency (German: Wahlkreis) represented in the Bundestag. It elects one member via first-past-the-post voting. Under the current constituency numbering system, it is designated as constituency 55. It is located in the state of Bremen, comprising western and northern parts of the city of Bremen and the exclave of Bremerhaven.

Bremen II – Bremerhaven was created for the inaugural 1949 federal election. Since 2017, it has been represented by Uwe Schmidt of the Social Democratic Party (SPD).

== Geography ==
Bremen II – Bremerhaven is located in the state of Bremen. As of the 2021 federal election, it comprises the city of Bremerhaven, as well as from the city of Bremen the boroughs of West and Nord, the Stadtteil of Häfen from the borough of Mitte, and the Stadtteile of Woltmershausen and Ortsteile of Seehausen and Strom from the borough of Süd.

== History ==
Bremen II – Bremerhaven was created in 1949, then known as Bremerhaven – Bremen-Nord. It acquired its current name in the 2002 election. In the inaugural Bundestag election, it was Bremen constituency 3 in the numbering system. From 1953 through 1961, it was number 59. From 1965 through 1998, it was number 52. In the 2002 and 2005 elections, it was number 55. In the 2009 election, it was number 56. Since the 2013 election, it has been number 55.

Originally, the constituency comprised the borough of Nord and the city of Bremerhaven. It acquired its current borders in the 2002 election.

Election	No.	Name	Borders
1949	3	Bremerhaven – Bremen-Nord	Nord borough; Bremerhaven
1953	59	Bremerhaven – Bremen-Nord	Nord borough; Bremerhaven
1957	59	Bremerhaven – Bremen-Nord	Nord borough; Bremerhaven
1961	59	Bremerhaven – Bremen-Nord	Nord borough; Bremerhaven
1965	52	Bremerhaven – Bremen-Nord	Nord borough; Bremerhaven
1969	52	Bremerhaven – Bremen-Nord	Nord borough; Bremerhaven
1972	52	Bremerhaven – Bremen-Nord	Nord borough; Bremerhaven
1976	52	Bremerhaven – Bremen-Nord	Nord borough; Bremerhaven
1980	52	Bremerhaven – Bremen-Nord	Nord borough; Bremerhaven
1983	52	Bremerhaven – Bremen-Nord	Nord borough; Bremerhaven
1987	52	Bremerhaven – Bremen-Nord	Nord borough; Bremerhaven
1990	52	Bremerhaven – Bremen-Nord	Nord borough; Bremerhaven
1994	52	Bremerhaven – Bremen-Nord	Nord borough; Bremerhaven
1998	52	Bremerhaven – Bremen-Nord	Nord borough; Bremerhaven
2002	55	Bremen II – Bremerhaven	West borough; Nord borough; Mitte borough (only Häfen Stadtteil); Süd borough (only Woltmershausen Stadtteil and Seehausen and Strom Ortsteile); Bremerhaven
2005	55	Bremen II – Bremerhaven	West borough; Nord borough; Mitte borough (only Häfen Stadtteil); Süd borough (only Woltmershausen Stadtteil and Seehausen and Strom Ortsteile); Bremerhaven
2009	56	Bremen II – Bremerhaven	West borough; Nord borough; Mitte borough (only Häfen Stadtteil); Süd borough (only Woltmershausen Stadtteil and Seehausen and Strom Ortsteile); Bremerhaven
2013	55	Bremen II – Bremerhaven	West borough; Nord borough; Mitte borough (only Häfen Stadtteil); Süd borough (only Woltmershausen Stadtteil and Seehausen and Strom Ortsteile); Bremerhaven
2017	55	Bremen II – Bremerhaven	West borough; Nord borough; Mitte borough (only Häfen Stadtteil); Süd borough (only Woltmershausen Stadtteil and Seehausen and Strom Ortsteile); Bremerhaven
2021	55	Bremen II – Bremerhaven	West borough; Nord borough; Mitte borough (only Häfen Stadtteil); Süd borough (only Woltmershausen Stadtteil and Seehausen and Strom Ortsteile); Bremerhaven
2025	55	Bremen II – Bremerhaven	West borough; Nord borough; Mitte borough (only Häfen Stadtteil); Süd borough (only Woltmershausen Stadtteil and Seehausen and Strom Ortsteile); Bremerhaven

== Members ==
The constituency has been held continuously by the Social Democratic Party (SPD) since its creation. Its first representative was Bernhard Lohmüller, who served from 1949 until his death in 1952. He was succeeded by Philipp Wehr after a by-election. Wehr was subsequently re-elected in the 1953 and 1957 elections. Werner Lenz became representative in the 1961 election and served a single term. Harry Tallert then served from 1965 to 1972. Horst Grunenberg served five terms between 1972 and 1990. He was succeeded by Ilse Janz, who served until 2002. Uwe Beckmeyer was representative from 2002 to 2017. Uwe Schmidt has served since the 2017 election.

Election	Member	Party	%
1949	Bernhard Lohmüller	SPD	37.3
1952	Philipp Wehr	SPD	51.3
1953	Philipp Wehr	SPD	39.2
1957	Philipp Wehr	SPD	46.5
1961	Werner Lenz	SPD	50.6
1965	Harry Tallert	SPD	51.3
1969	Harry Tallert	SPD	54.3
1972	Horst Grunenberg	SPD	62.6
1976	Horst Grunenberg	SPD	56.3
1980	Horst Grunenberg	SPD	56.3
1983	Horst Grunenberg	SPD	53.6
1987	Horst Grunenberg	SPD	50.4
1990	Ilse Janz	SPD	46.3
1994	Ilse Janz	SPD	50.2
1998	Ilse Janz	SPD	58.2
2002	Uwe Beckmeyer	SPD	56.3
2005	Uwe Beckmeyer	SPD	58.0
2009	Uwe Beckmeyer	SPD	38.7
2013	Uwe Beckmeyer	SPD	44.0
2017	Uwe Schmidt	SPD	34.1
2021	Uwe Schmidt	SPD	36.9
2025	Uwe Schmidt	SPD	30.3

== Election results ==
=== 2025 election ===
Federal election (2025): Bremen II – Bremerhaven
Notes:	Blue background denotes the winner of the electorate vote. Pink background denotes a candidate elected from their party list. Yellow background denotes an electorate win by a list member, or other incumbent. A ✓ or ✗ denotes status of any incumbent, win or lose respectively.						
Party	Candidate	Votes	%	±%	Party votes	%	±%
SPD	✓ Uwe Schmidt	46,600	30.3	▼6.7	38,145	24.7	▼10.2
CDU	Sandra Schmull	32,356	21.0	▲0.9	30,371	19.7	▲2.8
AfD	Arno Staschewski	29,888	19.4	▲10.6	29,702	19.2	▲10.3
Left	Dariush Khorashad	18,588	12.1	▲4.6	20,627	13.4	▲6.6
Greens	Michael Labetzke	16,716	10.9	▼3.8	18,466	12.0	▼4.9
BSW					7,104	4.6	New
FDP	Tiara Behrmann	4,069	2.6	▼3.3	4,877	3.2	▼5.3
Volt	Matthias Cornelsen	2,339	1.5	New	1,636	1.1	▲0.7
PARTEI					1,241	0.8	▼0.5
FW	Katharina Büntjen	1,758	1.1	▼0.1	1,031	0.7	▼0.3
BD	Christopher Albrecht	1,167	0.8	New	490	0.3	New
MW					389	0.3	▲0.1
Verjüngungsforschung					156	0.1	New
MLPD	Lena Salomon	454	0.3	▲0.2	125	0.1	0.0
MERA25					99	0.1	New
Informal votes		1,661			1,137		
Total valid votes		153,935			154,459		
Turnout		155,596	73.9	▲6.6			
SPD hold	Majority	14,244	9.3	▼7.5			

=== 2021 election ===
Federal election (2021): Bremen II – Bremerhaven
Notes:	Blue background denotes the winner of the electorate vote. Pink background denotes a candidate elected from their party list. Yellow background denotes an electorate win by a list member, or other incumbent. A ✓ or ✗ denotes status of any incumbent, win or lose respectively.						
Party	Candidate	Votes	%	±%	Party votes	%	±%
SPD	✓ Uwe Schmidt	52,498	36.9	▲3.0	49,799	34.9	▲5.3
CDU	Wiebke Winter	28,552	20.1	▼4.9	24,124	16.9	▼7.1
Greens	Michael Labetzke	20,769	14.6	▲6.9	24,013	16.8	▲7.8
AfD	Thomas Jürgewitz	12,466	8.8	▼2.7	12,740	8.9	▼3.2
Left	Doris Achelwilm	10,617	7.5	▼4.0	9,613	6.7	▼5.7
FDP	Gökhan Akkamis	8,469	6.0	▼0.7	12,085	8.5	▲0.3
Tierschutzpartei					2,372	1.7	
PARTEI	Ralf Fasmers	2,629	1.9	▼0.2	1,932	1.4	▼0.3
Team Todenhöfer					1,559	1.1	
FW	Katharina Büntjen	1,799	1.3	▲0.6	1,438	1.0	▲0.5
dieBasis	Annette Kaufmann	1,770	1.2		1,453	1.0	
Piraten	Christian Daum	908	0.6				
Volt					479	0.3	
V-Partei3	Rolf Bode	609	0.4		269	0.2	▼0.1
Humanists	Mathis Härtel	490	0.3		264	0.2	
Menschliche Welt					205	0.1	▼0.2
ÖDP	Kara Tober	391	0.3		195	0.1	
NPD					187	0.1	▼0.3
MLPD	Jürgen Bader	119	0.1	0.0	76	0.1	0.0
Informal votes		2,037			1,320		
Total valid votes		142,086			142,803		
Turnout		144,123	67.2	▲0.5			
SPD hold	Majority	23,946	16.8	▲7.9			

=== 2017 election ===
Federal election (2017): Bremen II – Bremerhaven
Notes:	Blue background denotes the winner of the electorate vote. Pink background denotes a candidate elected from their party list. Yellow background denotes an electorate win by a list member, or other incumbent. A ✓ or ✗ denotes status of any incumbent, win or lose respectively.						
Party	Candidate	Votes	%	±%	Party votes	%	±%
SPD	Uwe Schmidt	49,463	34.0	▼9.9	43,215	29.6	▼9.0
CDU	Bettina Hornhues	36,363	25.0	▼3.8	34,951	23.9	▼4.1
Left	Nelson Janßen	16,739	11.5	▲2.4	18,204	12.5	▲2.4
AfD	Frank Magnitz	16,645	11.4	▲7.7	17,705	12.1	▲8.0
Greens	Maurice Müller	11,269	7.7	▼0.7	13,165	9.0	▼0.9
FDP	Hauke Hilz	9,755	6.7	▲5.2	11,918	8.2	▲5.4
PARTEI	Ralf Balke	3,009	2.1		2,418	1.7	▲1.3
Pirates					951	0.7	▼1.9
FW	Katharina Büntjen	939	0.6		706	0.5	▲0.2
MENSCHLICHE WELT	Achim Langer	787	0.5		513	0.4	
BGE					680	0.5	
NPD					487	0.3	▼1.3
V-Partei³					430	0.3	
DM					293	0.2	
MLPD	Joachim Niegisch	150	0.1		119	0.1	0.0
DKP					80	0.1	
Informal votes		2,249			1,908		
Total valid votes		145,606			145,947		
Turnout		147,855	66.7	▲1.4			
SPD hold	Majority	13,100	9.0	▼6.2			

=== 2013 election ===
Federal election (2013): Bremen II – Bremerhaven
Notes:	Blue background denotes the winner of the electorate vote. Pink background denotes a candidate elected from their party list. Yellow background denotes an electorate win by a list member, or other incumbent. A ✓ or ✗ denotes status of any incumbent, win or lose respectively.						
Party	Candidate	Votes	%	±%	Party votes	%	±%
SPD	✓ Uwe Beckmeyer	64,276	43.9	▲5.2	56,702	38.6	▲5.8
CDU	Bettina Hornhues	42,067	28.7	▲3.0	41,205	28.1	▲5.3
Left	Kristina Vogt	13,335	9.1	▼5.1	14,782	10.1	▼5.3
Greens	Sülmez Dogan	12,325	8.4	▼2.7	14,566	9.9	▼3.0
AfD	Erich Seifert	5,428	3.7		6,044	4.1	
Pirates	Caroline Bullwinkel	3,982	2.7		3,699	2.5	▲0.2
NPD	Horst Görmann	2,393	1.6	▼0.1	2,240	1.5	▲0.2
FDP	Hauke Hilz	2,189	1.5	▼5.6	4,036	2.8	▼7.0
Tierschutzpartei					1,824	1.2	
PARTEI					590	0.4	
Bündnis 21/RRP		432	0.3	▼0.7	276	0.2	▼1.5
FW					416	0.3	
PRO					267	0.2	
MLPD					69	0.0	0.0
Informal votes		2,083			1,794		
Total valid votes		146,427			146,716		
Turnout		148,510	65.3	▼1.4			
SPD hold	Majority	22,209	15.2	▲2.3			

=== 2009 election ===
Federal election (2009): Bremen II – Bremerhaven
Notes:	Blue background denotes the winner of the electorate vote. Pink background denotes a candidate elected from their party list. Yellow background denotes an electorate win by a list member, or other incumbent. A ✓ or ✗ denotes status of any incumbent, win or lose respectively.						
Party	Candidate	Votes	%	±%	Party votes	%	±%
SPD	✓ Uwe Beckmeyer	58,879	38.7	▼15.7	50,032	32.8	▼13.9
CDU	Bernd Neumann	39,186	25.8	▲1.0	34,680	22.7	▲1.2
Left	Inga Nitz	21,647	14.2	▲6.5	23,486	15.4	▲6.6
Greens	Klaus Möhle	16,985	11.2	▲4.2	19,727	12.9	▲1.4
FDP	Oliver Möllenstädt	10,850	7.1	▲3.4	14,947	9.8	▲2.6
Pirates					3,610	2.4	
NPD	Horst Görmann	2,614	1.7	▼0.3	2,045	1.3	▼0.6
RRP	Uwe Gäthje	1,563	1.0		2,527	1.7	
DVU					657	0.4	
Independent	Martin Tangeten	423	0.3				
PBC					397	0.3	0.0
REP					330	0.2	
MLPD					83	0.1	0.0
Informal votes		2,691			2,317		
Total valid votes		152,147			152,521		
Turnout		154,838	66.8	▼6.3			
SPD hold	Majority	16,693	12.9	▼16.7			

=== 2005 election ===
Federal election (2005):Bremen II – Bremerhaven
Notes:	Blue background denotes the winner of the electorate vote. Pink background denotes a candidate elected from their party list. Yellow background denotes an electorate win by a list member, or other incumbent. A ✓ or ✗ denotes status of any incumbent, win or lose respectively.						
Party	Candidate	Votes	%	±%	Party votes	%	±%
SPD	✓ Uwe Beckmeyer	91,154	54.4	▼3.7	78,327	46.7	▼6.0
CDU	Bernd Ravens	41,582	24.8	▲0.5	36,166	21.5	▼1.9
Left	Günter Matthiessen	12,957	7.7	▲6.0	14,753	8.8	▲6.8
Greens	Klaus-Dieter Möhle	11,702	7.0	▼0.5	19,402	11.6	▼0.5
FDP	Oliver Möllenstädt	6,316	3.8	▲1.0	12,143	7.2	▲1.0
NPD	Horst Görmann	3,310	2.0	▲1.3	3,256	1.9	▲1.3
GRAUEN					2,043	1.2	▲0.6
Feminist					791	0.5	
Independent	Hans-Albert Köppen	681	0.4				
PBC					469	0.3	
Pro Deutsche Mitte – Initiative Pro D-Mark					375	0.2	
MLPD					115	0.1	
Informal votes		3,033			2,895		
Total valid votes		167,702			167,840		
Turnout		170,735	73.1	▼3.5			
SPD hold	Majority	49,572	29.6				
