= Uwe Schmidt (politician) =

German politician

Uwe Schmidt MdB
- Schmidt in 2021

Member of the Bundestag; for Bremen II – Bremerhaven
- Incumbent
- Assumed office 24 October 2017
- Preceded by: Uwe Beckmeyer

Member of the Bürgerschaft of Bremen; for Bremerhaven
- In office 8 June 2015 – 31 October 2017
- Preceded by: Multi-member district
- Succeeded by: Frank Schildt

Personal details
- Born: 14 February 1966 (age 60) Bremerhaven, West Germany
- Party: Social Democratic
- Children: 1

Uwe Schmidt (born 14 February 1966) is a German stevedore and politician of the Social Democratic Party (SPD) who has been serving as a member of the Bundestag from the state of Bremen since 2017.

== Political career ==
From 2015 until 2017, Schmidt served as a member of the State Parliament of Bremen.

Schmidt became a member of the Bundestag in the 2017 German federal election. In parliament, he is a member of the Committee for Food and Agriculture and the Committee on Transport and Digital Infrastructure.

Since 2022, Schmidt has been leading the Bundestag group of SPD parliamentarians from Northern Germany.
