= Uwe Beckmeyer =

German politician

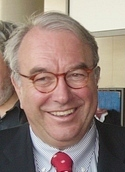
- Beckmeyer in 2009

Member of the Bundestag; for Bremen II – Bremerhaven
- In office 17 October 2002 – 24 October 2017
- Preceded by: Ilse Janz
- Succeeded by: Uwe Schmidt

Senator for Labour of Bremen
- In office 4 July 1995 – 7 July 1999
- President: Henning Scherf
- Preceded by: Sabine Uhl
- Succeeded by: Hilde Adolf

Senator for Ports, Supra-regional Transport and Foreign Trade of Bremen (Note: Senator for Ports, Shipping and Foreign Trade of Bremen (1991–1995))
- In office 11 December 1991 – 7 July 1999
- President: Klaus Wedemeier; Henning Scherf
- Preceded by: Konrad Kunick
- Succeeded by: Josef Hattig

Senator for Economics Affairs, Technology and Foreign Trade of Bremen
- In office 15 October 1987 – 11 December 1991
- President: Klaus Wedemeier
- Preceded by: Werner Lenz
- Succeeded by: Claus Jäger

Member of the Bürgerschaft of Bremen; for Bremerhaven
- In office 7 July 1999 – 15 October 2002
- Preceded by: Multi-member district
- Succeeded by: Elisabeth Grunenberg
- In office October 1975 – 13 October 1987
- Preceded by: Multi-member district
- Succeeded by: Günter Linde

Personal details
- Born: Uwe Karl Beckmeyer; 26 March 1949 (age 77) Bremerhaven, Germany
- Party: Social Democratic
- Children: 1

Uwe Karl Beckmeyer (born 26 March 1949) is a German politician of the Social Democratic Party of Germany (SPD) who served as a member of the German Bundestag from 2002 until 2017.

From October 2004, he served as the SPD parliamentary group's speaker on traffic, construction and urban development. From 1987 to 1991 he served as State Minister (Senator) for Economic Affairs and from 1991 to 1999 senator for foreign trade of Bremen. Since 2006, he has served as regional chairman of the SPD in Bremen.

== Early life and education ==
After the Abitur in 1968 at a high school of economics, Beckmeyer completed a study for the teaching profession at grammar schools, which he concluded with two state examinations. Until 1975, he worked as a teacher in Bremerhaven.

== Political career ==
Beckmeyer has been a member of the SPD since 1969 and was chairman of the SPD district of Bremerhaven from 1972 to 1987. On 25 March 2006, he was elected as regional chairman of the SPD in the state of Bremen.

From 1975 to 1987, as well as from 1999 to 2002, Beckmeyer was a member of the parliament of Bremen. There, he was deputy chairman of the SPD faction from 1979 to 1987.

From 2002 until 2017, Beckmeyer was a member of the German federal parliament, where he holds the office of speaker of the task group for traffic, construction and town development of the SPD's faction since 2004. In December 2005, he also became a member of the parliamentary group's executive committee.

Beckmeyer always entered the federal parliament as a directly elected candidate for the Bremen II – Bremerhaven constituency. At the 2005 German federal election he won 54.4% of first votes.

On 15 October 1987, Beckmeyer was appointed as a senator for economics, technology and foreign trade into the senate of the free Hanseatic city Bremen, led by president of the senate Klaus Wedemeier. After the 1991 parliamentary elections in Bremen, he became senator for ports, navigation and foreign trade on 11 December 1991, and also senator for federal matters.

With the assumption of office of Henning Scherf as new mayor and president of the senate Beckmeyer on 4 July 1995, Beckmeyer was elected as senator for ports, supraregional traffic and foreign trade as well as senator for employment. After the elections to the Bremen parliament of 1999, he abandoned his public positions on 7 July 1999.

== Other activities ==
- Grontmij, Member of the Council (2009–2013)
- Deutsche Flugsicherung (DFS), Member of the Advisory Board (2006–2013)
- Federal Network Agency for Electricity, Gas, Telecommunications, Post and Railway (BNetzA), Member of the Rail Infrastructure Advisory Council (2006–2011)
- Karl Könecke GmbH & Co. KG Fleischwarenfabrik, Member of the Advisory Board (until 2005)

== Personal life ==
Uwe Beckmeyer is married and has a son.
