= Christine Schnittker =

German politician (born 1974)

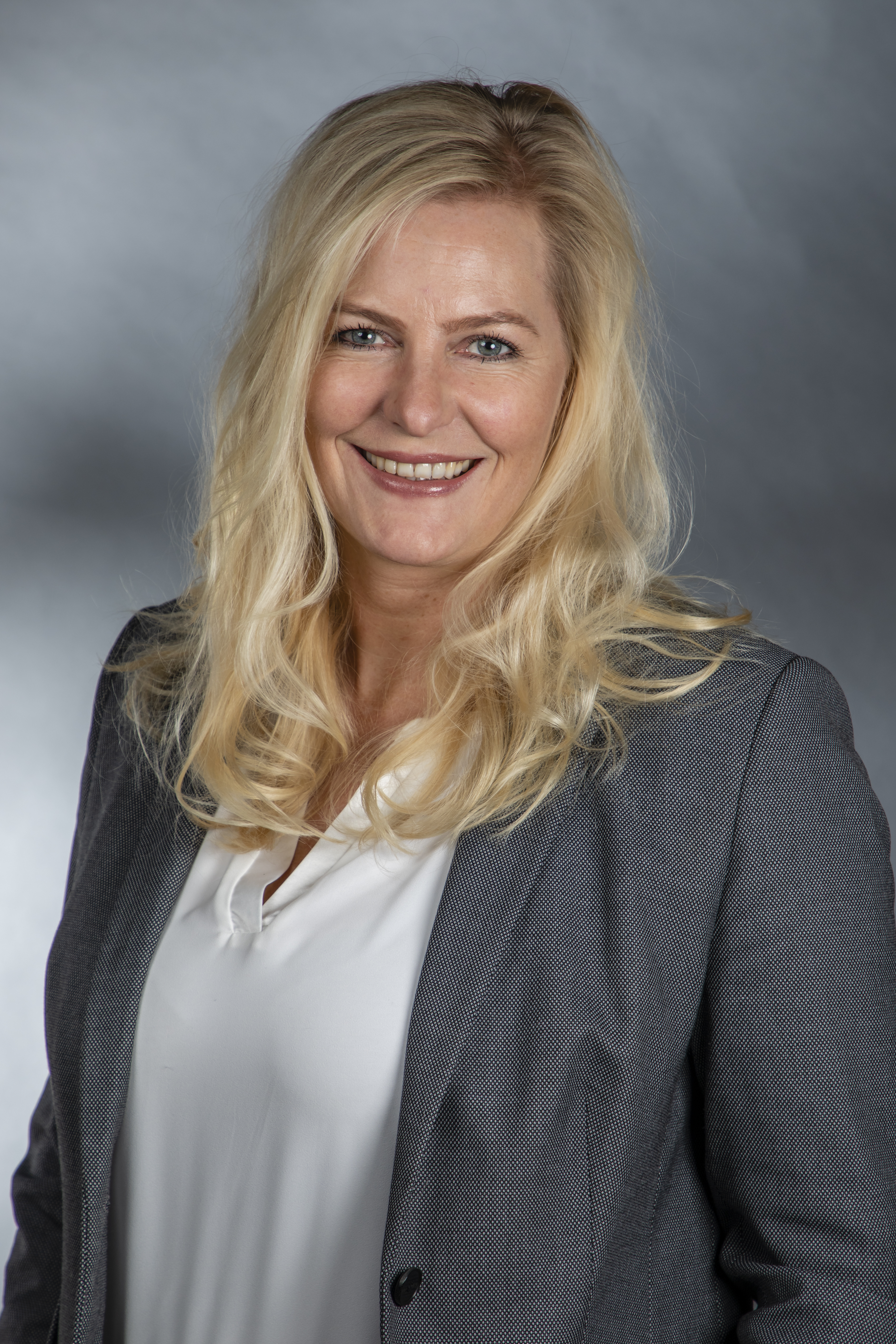
- Schnittker in 2019

Member of the Bürgerschaft of Bremen
- Incumbent
- Assumed office 8 June 2015

Personal details
- Born: 8 June 1974 (age 51) Bremerhaven
- Party: Christian Democratic Union (since 2008)

Christine Schnittker (born 8 June 1974 in Bremerhaven) is a German politician serving as a member of the Bürgerschaft of Bremen since 2015. She has served as vice president of the Bürgerschaft since 2023.
