= Maurice Müller =

Maurice Müller may refer to:

- Maurice Müller (footballer) (born 1992), German footballer
- Maurice Müller (politician) (born 1983), German politician
- Maurice Edmond Müller (1918–2009), Swiss orthopedic surgeon
