= Lichtenberg 5 =

State electoral district of Germany

- Electoral district for the Berlin House of Representatives
- Lichtenberg 5 in 2026
- District: Lichtenberg
- Electorate: 32,853 (2026)

Current electoral district
- Party: The Left
- Member: Hendrikje Klein

Lichtenberg 5 is an electoral constituency (German: Wahlkreis) represented in the House of Representatives of Berlin. It elects one member via first-past-the-post voting.

== Geography ==
The constituency comprises the districts of Friedrichsfelde and Tierpark, as well as the Weitlingkiez neighbourhood in the Rummelsburg district. It is entirely within the borough of Lichtenberg.

There were 32,853 eligible voters in 2026.

== Members ==
Election	Member	Party	%
2006	Giyasettin Sayan	The Left	34.8
2011	Ole Kreins	SPD	34.1
2016	Hendrikje Klein	The Left	29.6
2021	Hendrikje Klein	The Left	26.3
2023	Hendrikje Klein	The Left	25.0
2026	Hendrikje Klein	The Left	39.3

== Election results ==
=== 2026 election ===
State election (2026): Lichtenberg 5
Notes:	Blue background denotes the winner of the electorate vote. Pink background denotes a candidate elected from their party list. Yellow background denotes an electorate win by a list member, or other incumbent. A ✓ or ✗ denotes status of any incumbent, win or lose respectively.						
Party	Candidate	Votes	%	±%	Party votes	%	±%
Left	✓ Hendrikje Klein	9,158	39.3	▲14.4	8,009	34.1	▲13.1
AfD	Matthias Ebert	5,017	21.5	▲8.4	4,926	21.0	▲8.2
CDU	Sarah Ribbeck	2,598	11.2	▼8.6	2,476	10.5	▼9.3
Greens	Stefan Taschner	1,989	8.5	▼5.6	2,316	9.8	▼5.1
SPD	Marlon Bünck	1,947	8.4	▼7.9	2,081	8.9	▼7.0
BSW	Torsten Holze	1,459	6.3		1,555	6.6	
APT					712	3.0	▼0.6
Volt	Nicolas Künzel	700	3.0		554	2.4	▲1.3
FDP	Nora Zapf	426	1.8	▼0.9	412	1.8	▼1.2
PARTEI					226	1.0	▼1.3
PdF					96	0.4	
HEIMAT					42	0.2	Steady
ÖDP					37	0.2	▲0.1
DKP					36	0.2	▼0.2
du.					19	0.1	▼0.3
SGP					16	0.1	Steady
Informal votes		578			359		
Total valid votes		23,294			23,513		
Turnout		23,872	72.7	▲12.4			
Left hold	Majority	4,141	17.8	▲12.6			

=== 2023 repeat election ===
Changes denoted below for the 2023 election are compared to the 2016 election, as the 2021 election was declared invalid.

State election (2023): Lichtenberg 5
Notes:	Blue background denotes the winner of the electorate vote. Pink background denotes a candidate elected from their party list. Yellow background denotes an electorate win by a list member, or other incumbent. A ✓ or ✗ denotes status of any incumbent, win or lose respectively.						
Party	Candidate	Votes	%	±%	Party votes	%	±%
Left	✓ Hendrikje Klein	4,928	25.0	▼4.6	4,139	20.9	▼5.5
CDU	Sarah Röhr	3,900	19.8	▲9.4	3,919	19.8	10.2
SPD	Patricia Holland-Moritz	3,203	16.2	▼6.5	3,140	15.9	▼3.8
Greens	Stefan Taschner	2,791	14.1	▲2.5	2,959	15.0	▲3.3
AfD	Uwe Dinda	2,588	13.1	▼3.9	2,518	12.7	▼3.5
APT	Jennifer Witte	872	4.4		725	3.7	▲1.0
PARTEI	Nicole Rakow	549	2.8		437	2.2	▼1.3
FDP	Dirk Gawlitza	545	2.8	▲0.2	582	2.9	▲0.2
Volt					206	1.0	
Pirates					115	0.6	▼1.8
The Grays					105	0.5	
Gray Panthers					104	0.5	▼0.7
FW	Torsten Holze	221	1.1		102	0.5	
dieBasis	Volker Schmidt	130	0.7		97	0.5	
Mieterpartei					85	0.4	
Verjüngungsforschung					81	0.4	▼0.3
du.					70	0.4	
DKP					64	0.3	Steady
Klimaliste					63	0.3	
Team Todenhöfer					42	0.2	
Bildet Berlin!					36	0.2	
NPD					36	0.2	▼0.8
Humanists					36	0.2	
Bergpartei, die ÜberPartei					23	0.1	
ÖDP					20	0.1	
The Pinks/Alliance 21					20	0.1	
SGP					18	0.1	▼0.2
BüSo					12	0.1	▼0.1
LKR	Carolyn England	17	0.1		9	0.0	▼0.4
Informal votes		205			193		
Total valid votes		19,744			19,763		
Turnout		19,972	60.3	▼2.5			
Left hold	Majority	1,028	5.2				

== See also ==
- Politics of Berlin
- House of Representatives of Berlin
