= Stephan Toscani =

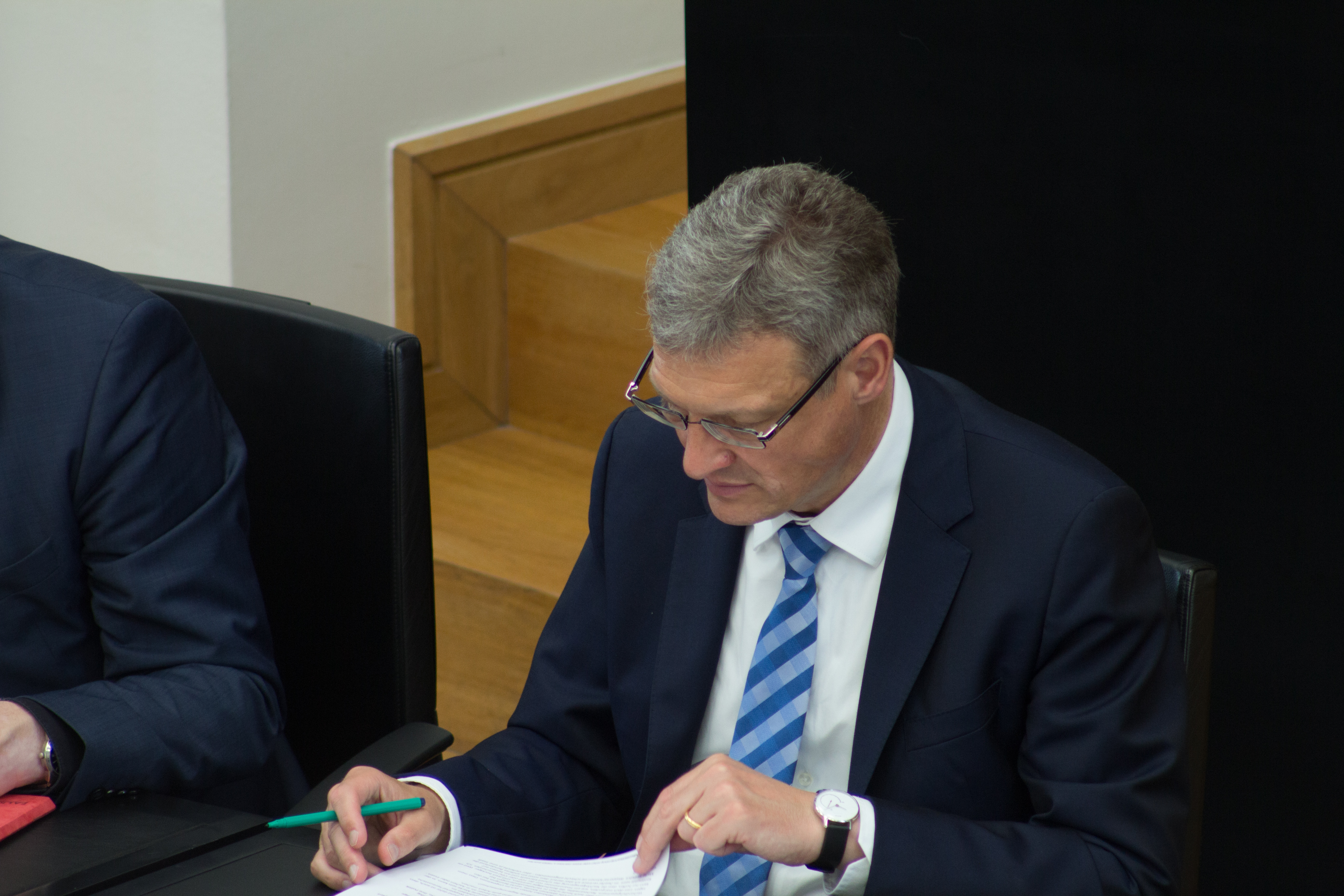
- Toscani in 2017

President of the Landtag of Saarland
- In office 2018 – 25 April 2022
- Preceded by: Klaus Meiser
- Succeeded by: Heike Winzent

Personal details
- Born: 21 February 1967 (age 59) Saarbrücken
- Party: Christian Democratic Union of Germany
- Education: Saarland University

Stephan Toscani (born 21 February 1967 in Saarbrücken) is a German politician from the Christian Democratic Union of Germany (CDU). He has been a member of the Landtag of Saarland since 1999. Since May 2022, he has been the state chairman of the CDU Saar and the parliamentary group leader of his party, thus also serving as the opposition leader in the state parliament.

Previously, he served as State Minister in various ministries of Saarland from 2009 to 2018 and subsequently as President of the Saarland State Parliament until 2022.

== Life ==
Toscani graduated from the Von der Leyen-Gymnasium in Blieskastel in 1986. After studying law at Saarland University, he completed his legal traineeship from 1992 to 1995, passing the Assessor examination. From 1996 to 1999, Toscani served as a government councilor in the Federal Ministry of Education and Research in Bonn.

Stephan Toscani is married and has two children.

== Political career ==
Toscani was state chairman of the Junge Union Saar from 1993 to 1999. From 2001 to 2017 he was chairman of the Saarpfalz CDU district association and from 2003 to November 2009 general secretary of the CDU Saar. From May 2011 he was deputy chairman of the Saarland CDU, initially under Annegret Kramp-Karrenbauer, and from March 2018 under Tobias Hans. On 28 May 2022, Toscani was elected chairman of the CDU Saar.

Since September 1999, Toscani has been a member of the Landtag of Saarland (12th, 13th, 14th, 15th, and 16th electoral terms). From 2000 to November 2009, he served as parliamentary manager of the CDU parliamentary group in the Landtag of Saarland. From March 2018 to April 2022, he served as President of the Landtag of Saarland.

From November 2009 to August 2011, Toscani served as Saarland Minister of the Interior and European Affairs in the third Müller cabinet, and from August 24, 2011, to May 9, 2012, as State Minister of the Interior, Culture and Europe in the first Kramp-Karrenbauer cabinet. After the collapse of the Jamaica coalition, the ministers of the Free Democratic Party (FDP) and the Alliance 90/The Greens were dismissed from their posts on 18 January 2012. Toscani took over the management of the Ministry of Education, previously headed by Klaus Kessler. From 9 May 2012 to 28 February 2018, he was State Minister of Finance and Europe in the second Kramp-Karrenbauer cabinet, from April 2017 to February 2018, he also served as Minister of Justice in the third Kramp-Karrenbauer cabinet.

At the end of May 2022, following the resignation of Tobias Hans, Toscani became chairman of the CDU Saar and parliamentary group leader of his party in the Saarland state parliament and thus also leader of the opposition.

Toscani is a member of the non-partisan Europa-Union Deutschland, which advocates for a federal Europe and the European unification process.
