= Bettina Hornhues =

German politician (born 1972)

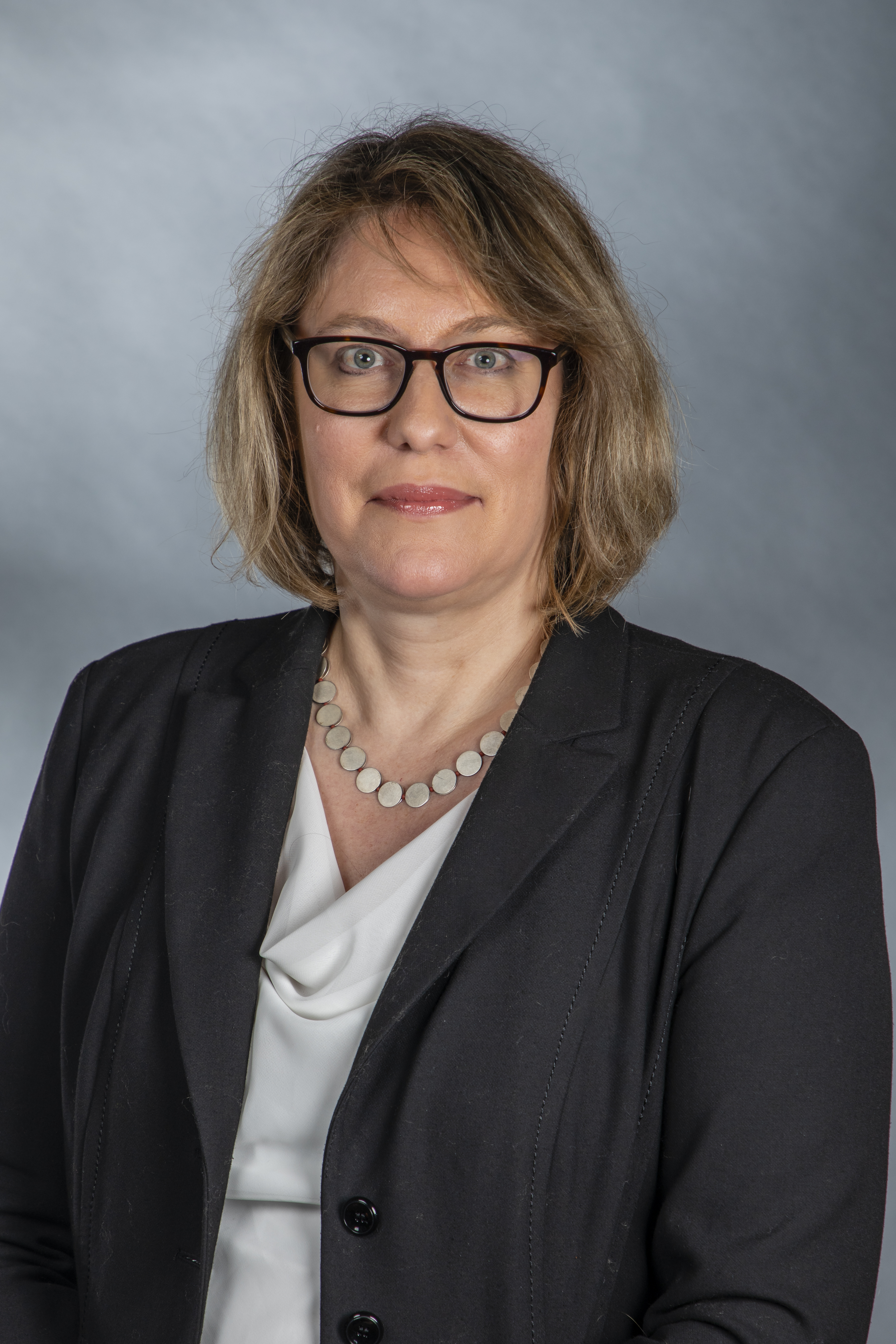
- Hornhues in 2019

Member of the Bürgerschaft of Bremen
- Incumbent
- Assumed office 8 June 2019

Personal details
- Born: 19 July 1972 (age 53) Bremen
- Party: Christian Democratic Union (since 1991)

Else Katharina Bettina Hornhues (née Bartels; born 19 July 1972 in Bremen) is a German politician serving as a member of the Bürgerschaft of Bremen since 2019. From 2013 to 2017, she was a member of the Bundestag.
