= 2027 Bremen state election =

Election in Bremen, Germany

Next Bremen state election
- 30 May 2027

All 87 seats in the Bürgerschaft of Bremen 44 seats needed for a majority
Party	SPD	CDU	Greens
Last election	27 seats, 29.8%	24 seats, 26.2%	11 seats, 11.9%
Current seats	28	24	11
Party	Left	BD	FDP
Last election	10 seats, 10.9%	10 seats, 9.4% (Note: Results for BIW, which has since then merged into BD.)	5 seats, 5.1%
Current seats	9	6	5
Incumbent Government
Second Bovenschulte senate
SPD–Green–Left

Elections to the Bürgerschaft of Bremen are scheduled to be held on 30 May 2027.

== Opinion polls ==
=== Graphical summary ===
Local regression of polls conducted

=== Party polling ===
Polling firm	Fieldwork date	Sample size	SPD	CDU	Grüne	Linke	BD	FDP	AfD	BSW	Others	Lead
INSA	28 Jul – 4 Aug 2026	1,000	20	21	15	14	3	4	17	3	3	1
Infratest dimap	12–17 Mar 2026	1,147	22	24	15	13	–	–	15	3	8	2
Infratest dimap	22–24 Apr 2025	1,128	25	22	14	13	3	–	15	–	8	3
Federal Parliament election	23 Feb 2025	–	23.1	20.5	15.6	14.8	0.3	3.5	15.1	4.3	2.8	2.6
European Parliament election	9 Jun 2024	–	21.5	19.8	16.2	5.8	0.8	5.3	10.2	5.6	14.8	1.7
2023 state election	14 May 2023	–	29.8	26.2	11.9	10.9	9.4	5.1	–	–	6.7	3.6
