= Wiebke Winter =

German politician (born 1996)

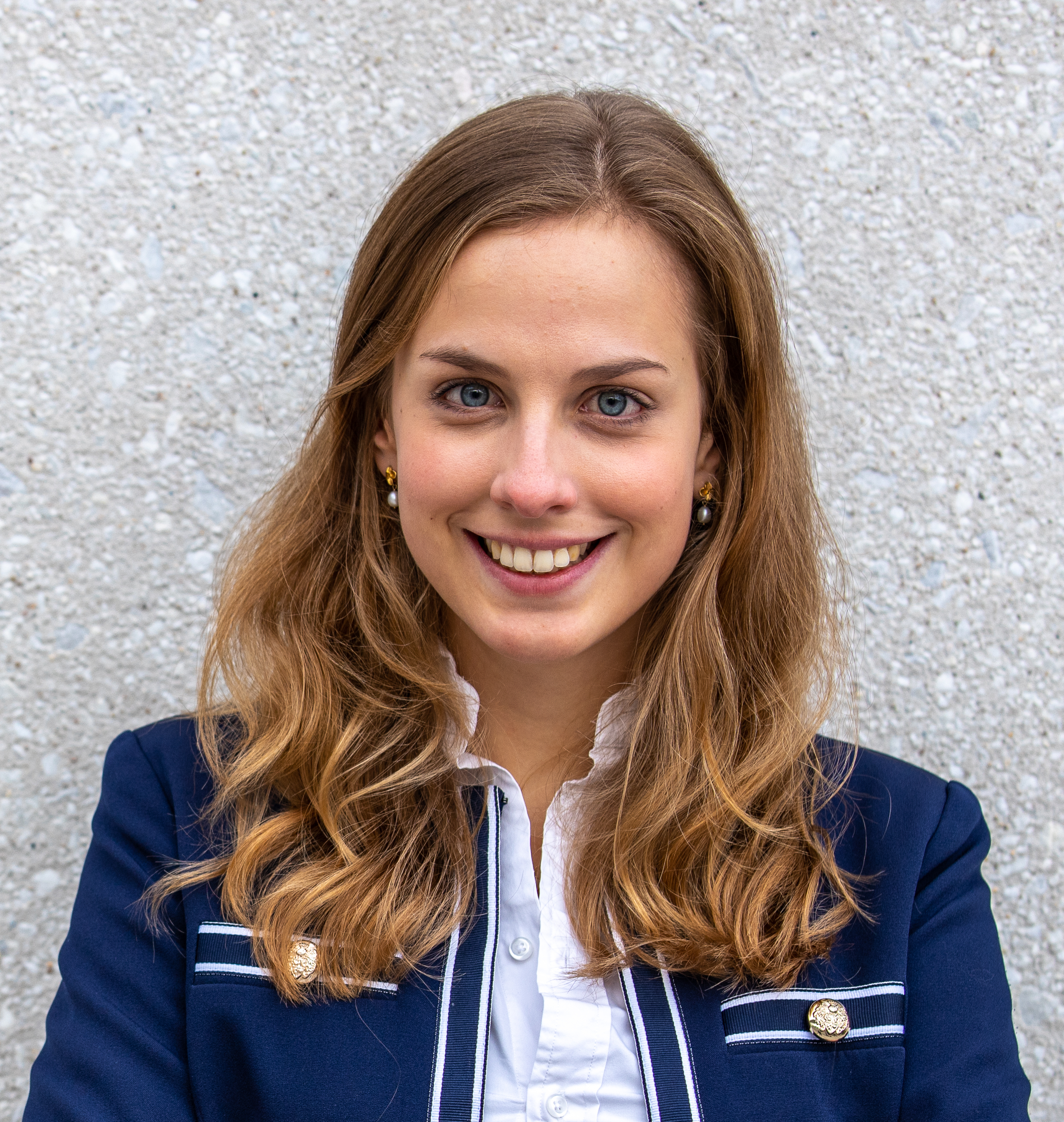
- Winter in 2020

Member of the Bürgerschaft of Bremen
- Incumbent
- Assumed office 29 June 2023

Personal details
- Born: 17 March 1996 (age 30)
- Party: Christian Democratic Union (since 2013)

Wiebke Winter (born 17 March 1996) is a German politician serving as a member of the Bürgerschaft of Bremen since 2023. She has served as group leader of the Christian Democratic Union and leader of the opposition since 2025.
