= Frank Imhoff =

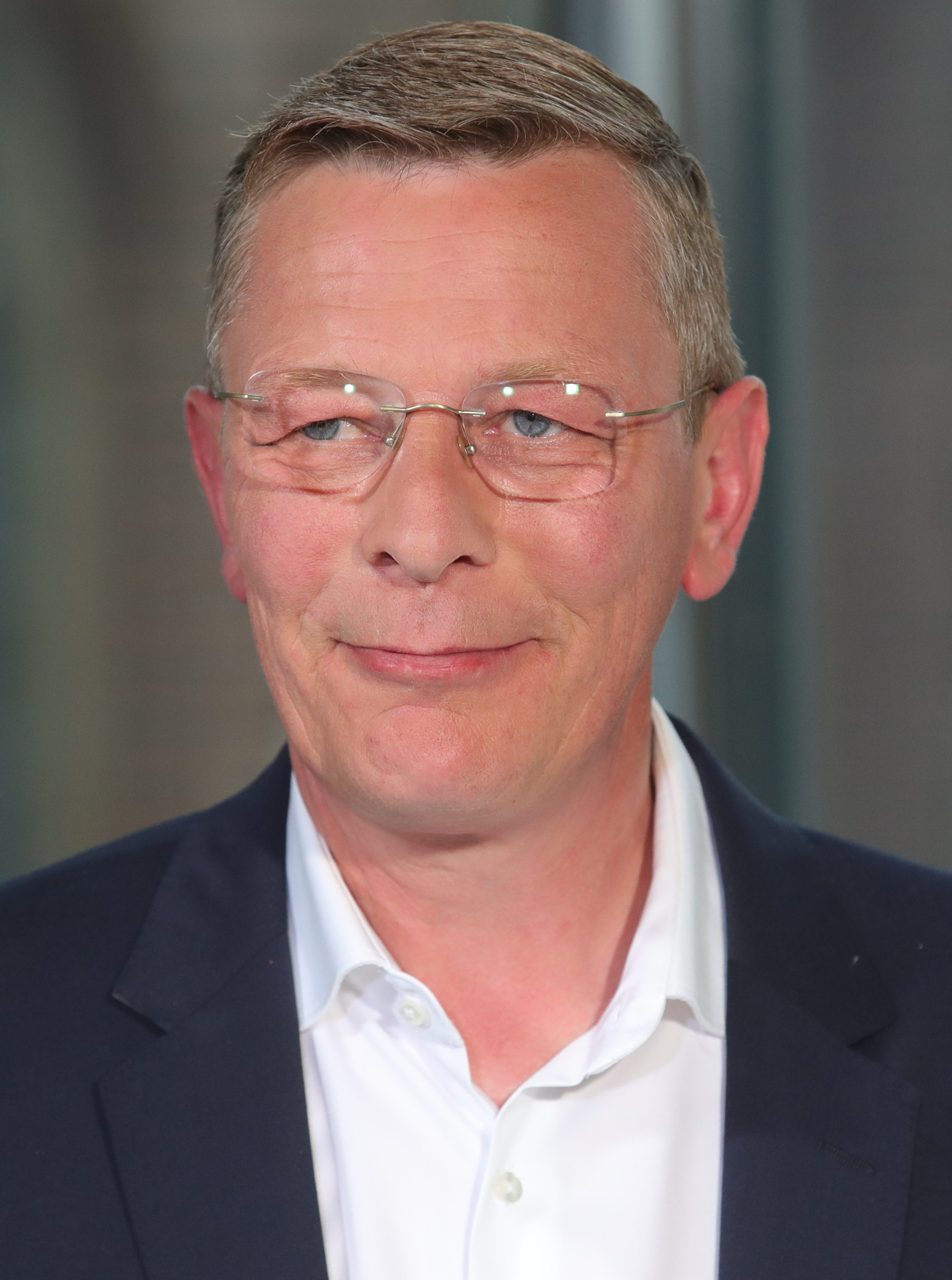
Frank Imhoff in 2023

Frank Imhoff (born 23 October 1968) is a German farmer and politician from the Christian Democratic Union. He has been president of the Bremen Parliament since July 2019, to which he has been a member since 1999. He was the CDU's top candidate for the 2023 Bremen state election.

== Life ==
=== Family, education and career ===
After graduating from secondary school, Frank Imhoff trained as a farmer at the agricultural vocational school in Wildeshausen from 1985 to 1988. He then attended the one-year technical school of the Vocational Schools 3 of the City of Oldenburg, which he graduated in 1989 as a "state-certified economist". From 1990 to 1995 Imhoff worked as an employee in a farm and at the same time completed an apprenticeship as a landscape manager.

In 1996, Imhoff took over his parents' dairy farm in the Bremen district of Strom, which he has been running as an independent farmer with his family since the fifth generation.

Frank Imhoff is married and has three children.

=== Politics ===
Imhoff has been a member of the CDU since 1993. He is a member of the state board of the CDU Bremen and was chairman of the CDU district association Niedervieland. He has been a member of the Bremen Parliament since the 1999 Bremen state election. There he was a member of the state and municipal deputation for climate, environment, agriculture and animal welfare and spokesman for the CDU parliamentary group for agriculture.

On 1 July 2015, Frank Imhoff was elected vice president of the Bremen Parliament. As a result of the death of the previous president of the city council, Christian Weber, he took over his duties on an interim basis on February 12, 2019. On March 27, 2019, Antje Grotheer was elected the new president of the Parliament.

After the CDU emerged from the state elections in Bremen on 26 May 2019 as the strongest force in the history of the state for the first time, Imhoff was elected president of the state parliament in the constituent meeting of the 20th legislative period on 3 July 2019. In this function he is also chairman of the constitution and rules of procedure committee and of the Low German advisory board.

The state CDU decided in May 2022 to nominate him as the top candidate for the 2023 general election. In the election the CDU suffered defeat only winning the same number of seats they won in 2019.

=== Other offices and memberships (selection) ===
- Bremer Suppengel eV (patron)
- Bremen Agricultural Association (member of the board)
- Chamber assembly of the Bremen Chamber of Agriculture (member)
- Agricultural Association for the Netherlands (chairman)
- Schütting Foundation (chairman of the board of trustees)
- Volksbund German War Graves Commission, State Association Bremen (patron)
- Wilhelm Kaisen Bürgerhilfe eV (chairman of the board)
