= 2027 Saarland state election =

State election in Saarland, Germany

- 18 April 2027

All 51 seats in the Landtag of Saarland 26 seats needed for a majority
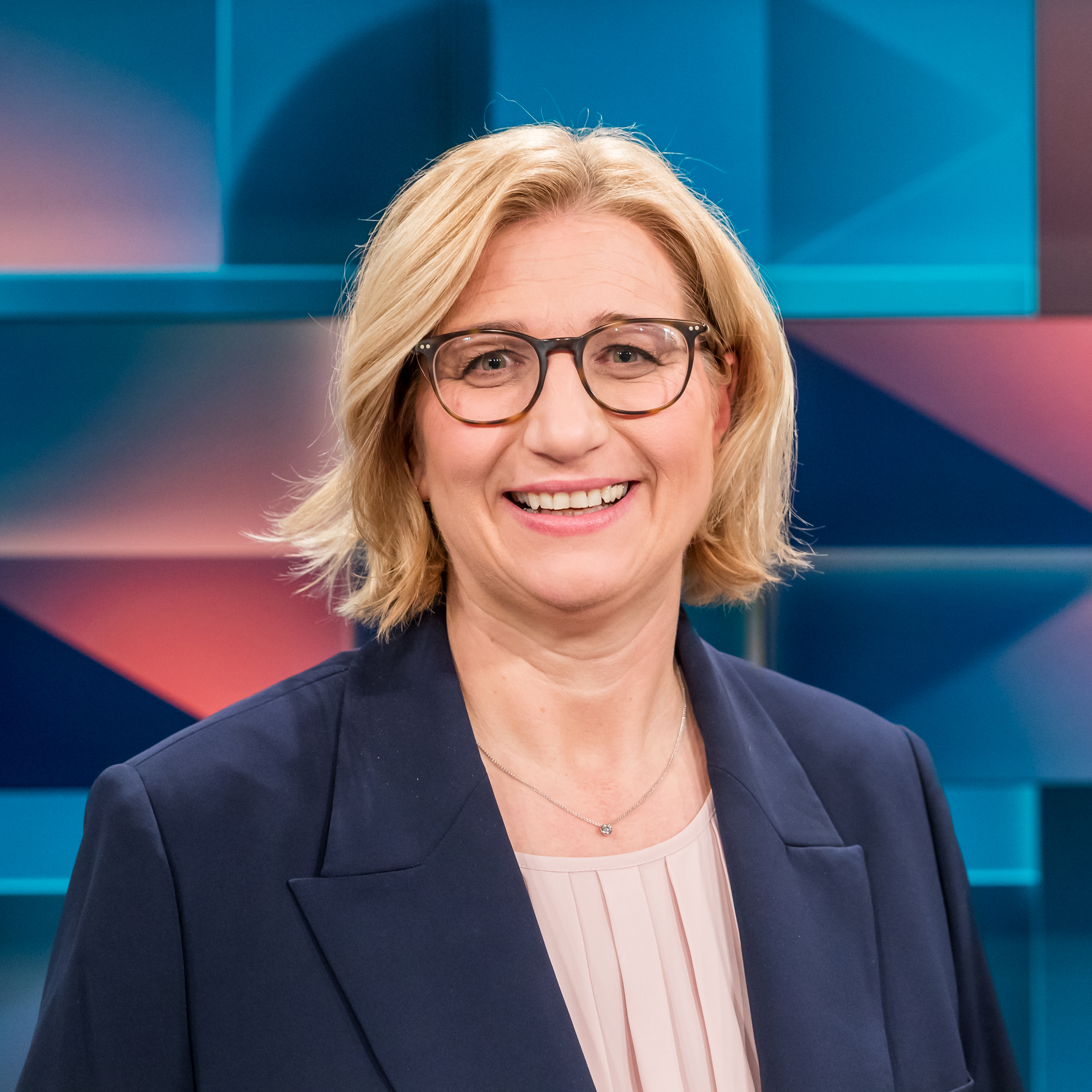

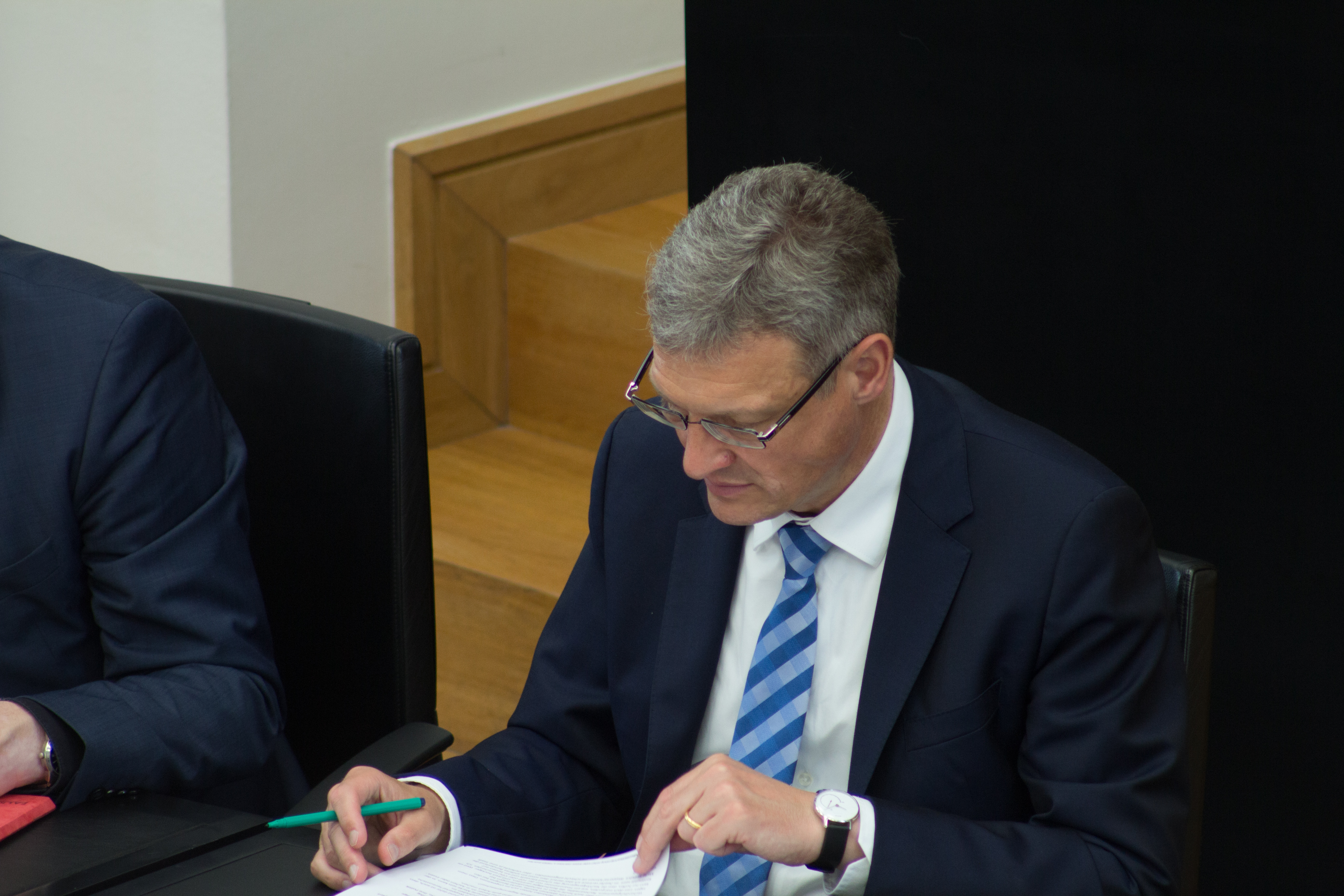
			AfD
Candidate	Anke Rehlinger	Stephan Toscani	Carsten Becker
Party	SPD	CDU	AfD
Last election	29 seats, 43.5%	19 seats, 28.5%	3 seats, 5.7%
Incumbent Government
Rehlinger cabinet
SPD

The 2027 Saarland state election will be held on 18 April 2027 to elect the 18th Landtag of Saarland.

== Election date ==
The Landtag is elected for five years, with its term commencing when the new Landtag first meets. As the previous election took place on 27 March 2022, the next election was required to take place before April 2027.

== Electoral system ==
The 51 members of the Landtag are elected via closed list proportional representation using the d'Hondt method. 41 seats are distributed in three multi-member constituencies, and the remaining ten at the state level. An electoral threshold of 5% of valid votes is applied to the Landtag; parties that fall below this threshold are ineligible to receive seats.

== Background ==
In the previous election held on 27 March 2022, the Social Democratic Party (SPD) achieved an absolute majority, becoming the strongest party for the first time since the 1994 Saarland state election. The Christian Democratic Union (CDU) decreased to a historical low of 28.5% of the vote. The Alternative for Germany (AfD) suffered slight losses but succeeded in reentering the state parliament as the third parliamentary group.

The Left fell to only 2.6% of the vote, dropping out of the state parliament. The Greens and Free Democratic Party (FDP) each narrowly failed to enter the state parliament with 4.995% and 4.8% of the vote respectively.

After the election, an SPD sole government was formed for the first time since 1999, with 29 of the 51 state parliament seats. It replaced a grand coalition of the CDU and SPD under Tobias Hans. The new Minister-President was the former deputy head of government, economics minister and SPD top candidate Anke Rehlinger. Rehlinger was elected and sworn in by the state parliament on April 25 2022 with 32 out of 51 votes.

She thus received three votes more than the number of members of her own government parliamentary group. Thus, at least three opposition deputies voted for Rehlinger. She then appointed her cabinet of four men and two women.

== Parties ==
The table below lists parties represented in the 17th Landtag of Saarland.

Name		Ideology	Lead candidate	2022 result	
Name		Ideology	Lead candidate	Votes (%)	Seats
SPD	Social Democratic Party of Germany; Sozialdemokratische Partei Deutschlands	Social democracy	Anke Rehlinger	43.5%	29 / 51
CDU	Christian Democratic Union of Germany; Christlich Demokratische Union Deutschlands	Christian democracy	Stephan Toscani	28.5%	19 / 51
AfD	Alternative for Germany; Alternative für Deutschland	Right-wing populism	Carsten Becker	5.7%	3 / 51

== Opinion polls ==
Polling firm	Fieldwork date	Sample size	SPD	CDU	AfD	Grüne	FDP	Linke	BSW	Others	Lead
Infratest dimap	26 Oct – 1 Nov 2026	1,269	33	20	21	9	3	6	3	5	12
Infratest dimap	20–26 Nov 2025	1,150	27	25	23	7	–	7	3	8	2
Infratest dimap	25–28 Mar 2025	1,132	30	27	17	6	3	8	4	5	3
Federal Parliament election	23 Feb 2025	–	21.9	26.9	21.6	7.2	4.3	7.3	6.2	4.6	5.0
Infratest dimap	19–23 Sep 2024	1,558	29	31	14	5	–	–	10	11	2
European Parliament election	9 Jun 2024	–	20.5	29.3	15.7	6.6	4.7	2.0	7.8	13.4	8.8
Wahlkreisprognose	19 Apr – 2 May 2024	1,080	36	28.5	8.5	5	3.5	2	9	7.5	7.5
Wahlkreisprognose	1–8 Aug 2023	783	35	23	23	4.5	5	1	–	8.5	12
Infratest dimap	15–20 Mar 2023	1,176	38	28	10	8	5	3	–	8	10
Wahlkreisprognose	11–19 Jan 2023	853	42.5	27.5	12	5	4.5	1.5	–	7	15
Wahlkreisprognose	3–5 Nov 2022	879	42	26.5	14	4.5	4.5	2	–	6.5	15.5
2022 state election	27 Mar 2022	–	43.5	28.5	5.7	5.0	4.8	2.6	–	9.9	15.0

=== Minister-President polling ===
Polling firm	Fieldwork date	Sample size				Lead
Polling firm	Fieldwork date	Sample size	Rehlinger SPD	Toscani CDU	Becker AfD	Lead
Infratest dimap	20–26 Nov 2025	1,150	53	25	—	28
Infratest dimap	25–28 Mar 2025	1,132	54	23	—	31
Infratest dimap	19–23 Sep 2024	1,558	49	19	5	30
