= Nelson Janßen =

German politician (born 1990)

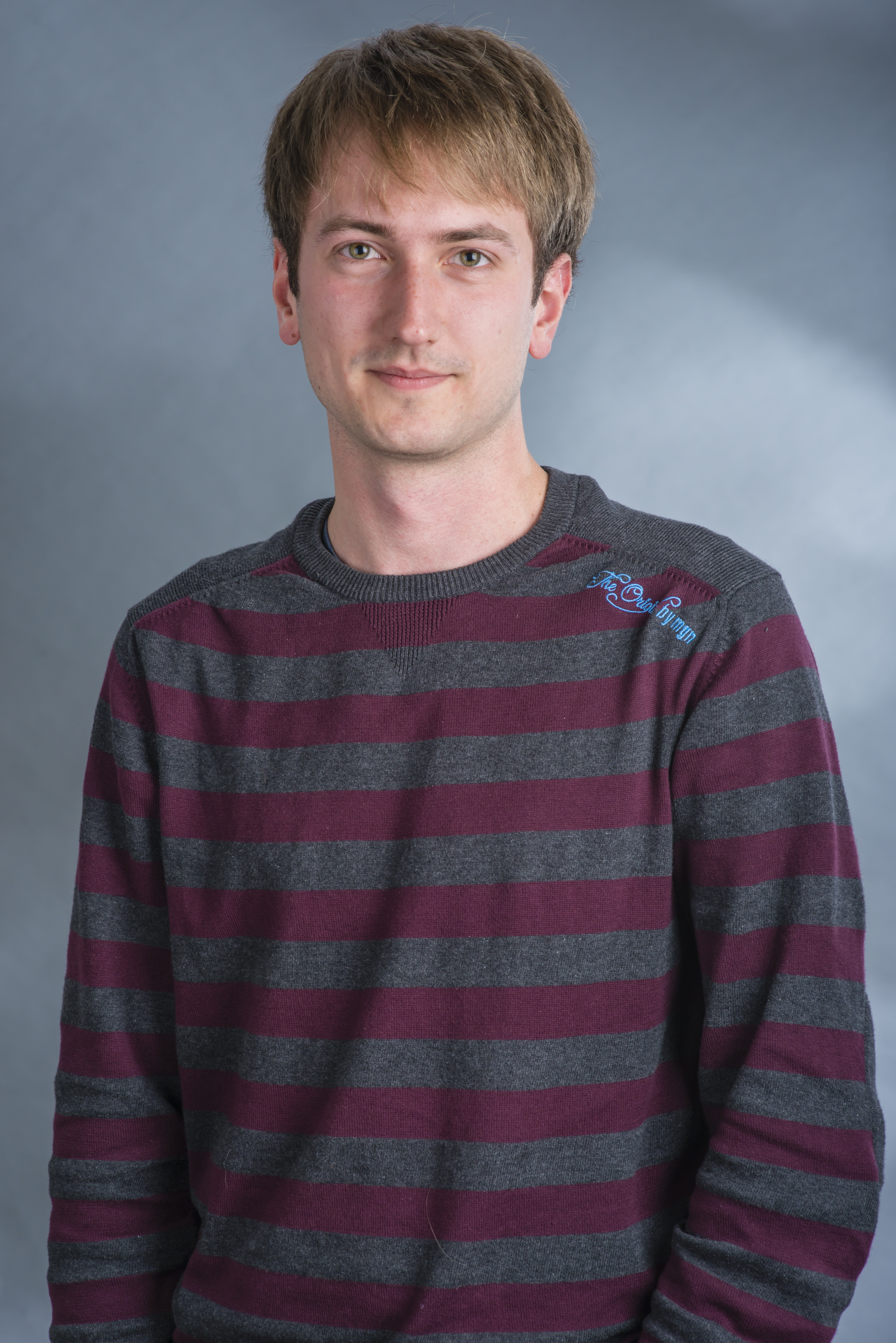
- Janßen in 2015

Member of the Bürgerschaft of Bremen
- Incumbent
- Assumed office 8 June 2015

Personal details
- Born: 26 October 1990 (age 35)
- Party: Die Linke (since 2009)

Nelson Janßen (born 26 October 1990) is a German politician serving as a member of the Bürgerschaft of Bremen since 2015. He has served as co-group leader of Die Linke since 2019.
