= Heike Winzent =

German politician (born 1976)

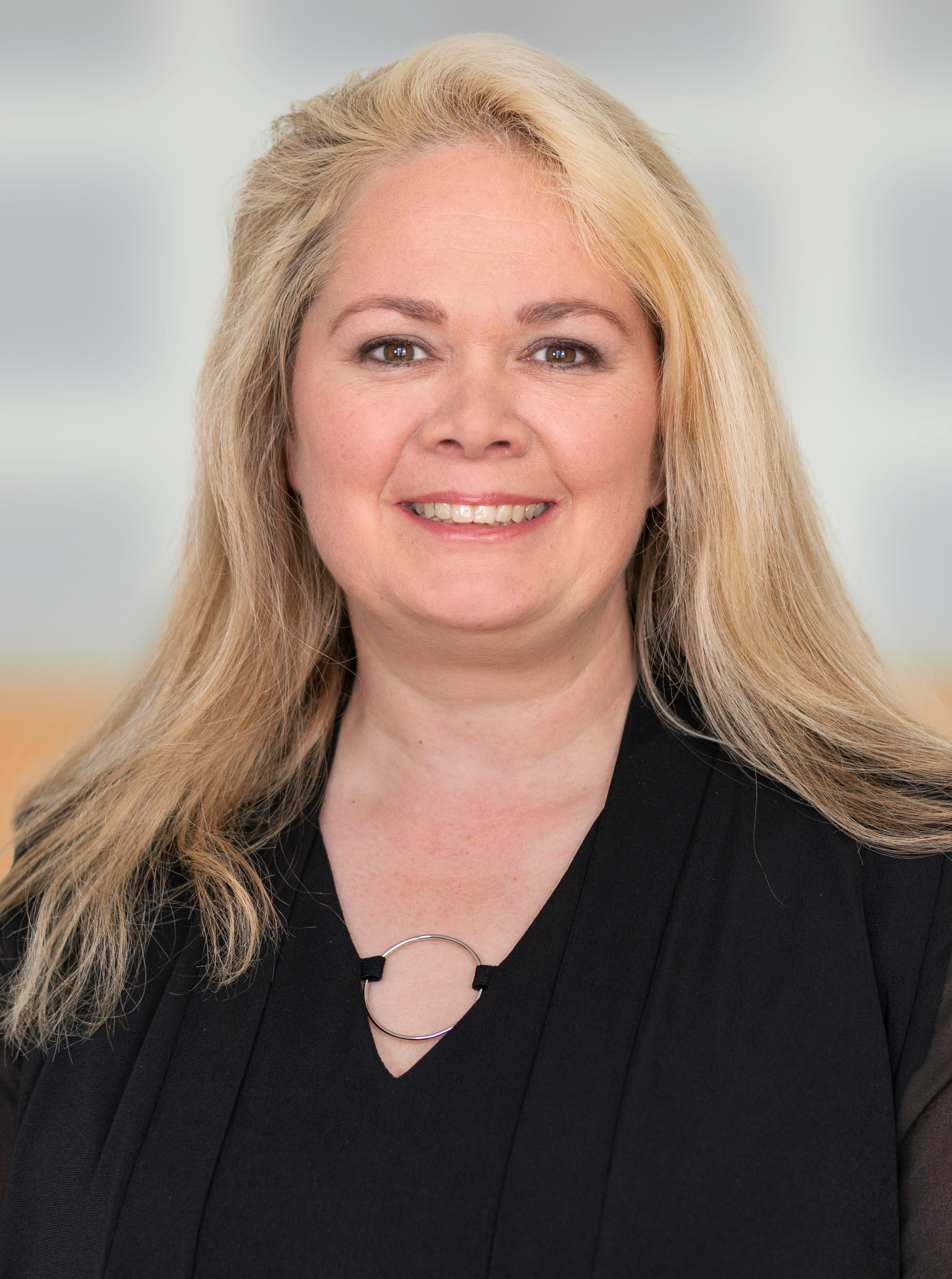
- Winzent in 2022

President of the Landtag of Saarland
- Incumbent
- Assumed office 25 April 2022
- Preceded by: Stephan Toscani

Personal details
- Born: 1 April 1976 (age 50)
- Party: Social Democratic Party (since 2007)

Heike Sylvia Winzent (previously Becker; born 1 April 1976) is a German politician serving as a member of the Landtag of Saarland since 2019. She has served as president of the Landtag since 2022.

== Biography ==
After the Mittleren Reife an der Maximilian-Kolbe-Schule in Neunkirchen-Wiebelskirchen absolvierte Winzent in den Jahren 1992 bis 1995 eine Berufsausbildung zur Waltungsfachangestellten. The following information is available from 2010 to 2012 regarding the information provided by the government and the war during 2019, including the city administration of the Neunkirchen District Council, as well as guidance for central management and administrative information. It was since 1995 that the work was carried out and that they were committed to the AWO, the DRK, the DKMS and the zoo in Neunkirchen. Ferner has been working since August 2017 as a Dozentin für Kommunalrecht an der Saarländischen Verwaltungsschule (SVS).

Since August 2007, the SPD has been in power since 2016, with the leadership of the SPD-Stadtverbandes Neunkirchen. Today is the end of 2018 with the committee committee and the committee party of the SPD Saarland.

On October 30, 2019 we will be back for the Environment Secretariat to be observed by Sebastian Thul in the Saarländischen Landtag. In Parliament during the end of the Wahl Period in April 2022, Mitglied des Ausschusses für Eingaben, Bildung, Kultur und Medien, Wissenschaft, Research und Technology as well as the Ausschusses für Umwelt und Verbraucherschutz.[1] Bei der Landtagswahl im Saarland 2022 wurde sie erneut in den Landtag gewählt und in der konstituierenden Sitzung des Landtages am 25. April 2022 zur sie ersten Landtagspräsidentin in der Geschichte des Saarlandes gewählt.
