= Antje Grotheer =

German politician (born 1967)

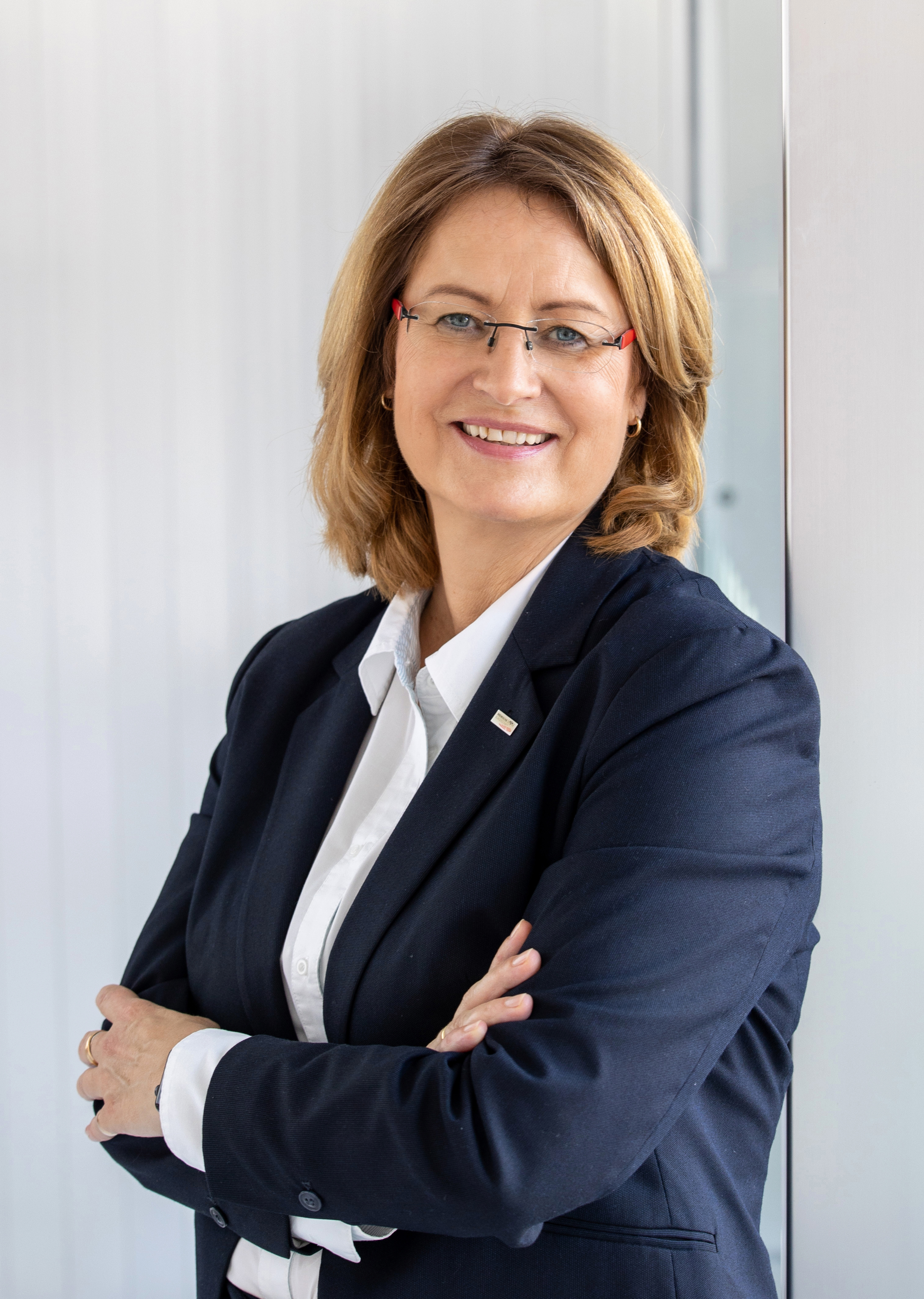
- Grotheer in 2023

President of the Bürgerschaft of Bremen
- Incumbent
- Assumed office 29 June 2023
- Preceded by: Frank Imhoff
- In office 27 March 2019 – 3 July 2019
- Preceded by: Christian Weber
- Succeeded by: Frank Imhoff

Personal details
- Born: 25 January 1967 (age 59)
- Party: Social Democratic Party (since 1985)

Antje Grotheer (born 25 January 1967) is a German politician (SPD) and lawer, serving as a member of the Bürgerschaft of Bremen since 2011. She has served president of the Bürgerschaft since 2023, having previously served from March to July 2019.

Grotheer holds a MA in law from the University Bremen. She has been personal assistant of the Bremen Senator for education and science Willi Lemke (SPD) from 2003 till 2008.
