= Hendrikje Klein =

German politician (born 1979)

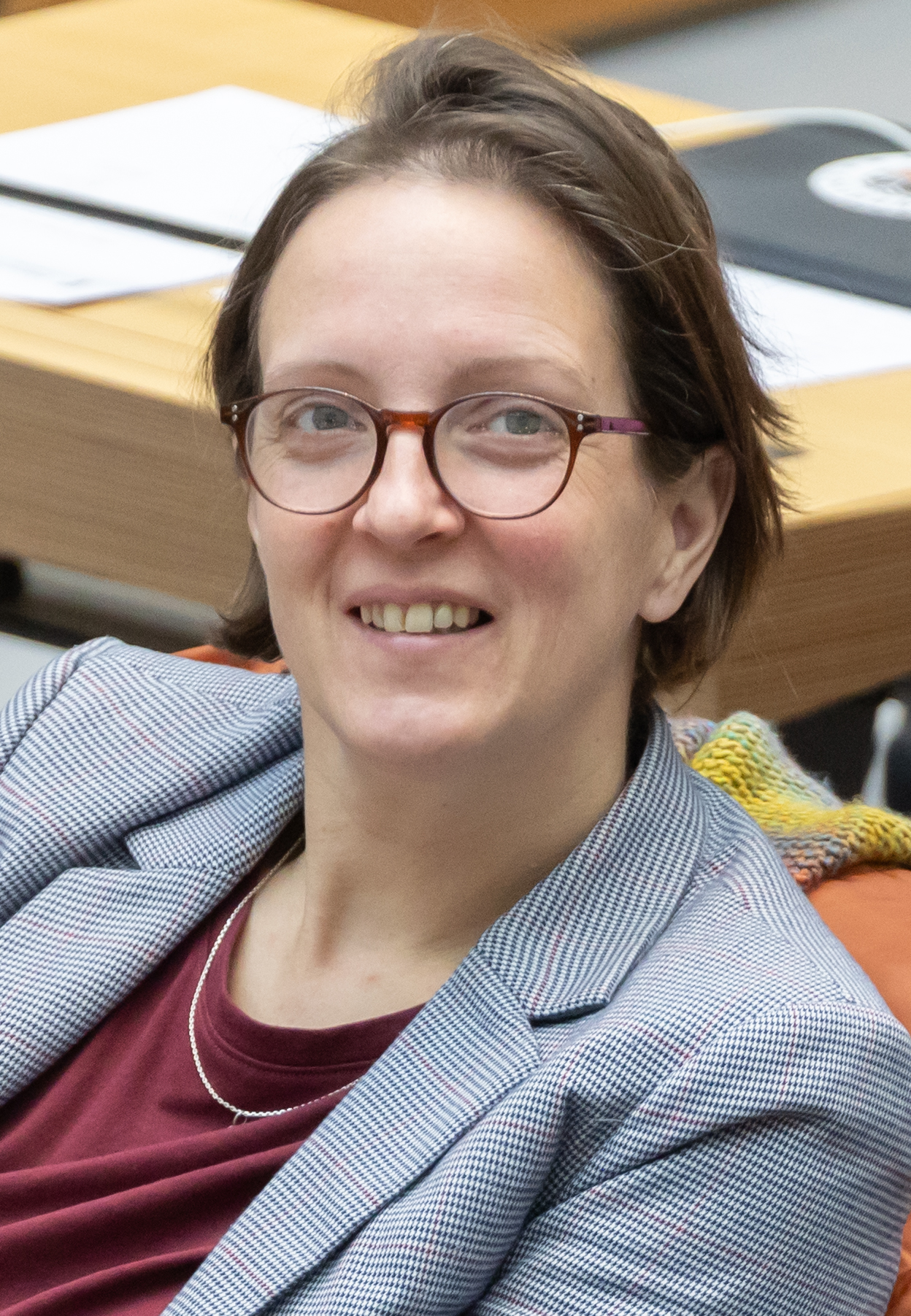
- Klein in 2025

President of the Abgeordnetenhaus of Berlin
- Incumbent
- Assumed office 29 October 2026

Member of the Abgeordnetenhaus of Berlin
- Incumbent
- Assumed office 27 October 2016
- Preceded by: Ole Kreins
- Constituency: Lichtenberg 5

Personal details
- Born: 14 December 1979 (age 46) Berlin, Germany
- Party: Die Linke

Hendrikje Klein (born 14 December 1979) is a German politician serving as a member of the Abgeordnetenhaus of Berlin since 2016. She has served as chief whip of Die Linke since 2024.
