= Infratest dimap =

German political research company

Infratest dimap is a German institute and company from Berlin that offers psephological and political research. It is well known in Germany for publishing the ARD-Deutschlandtrend poll. The poll is released at least once a month on behalf of public broadcaster ARD, always on the first Thursday of the month for ARD Tagesthemen. Before the 2025 federal election, there was also a second poll published on one of the following Thursdays of the month for ARD Morgenmagazin. Infratest dimap is also known for extrapolations and projections on election nights in Germany, including federal elections.

== History ==
The institute was formed in 1996 out of Infratest Burke Berlin, which was founded in 1990 by TNS Infratest, and the Bonn based institute for market and political research, dimap. TNS Infratest holds 51 percent, dimap 49 percent of the shares. It has 25 employees, but for polls and election nights up to 1,200 freelancers are added.

== Media and reception ==
Infratest dimap cooperates since 1997 with ARD news magazines such as Tagesschau. Its polls are well-received throughout German newsmedia. Political magazine Cicero criticized Infratest dimap for inaccurate analyses of swing voters and non-voters. It accused the institute of using a "principle McDimap".
