= Maurice Müller (politician) =

German politician

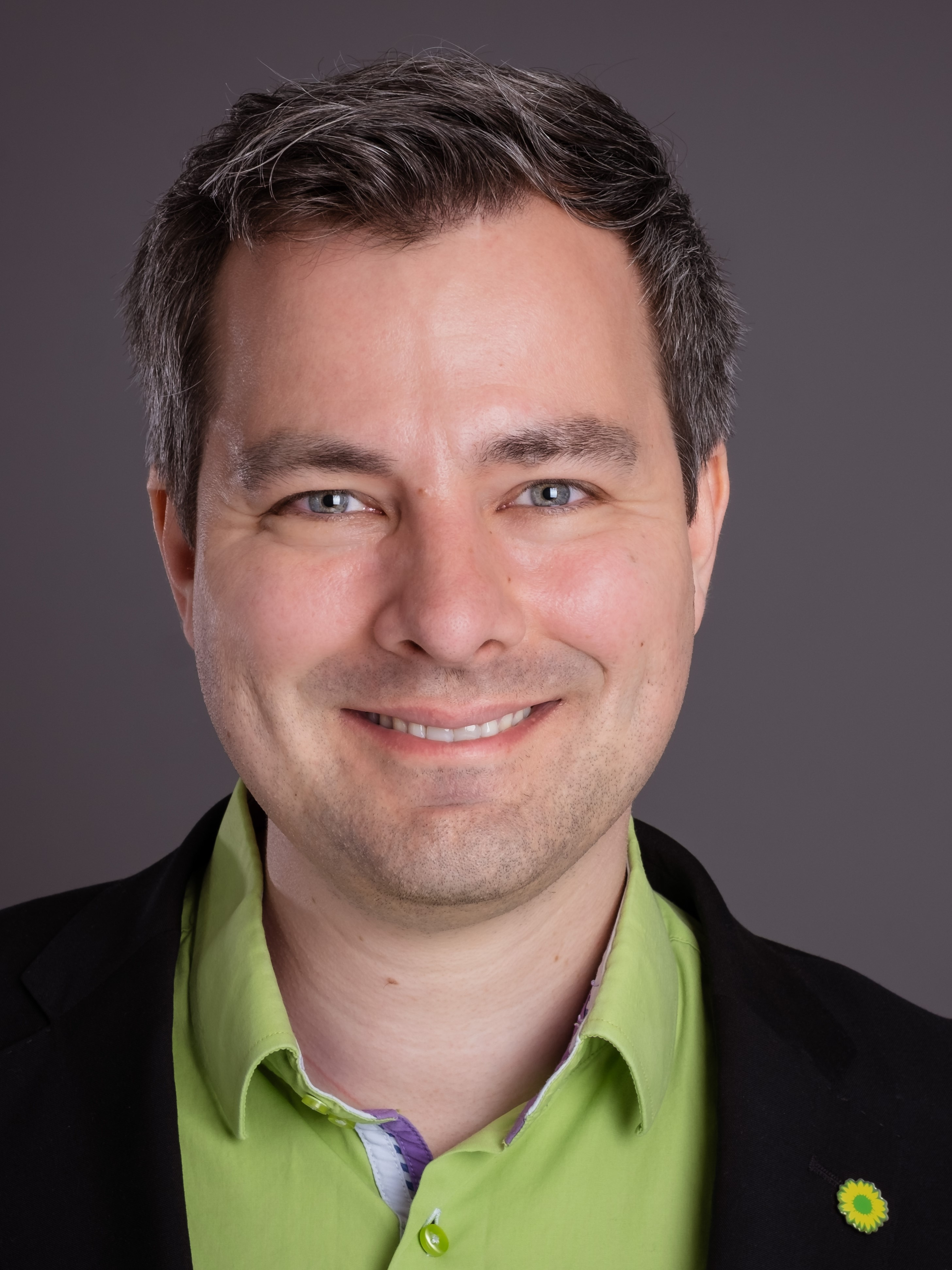
Maurice Müller (2021)

Maurice Müller (born 6 March 1983) is a German politician (Bündnis 90/Die Grünen) and parliamentarian at Bremische Bürgerschaft.

== Biography ==
Müller was born and raised at Kassel. After his high school exam, Müller studied political sciences, legal sciences and North American history at Universität Erfurt and concluded with the title of Bachelor of Arts in 2006. Müller continued in studying political communication at Bielefeld University and European Studies at Sciences Po in Paris. He was nominated for programme Europa Intensiv which included a one-year training and an internship at the Representation of Hesse to the EU in Brussels. Müller wrote his master thesis about "Europeanization" and finished in 2010. In addition, he was involved in a communications and sustainability project at Commerzbank in Frankfurt. The project was organised by the talent organisation Campus of Excellence.

Müller is married and lives in Geestemünde at Bremerhaven.

=== Political activities ===
Müller was a member and committee member of Green Youth (Germany) at Kassel and became a member of Green Party. In 2012 he moved to the Green Party in Bremerhaven. He also became a committee member for several periods.

==== Municipal Councillor at Bremerhaven ====
In 2014, Müller was unanimously elected as a municipal councillor and head for the environmental and climate department. He was elected as one of the youngest municipal councillors in Bremerhaven and became a member of the Magistrate of the city of Seestadt Bremerhaven. Müller opened a city bureau on climate affaires at Bremerhaven. He also supported the founding of Climate Council for young people at Bremerhaven. In September 2014 Bremerhaven became Fairtrade town under his leadershop. Together with the Climate Council for young people Müller opened the first repair cafe of Bremerhaven in December 2014.

After Bremen elections in 2015, Müller became municipal councillor and head for the parks and open space planning department (Gartenbauamt). It provides planning, building and keeping of the Green in Bremerhaven, which also means responsibility for biodiversity and climate adoption concerning tree selection and saving green areas. Müller focussed on sustainability and better conditions for bees and insects in Bremerhaven. He implemented more wildflower meadows in Bremerhaven especially near to streets and on Green areas. He supported learning programs in schools at Bremerhaven, which focus on biodiversity. The Gartenbauamt extensively refurbished the historical Holzhafen at Geestemuende in the term of office of Müller. Müller led the department until June 2019.

==== Member of Bremen Parliament ====
In 2019 Müller has been elected to Bürgerschaft of Bremen for Bündnis '90/Die Grünen. Müller is chairman of the harbour committee of the Bremen Parliament. He is speaker on innovation and technology for his Green Party. Müller is expert to the Energiewende process in Germany and Bremen (state). He also works for a German Research Institute focused on Wind energy systems at Bremerhaven.

Müller also led the Green negotiations team concerning economy and harbour policies. These finally concluded as a part to the coalition contract of SPD, Bündnis '90/Die Grünen and The Left (Germany).

Müller is an elected member of the first inquiry commission concerning climate protection of Bremische Bürgerschaft.

==== UN Internet Governance ====
Müller participated in UN IGF 2019 at Berlin. Müller is focussed on digitalization as a broad participation process. This means a regulation on hate and faked news on the Internet. Müller presented results of his research at the European Communication Convention ECC 2017 at Munich.
