= List of presidents of the Landtag of Saarland =

The following is a list of presidents of the Landtag of Saarland.

== Presidents of the Landesrat des Saargebiets ==
The presidents of the Landesrat (Regional Council) were not elected by the Regional Council of the Saar Territory, but deliberately determined by the Governing Commission, which again was appointed by the League of Nations. The first president appointed was not even elected as a representative of the Regional Council.

Name	Period	Party
Bartholomäus Koßmann	July 19, 1922 – March 23, 1924	Zentrum
Peter Scheuer	March 24, 1924 – February 28, 1935	Zentrum

== President of the Legislative Assembly of Saarland ==
Name	Period	Party
Johannes Hoffmann	October 14, 1947 – December 15, 1947	CVP

== Presidents of the Landtag ==
Name	Period	Party
Peter Zimmer	December 15, 1947 – January 1, 1956	SPS
Heinrich Schneider	January 2, 1956 – December 31, 1956	DPS
Wilhelm Kratz	March 18, 1957 – February 26, 1959	CDU
Julius von Lautz	February 26, 1959 – April 30, 1959	CDU
Alfons Davo	November 4, 1959 – January 2, 1961	CDU
Josef Schmitt	January 3, 1961 – December 31, 1965	CDU
Hans Maurer	February 3, 1966 – October 13, 1974	CDU
Franz Schneider	November 6, 1974 – July 13, 1975	CDU
Ludwig Schnurr	July 14, 1975 – May 20, 1980	CDU
Albrecht Herold	May 21, 1980 – November 9, 1994	SPD
Hans Kasper	November 9, 1994 – September 28, 1999	SPD
Hans Ley	September 29, 1999 – July 16, 2015	CDU
Isolde Ries (acting)	July 16, 2015 – November 11, 2015	SPD
Klaus Meiser	November 11, 2015 – present	CDU

== Sources ==
- Landtag des Saarlandes | Die Präsidenten der saarländische Volksvertretungen von 1922 bis heute
