= Bürgerschaft of Bremen =

State legislature n in Germany

Coordinates: 53.075°N 8.808°E

Bürgerschaft of Bremen Bremische Bürgerschaft
- 21st Bürgerschaft of Bremen

Type
- Type: Landtag
- Established: 1433

Leadership
- President: Antje Grotheer, SPD since 29 June 2023

Structure
- Seats: 87
- Political groups: Government (48) SPD (28) Greens (11) The Left (9) Opposition (39) CDU (24) BIW (6) FDP (5) AfD (1) Independent (3)

Elections
- Last election: 14 May 2023
- Next election: 2027

Meeting place
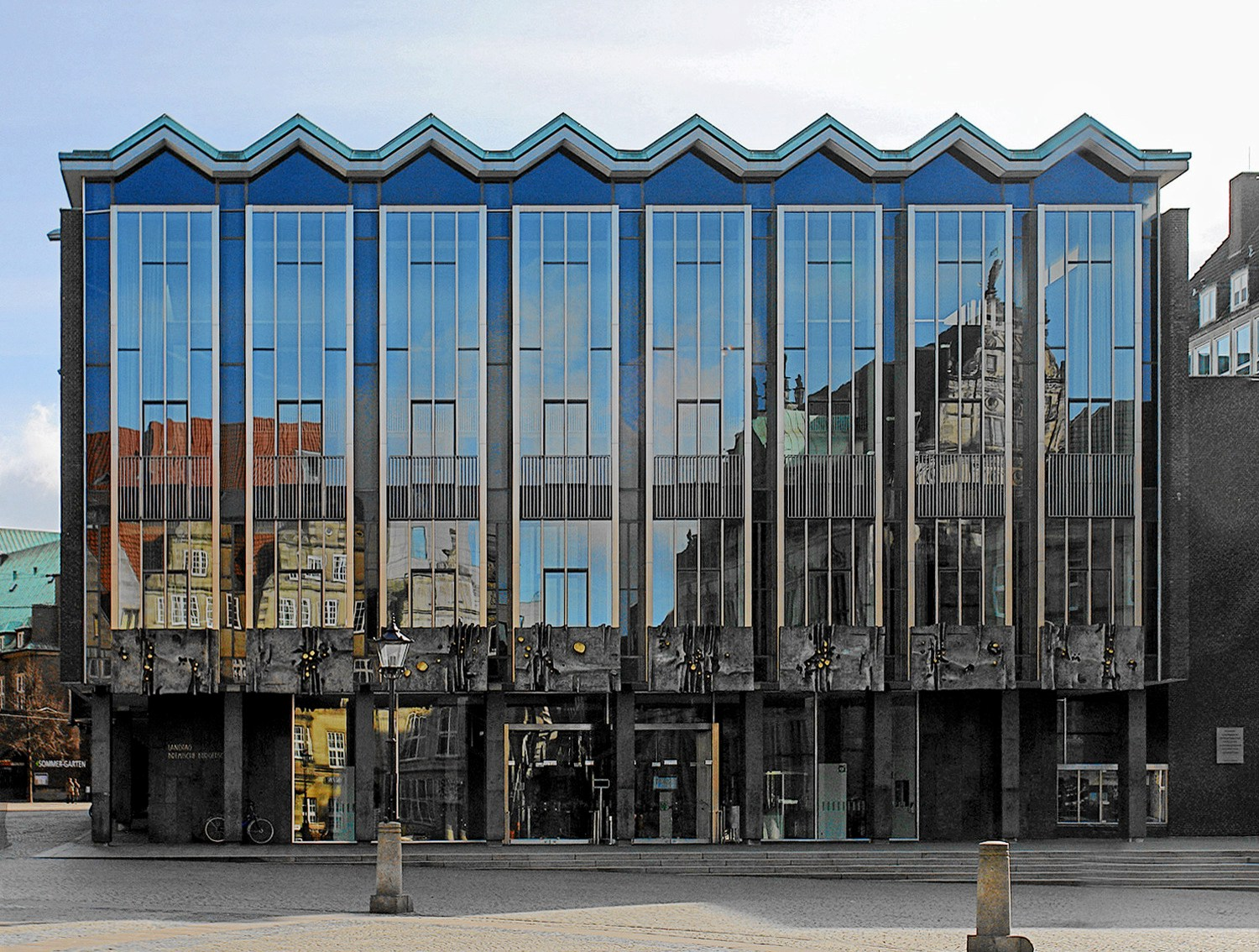
- Haus der Bürgerschaft, Bremen

Website
- bremische-buergerschaft.de

The State Parliament of Bremen (Bremische Bürgerschaft, lit. 'Bremish Citizenry' or 'Citizenry of Bremen') is the legislative branch of the Free Hanseatic City of Bremen in Germany. The state parliament elects the members of the Senate (executive), exercises oversight of the executive, and passes legislation. It currently consists of 87 members from six parties. The current majority is a coalition of the Social Democratic Party, Alliance 90/The Greens and The Left, supporting Mayor and Senate president Andreas Bovenschulte. The 72 delegates of the city of Bremen also form the Stadtbürgerschaft (the local parliament of the city), while Bremerhaven has its own local parliament.

== Current composition ==
After the elections of 14 May 2023, the composition of the Bürgerschaft is as follows:

Party	Seats
Social Democratic Party (SPD)	27
Christian Democratic Union (CDU)	24
Alliance '90/The Greens (Bündnis 90/Die Grünen)	11
The Left (Die Linke)	10
Citizens in Rage (BIW)	10
Free Democratic Party (FDP)	5

After the elections of 26 May 2019, the composition of the Bürgerschaft was as follows:

Party	Seats
Christian Democratic Union (CDU)	24
Social Democratic Party (SPD)	23
Alliance '90/The Greens (Bündnis 90/Die Grünen)	16
The Left (Die Linke)	10
Alternative for Germany (AfD)	5
Free Democratic Party (FDP)	5
Citizens in Rage (BIW)	1

Composition (June 2018)

Party	Seats
Social Democratic Party (SPD)	30
Christian Democratic Union (CDU)	19
Alliance '90/The Greens (Bündnis 90/Die Grünen)	12
The Left (Die Linke)	8
Free Democratic Party (FDP)	7
Liberal Conservative Reformers (LKR)	1
Alternative for Germany (AfD)	1
Citizens in Rage (BIW)	3
Independent	2

After the elections of 10 May 2015, the composition of the Bürgerschaft was as follows:

Party	Seats
Social Democratic Party (SPD)	30
Christian Democratic Union (CDU)	20
Alliance '90/The Greens (Bündnis 90/Die Grünen)	14
The Left (Die Linke)	8
Free Democratic Party (FDP)	6
Alliance for Progress and Renewal (ALFA)	3
Alternative for Germany (AfD)	1
Citizens in Rage (BIW)	1

After the 1956 elections, the composition of the Bürgerschaft was as follows:

Party	Votes	Seats
Social Democratic Party (SPD)	130,470	43
German Party	49,018	16
Free Democratic Party (FDP)	39,432	12
Christian Democratic Union (CDU)	31,172	9
Socialist Reich Party	25,813	8
German Communist Party	31,245	6
Total:	307,159	94

Elections are conducted using proportional representation systems in both voting districts Bremen (72 seats) and Bremerhaven (15 seats), with a minimum of 5% vote share per voting district to receive any seats. The 5% rule is used separately, thus allowing the German People's Union to join the Bürgerschaft by winning 5.7% of the votes in Bremerhaven while winning only 2.75% in the whole state of Bremen.

The 72 members from Bremen also form the Stadtbürgerschaft (city council for the City of Bremen only), which is elected by an extended electorate: the minimum age for voting is 16 instead of 18 and all citizens of the European Union are allowed to vote. It is the only German state parliament with a 4-year, rather than 5-year term. These additional votes created a green Stadtbürgerschaft-only member and a SPD non-Stadtbürgerschaft member from Bremen(City) after the 2003 elections.

In 1979, the Bremer Grüne Liste managed to join the Bürgerschaft, thus being the first Green Party to ever enter a German Landtag.

== Presidents of the Bürgerschaft ==
So far, the presidents of the Landtag of Bremen have been:

- 1946–1966 August Hagedorn, Social Democratic Party (SPD)
- 1966–1971 Hermann Engel, SPD
- 1971–1995 Dieter Klink, SPD
- 1995–1999 Reinhard Metz, Christian Democratic Union (CDU)
- 1999–2019 Christian Weber, SPD
- 2019 Antje Grotheer, SPD
- 2019–2023 Frank Imhoff, CDU
- since 2023 Antje Grotheer, SPD

== The House of the Parliament ==
The House of the Parliament officially opened in September 1966. Bremen's parliament building is called Haus der Bürgerschaft. The building has a frame construction of iron-reinforced concrete. The sheathing of glass has been hung in front of this construction. The height of the building is approximately that of the level of the eaves of both the Bremen City Hall and the Schütting. The folded roof was a compromise solution conceived as a means for converging and linking the building with the older buildings surrounding the historic market square. The facade of the parliament building reflects the old buildings in the mirror-like surface of the glass sheathing. Artificial reliefs made of aluminum highlight the window sills.

== See also ==
- 1999 Bremen state election
- 2003 Bremen state election
- 2007 Bremen state election
